= The Allman Brothers Band discography =

- Studio albums: 12
- Live albums: 7
- Compilation albums: 18
- Singles: 22
- Video albums: 4
- Retrospective live albums: 19

The Allman Brothers Band was an American rock band formed in Jacksonville, Florida, in 1969 by brothers Duane Allman (slide guitar and lead guitar) and Gregg Allman (vocals, keyboards, songwriting), as well as Dickey Betts (lead guitar, vocals, songwriting), Berry Oakley (bass guitar), Butch Trucks (drums), and Jai Johanny "Jaimoe" Johanson (drums). The band incorporated elements of Southern rock, blues, jazz, and country music, and their live shows featured jam band-style improvisation and instrumentals.

The group's first two studio releases stalled commercially, but their 1971 live release, At Fillmore East, represented an artistic and commercial breakthrough. The album features extended renderings of their songs "In Memory of Elizabeth Reed" and "Whipping Post", and is often considered the best live album ever made. Group leader Duane Allman was killed in a motorcycle accident later that year, and the band dedicated Eat a Peach (1972) in his memory, a dual studio/live album that cemented the band's popularity. Following the motorcycle death of bassist Berry Oakley later that year, the group recruited keyboardist Chuck Leavell and bassist Lamar Williams for 1973's Brothers and Sisters, which, combined with the hit single "Ramblin' Man", placed the group at the forefront of 1970s rock music. Internal turmoil overtook them soon after; the group dissolved in 1976, reformed briefly at the end of the decade with additional personnel changes, and dissolved again in 1982.

The band re-formed once more in 1989, releasing a string of new albums and touring heavily. A series of personnel changes in the late 1990s was capped by the departure of Betts. The group found stability during the 2000s with bassist Oteil Burbridge and guitarists Warren Haynes (in his second stint with the band) and Derek Trucks (the nephew of their drummer) and became renowned for their month-long string of shows at New York City's Beacon Theatre each spring. The band retired for good in 2014. The band has been awarded seven gold and four platinum albums, and was inducted into the Rock and Roll Hall of Fame in 1995. Rolling Stone ranked them 52nd on their list of the 100 Greatest Artists of All Time in 2004.

== Studio and contemporary live albums ==
More so than most bands, the Allman Brothers have frequently released live albums that filled the role of conventional studio albums, in that they were recently recorded and often contained new material not on any studio album, or significantly lengthened or revamped versions of studio material. An integral part of the contemporaneous evolution of the band, such live albums are included in this section.

| Title | Album details | Peak chart positions | | | | | | | | Certifications |
| Title | Album details | US | CA | AUS | GER | NO | NL | NZ | UK | Certifications |
|---|---|---|---|---|---|---|---|---|---|---|
| The Allman Brothers Band | Released: November 1969; Label: Atco; Format: LP | 188 | — | — | — | — | — | — | — | |
| Idlewild South | Released: September 1970; Label: Atco; Format: LP | 38 | — | — | — | — | — | — | — | |
| At Fillmore East (live) | Released: July 6, 1971; Label: Capricorn; Format: LP | 13 | 44 | — | — | — | — | — | — | RIAA: Platinum; BPI: Silver |
| Eat a Peach (part live) | Released: February 1972; Label: Capricorn; Format: LP | 4 | 12 | 35 | — | — | — | — | — | RIAA: Platinum |
| Brothers and Sisters | Released: August 1973; Label: Capricorn; Format: LP | 1 | 1 | 5 | 52 | — | 10 | — | 42 | RIAA: Platinum |
| Win, Lose or Draw | Released: August 1975; Label: Capricorn; Format: LP | 5 | 79 | — | — | — | — | 14 | — | RIAA: Gold |
| Wipe the Windows, Check the Oil, Dollar Gas (live) | Released: November 1976; Label: Capricorn; Format: LP | 75 | 71 | — | — | — | — | — | — | |
| Enlightened Rogues | Released: February 1979; Label: Capricorn; Format: LP | 9 | 15 | — | — | — | — | — | — | RIAA: Gold |
| Reach for the Sky | Released: August 1980; Label: Arista; Format: LP | 27 | 74 | 92 | — | — | — | — | — | |
| Brothers of the Road | Released: August 1981; Label: Arista; Format: LP | 44 | — | — | — | — | — | — | — | |
| Seven Turns | Released: July 3, 1990; Label: Epic; Format: CD | 53 | 42 | — | — | 19 | — | — | — | |
| Shades of Two Worlds | Released: July 2, 1991; Label: Epic; Format: CD | 85 | 78 | — | — | — | — | — | — | |
| An Evening with the Allman Brothers Band: First Set (live) | Released: June 9, 1992; Label: Epic; Format: CD | 80 | — | — | — | — | — | — | — | |
| Where It All Begins | Released: May 3, 1994; Label: Epic; Format: CD | 45 | — | — | — | — | — | — | — | RIAA: Gold |
| An Evening with the Allman Brothers Band: 2nd Set (live) | Released: May 9, 1995; Label: Epic; Format: CD | 88 | — | — | — | — | — | — | — | |
| Peakin' at the Beacon (live) | Released: November 4, 2000; Label: Epic; Format: CD | — | — | — | — | — | — | — | — | |
| Hittin' the Note | Released: March 18, 2003; Label: Sanctuary; Format: CD | 37 | — | — | 55 | — | — | — | — | |
| One Way Out (live) | Released: March 23, 2004; Label: Sanctuary; Format: CD | 190 | — | — | — | — | — | — | — | |
"—" denotes releases that did not chart.

== Retrospective live albums ==
Retrospective live albums are concert recordings "from the vault" that were released on CD or LP years after the actual performances. Many of these albums feature the original lineup of the Allman Brothers Band, including Duane Allman on lead and slide guitar and Berry Oakley on bass.

| Title | Release date | Notes |
|---|---|---|
| Live at Ludlow Garage: 1970 | April 20, 1990 | Recorded April 11, 1970 at Ludlow Garage in Cincinnati; Two CDs |
| Fillmore East, February 1970 | 1996 | Recorded February 11–14, 1970 at the Fillmore East in New York City; Remastered and re-released in 2018 as Bear's Sonic Journals: Fillmore East, February 1970. |
| American University 12/13/70 | April 2002 | Recorded December 13, 1970 at American University in Washington, D.C. |
| S.U.N.Y. at Stonybrook: Stonybrook, NY 9/19/71 | March 2003 | Recorded September 19, 1971 at the State University of New York at Stony Brook in Stony Brook, New York; Two CDs |
| Live at the Atlanta International Pop Festival: July 3 & 5, 1970 | October 21, 2003 | Recorded July 3 and 5, 1970 at the Atlanta International Pop Festival in Byron, Georgia; Two CDs |
| Macon City Auditorium: 2/11/72 | 2004 | Recorded February 11, 1972 at the Macon City Auditorium in Macon, Georgia; Two CDs |
| Nassau Coliseum, Uniondale, NY: 5/1/73 | 2005 | Recorded May 1, 1973 at Nassau Coliseum in Uniondale, New York; Two CDs |
| Boston Common, 8/17/71 | 2007 | Recorded August 17, 1971 at Boston Common in Boston |
| Play All Night: Live at the Beacon Theatre 1992 | February 18, 2014 | Recorded March 10–11, 1992 at the Beacon Theatre in New York City; Two CDs |
| Live from A&R Studios | April 1, 2016 | Recorded August 26, 1971, at A&R Studios in New York City |
| The Fox Box | March 24, 2017 | Recorded September 24–26, 2004 at the Fox Theatre in Atlanta; Eight CDs; Remastered version of the 9-CD album of the same name that was released in 2004 |
| Cream of the Crop 2003 | June 15, 2018 | Recorded July 25 – August 10, 2003 at various venues; Four CDs |
| Fillmore West '71 | September 6, 2019 | Recorded January 29–31, 1971 at the Fillmore West in San Francisco; Four CDs |
| The Final Note | October 16, 2020 | Recorded October 17, 1971 at the Painters Mill Music Fair in Owings Mills, Maryland; Songs from the last concert with Duane Allman, captured on a hand-held cassette recorder |
| Warner Theatre, Erie, PA 7-19-05 | October 16, 2020 | Recorded July 19, 2005 at the Warner Theatre in Erie, Pennsylvania; Two CDs |
| Down in Texas '71 | March 26, 2021 | Recorded September 28, 1971 at the Austin Municipal Auditorium in Austin, Texas |
| Syria Mosque | October 28, 2022 | Recorded January 17, 1971 at the Syria Mosque in Pittsburgh |
| Manley Field House, Syracuse University, April 7, 1972 | January 12, 2024 | Recorded April 7, 1972 at Manley Field House in Syracuse, New York |
| Final Concert 10-28-14 | October 25, 2024 | Recorded October 28, 2014 at the Beacon Theatre in New York City |

== Compilation albums ==
| Title | Album Details | Peak chart positions | | | | Certification |
| Title | Album Details | US | CA | GE | UK | Certification |
|---|---|---|---|---|---|---|
| Beginnings | Released: 1973; Re-release of The Allman Brothers Band and Idlewild South | 25 | 38 | — | — | RIAA: Gold |
| The Road Goes On Forever | Released: 1975; Compilation of 17 songs (LP), expanded to 30 songs (CD) in 2001 | 43 | — | — | 54 | |
| The Best of the Allman Brothers Band | Released: 1981; Compilation of songs from their first eight albums | — | — | — | — | RIAA: Gold |
| Dreams | Released: June 1989; Compilation of songs from the Allman Brothers Band and from group members' solo albums | 103 | — | — | — | RIAA: Gold |
| A Decade of Hits 1969–1979 | Released: October 22, 1991; Compilation of songs from their first eight albums | 39 | — | — | — | RIAA: 2× Platinum |
| Ramblin' Man | Released: May 15, 1992; Compilation of songs from their first six albums | — | — | — | — | |
| Hell & High Water: The Best of the Arista Years | Released: 1994; Compilation of songs from Reach for the Sky and Brothers of the Road | — | — | — | — | |
| Legendary Hits | Released: April 16, 1995; Compilation of songs from their first six albums | — | — | — | — | |
| The Best of the Allman Brothers Band Live | Released: 1996; Compilation of songs from At Fillmore East, Wipe the Windows, Check the Oil, Dollar Gas and the Gregg Allman solo album The Gregg Allman Tour; Also released under the titles All Live!, and Jessica | — | — | — | — | |
| Mycology: An Anthology | Released: June 9, 1998; Compilation of songs from their 1990–1995 albums | — | — | — | — | |
| Madness of the West | Released: 1998; Compilation of songs from Reach for the Sky and Brothers of the Road | — | — | — | — | |
| 20th Century Masters – The Millennium Collection: The Best of the Allman Brothers Band | Released: January 25, 2000; Compilation of songs from their first eight albums | 89 | — | — | — | RIAA: Gold |
| Still Rockin' | Released: September 26, 2000; Compilation of songs from Reach for the Sky and Brothers of the Road | — | — | — | — | |
| Martin Scorsese Presents the Blues: The Allman Brothers Band | Released: September 9, 2003; Compilation of blues-rock songs covered by the Allmans | — | — | — | — | |
| Stand Back: The Anthology | Released: June 8, 2004; 2-CD compilation of songs from their 1969–2003 albums on various labels | — | — | — | — | |
| The Essential Allman Brothers Band: The Epic Years | Released: August 31, 2004; Compilation of songs from their 1990–1995 albums | — | — | — | — | |
| Gold | Released: October 11, 2005; Compiles the same tracks as the expanded reissue of The Road Goes On Forever | — | — | — | — | |
| 20th Century Masters – The Millennium Collection: The Best of the Allman Brothers Band — Live | Released: July 29, 2007; Compilation of songs from At Fillmore East, Eat A Peach, and Dreams | — | — | — | — | |
| Playlist Plus | Released: April 29, 2008; 3-CD compilation of songs from their first eight albums | — | — | — | — | |
| Green Series: The Best of the Allman Brothers Band | Released: April 29, 2008; Compilation of songs from their first eight albums | — | — | — | — | |
| Trouble No More: 50th Anniversary Collection | Released: February 28, 2020; Career retrospective compilation on 5 CDs or 10 LPs | — | — | 51 | — | |

== Concert videos ==
| Title | Album Details | Peak Chart Position | Certification |
| Title | Album Details | US | Certification |
|---|---|---|---|
| Brothers of the Road | Released: 1982; Recorded: October 26, 1980 and December 16, 1981 University of Florida Bandshell, Gainesville, Florida Capitol Theatre, Port Chester, New York | — | |
| Live at Great Woods | Released: 1992; Recorded: September 6, 1991 Great Woods Amphitheater, Mansfield, Massachusetts | — | RIAA: Gold |
| Live at the Beacon Theatre | Released: September 23, 2003; Recorded: March 25–26, 2003 Beacon Theatre, New York, New York | 14 | RIAA: Platinum |
| 40 | Released April 29, 2014; Recorded: March 26, 2009 Beacon Theatre, New York, New York | — | |

== Singles ==
| Year | Title | Peak chart positions | | | Record label | B-side | Album |
| Year | Title | US | US Main. | CAN | Record label | B-side | Album |
|---|---|---|---|---|---|---|---|
| 1969 | "Black Hearted Woman" | — | — | — | Capricorn Records | "Every Hungry Woman" | The Allman Brothers Band |
| 1970 | "Revival (Love Is Everywhere)" | 92 | — | — | Capricorn Records | "Leave My Blues at Home" | Idlewild South |
| 1970 | "Midnight Rider" | — | — | — | Capricorn Records | "Whipping Post" | Idlewild South |
| 1972 | "Ain't Wastin' Time No More" | 77 | — | — | Capricorn Records | "Melissa" | Eat a Peach |
| 1972 | "Melissa" | 86 | — | — | Capricorn Records | "Blue Sky" | Eat a Peach |
| 1972 | "One Way Out" | 86 | — | — | Capricorn Records | "Standback" | Eat a Peach |
| 1973 | "Ramblin' Man" | 2 | — | 7 | Capricorn Records | "Pony Boy" | Brothers and Sisters |
| 1973 | "Jessica" | 65 | — | 35 | Capricorn Records | "Come and Go Blues" | Brothers and Sisters |
| 1975 | "Nevertheless" | 67 | — | — | Capricorn Records | "Louisiana Lou and Three Card Monty John" (A-side) | Win, Lose or Draw |
| 1975 | "Louisiana Lou and Three Card Monty John" | 78 | — | — | Capricorn Records | "Nevertheless" | Win, Lose or Draw |
| 1979 | "Crazy Love" | 29 | — | 61 | Capricorn Records | "Just Ain't Easy" | Enlightened Rogues |
| 1979 | "Can't Take It with You" | 105 | — | — | Capricorn Records | "Sail Away" | Enlightened Rogues |
| 1980 | "Angeline" | 58 | — | — | Arista Records | "So Long" | Reach for the Sky |
| 1980 | "Mystery Woman" | — | — | — | Arista Records | "Hell and High Water" | Reach for the Sky |
| 1981 | "Straight from the Heart" | 39 | 11 | — | Arista Records | "Leavin'" | Brothers of the Road |
| 1981 | "Two Rights" | — | — | — | Arista Records | "Never Knew How Much (I Needed You)" | Brothers of the Road |
| 1990 | "Good Clean Fun" | — | 1 | 69 | Epic Records | "Seven Turns" | Seven Turns |
| 1990 | "Seven Turns" | — | 12 | — | Epic Records | "Good Clean Fun" (A-Side) | Seven Turns |
| 1990 | "It Ain't Over Yet" | — | 26 | — | Epic Records | - | Seven Turns |
| 1991 | "End of the Line" | — | 2 | 74 | Epic Records | - | Shades of Two Worlds |
| 1994 | "No One to Run With" | — | 7 | 32 | Sony Music | - | Where It All Begins |
| 1994 | "Back Where It All Begins" | — | 29 | 92 | Sony Music | - | Where It All Begins |
| 2003 | "Firing Line" | — | 37 | ? | Sanctuary Records | - | Hittin' the Note |
"—" denotes releases that did not chart. "?" indicates no info at this time

== Music videos ==
| Year | Video |
|---|---|
| 1990 | "Good Clean Fun" |
| 1990 | "Seven Turns" |

== "Instant Live" releases ==
"Instant Live" releases are albums offered at the end of various Allman concerts, recording the majority of the concert, and making an album from the sound board recording. An example is Rosemont Theatre, Chicago, 9/01/04.

== Other appearances ==
| Album | Songs | Year |
|---|---|---|
| Mar y Sol: The First International Puerto Rico Pop Festival | "Ain't Wastin' Time No More" | 1972 |
| The Best of King Biscuit Live Volume 3 | "Ramblin' Man" | 1991 |
| Live @ the World Cafe 18: I'll Take You There | "Midnight Rider" | 2004 |
| Endless Highway: The Music of The Band | "The Night They Drove Old Dixie Down" | 2007 |
| All My Friends: Celebrating the Songs & Voice of Gregg Allman | "Dreams", "Whipping Post" | 2014 |

== Live albums by recording date ==
- Fillmore East, February 1970 – February 11, 13-14, 1970
- Live at Ludlow Garage: 1970 – April 11, 1970
- Live at the Atlanta International Pop Festival: July 3 & 5, 1970 – July 3 & 5, 1970
- American University 12/13/70 – December 13, 1970
- Syria Mosque – January 17, 1971
- Fillmore West '71 – January 29-31, 1971
- At Fillmore East – March 12-13, 1971
- Eat a Peach – March 13, June 27, 1971
- Boston Common, 8/17/71 – August 17, 1971
- Live from A&R Studios – August 26, 1971
- S.U.N.Y. at Stonybrook: Stonybrook, NY 9/19/71 – September 19, 1971
- Down in Texas '71 – September 28, 1971
- The Final Note – October 17, 1971
- Macon City Auditorium: 2/11/72 – February 11, 1972
- Manley Field House, Syracuse University, April 7, 1972 – April 7, 1972
- Wipe the Windows, Check the Oil, Dollar Gas – December 31, 1972; July 28, 1973; September 26, 1973; October 22 & 24, 1975
- Nassau Coliseum, Uniondale, NY: 5/1/73 – May 1, 1973
- An Evening with the Allman Brothers Band: First Set – December 28-31, 1991; March 3-4, 1992; March 10-11, 1992
- Play All Night: Live at the Beacon Theatre 1992 – March 10-11, 1992
- An Evening with the Allman Brothers Band: 2nd Set – June 11, 1992; July 1, 1994; August 16, 1994
- Peakin' at the Beacon – March 9-25, 2000
- One Way Out – March 25-26, 2003
- Cream of the Crop 2003 – July 25-26, August 2-3, 9-10, 2003
- The Fox Box – September 24-26, 2004
- Warner Theatre, Erie, PA 7-19-05 – July 19, 2005
- Final Concert 10-28-14 – October 28, 2014
