= List of the Allman Brothers Band members =

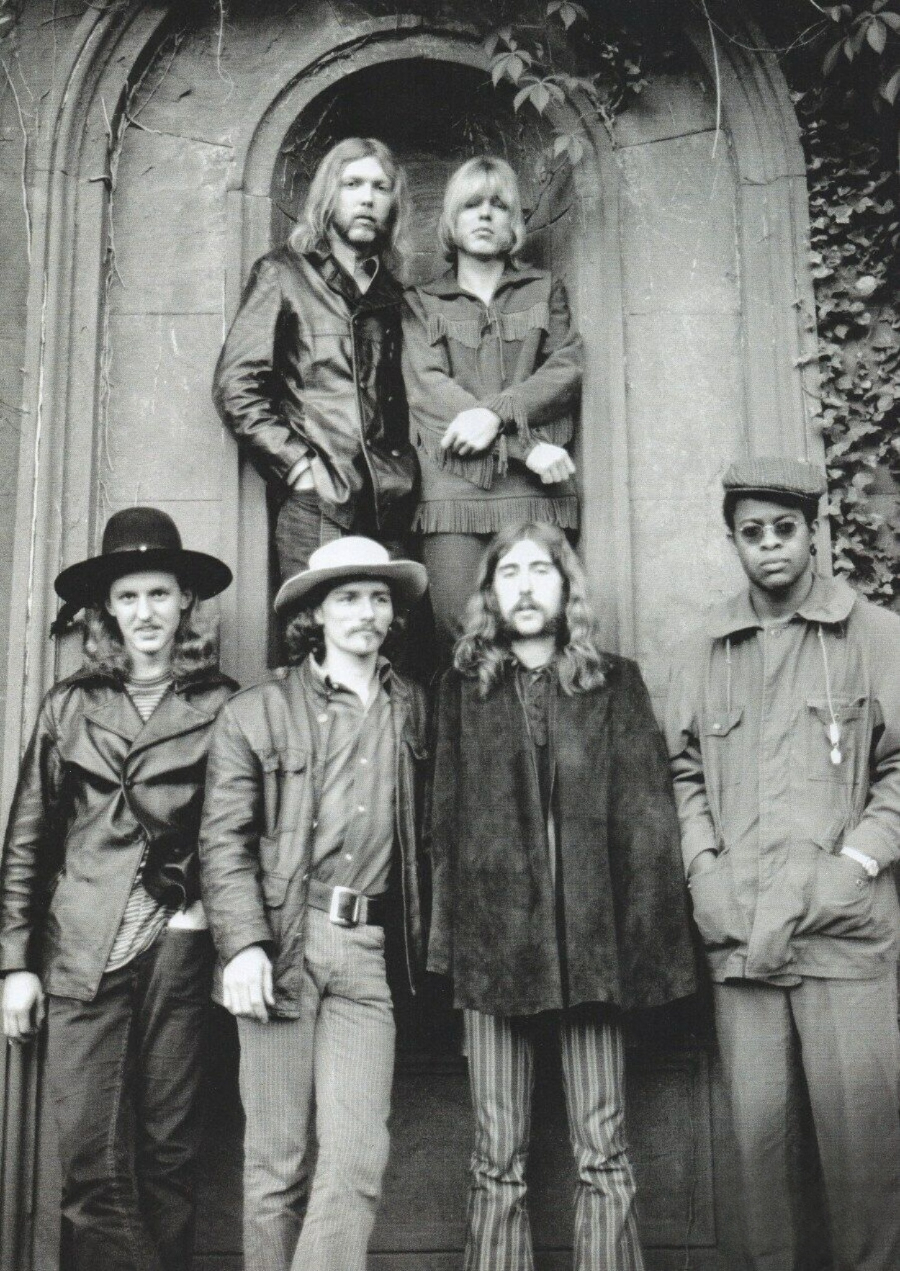
left to right, (back) Duane Allman and Gregg Allman (front) Butch Trucks, Dickey Betts, Berry Oakley and Jaimoe.

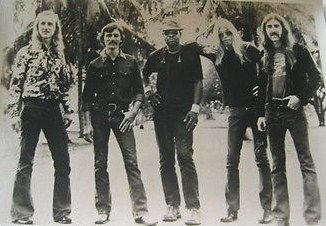
left to right: Butch Trucks, Dickey Betts, Jaimoe, Gregg Allman, Berry Oakley

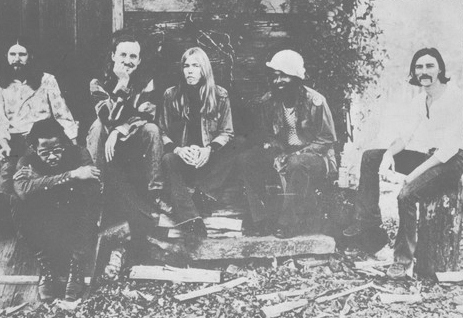
Chuck Leavell, Lamar Williams, Butch Trucks, Gregg Allman, Jaimoe, Dickey Betts

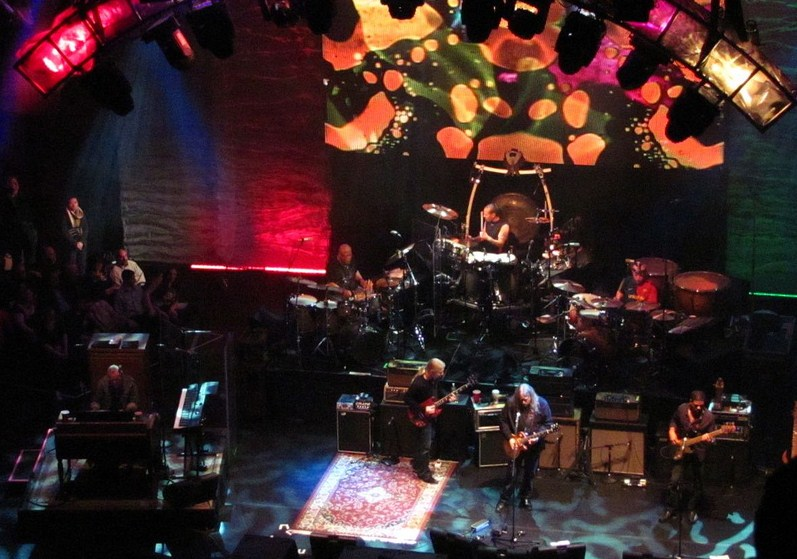
Gregg Allman, Jaimoe, Derek Trucks, Marc Quiñones (top), Warren Haynes, Butch Trucks and Oteil Burbridge

Four lineups of the Allman Brothers Band in 1969, 1972, 1975 and 2009

The Allman Brothers Band was an American rock band from Macon, Georgia. Formed in March 1969 by brothers Duane (guitar) and Gregg Allman (organ, vocals), the group originally also included guitarist and vocalist Dickey Betts, bassist Berry Oakley, and drummers Butch Trucks and Jai Johanny "Jaimoe" Johanson. The band went through multiple personnel changes and broke up twice before retiring in 2014, when the lineup included founding members Gregg Allman, Trucks and Johanson, plus guitarist and vocalist Warren Haynes, percussionist Marc Quiñones, bassist Oteil Burbridge and guitarist Derek Trucks.

== History ==
=== 1969–1976 ===
The Allman Brothers Band was founded in March 1969 by Duane and Gregg Allman with Dickey Betts, Berry Oakley, Butch Trucks and Jai Johanny "Jaimoe" Johanson. Just two years after forming, however, Duane Allman died in a motorcycle crash in Macon on October 29, 1971. The guitarist was not replaced, although Chuck Leavell was added as a second keyboardist in 1972 after the band performed as a five-piece. On November 11, 1972, the group lost a second member when Oakley died in a motorcycle accident similar to Allman's. He was replaced by Lamar Williams, a childhood friend of Johanson's. In May 1976, the group disbanded after Allman testified in the trial of road manager John "Scooter" Herring, who was accused of drug dealing, with the rest of the band publicly condemning his decision to do so.

=== 1978–1982 ===
Two years later, in August 1978, the solo bands of Betts and Allman combined for a performance in New York City, sparking rumors of an Allman Brothers Band re-formation. By the end of the year the band had returned, with Allman, Betts, Trucks and Johanson joined by new guitarist "Dangerous" Dan Toler and bassist David "Rook" Goldflies. After the release of Enlightened Rogues and Reach for the Sky, Mike Lawler was added on keyboards and Johanson was replaced by Toler's brother David. The pair performed on 1981's Brothers of the Road, before the group broke up again in January 1982. Betts and Allman later toured together with their respective solo bands during 1986.

During their 1982-1989 hiatus the band reunited twice. Their first reunion took place on July 12, 1986, when they were invited by the Charlie Daniels Band to play at their annual Volunteer Jam, which took place that year at Starwood Amphitheater in Nashville, TN. Daniels himself introduced the band, before Gregg Allman, Dickey Betts, Butch Trucks, and Jaimoe took the stage, flanked by Dan Toler and Chuck Leavell, as well as Bruce Waibel and Jerry McCoy. The reunited Allman Brothers Band then turned in an electric sixty-minute set that marked their first performance as a band in over four years. The night turned into a veritable greatest hits show, opening with their classic cover of “Statesboro Blues” before performing gorgeous versions of “Blue Sky” and “One Way Out”. They took on the exploratory “In Memory Of Elizabeth Reed”, before the dream set continued with “Ramblin’ Man” and “Jessica”. The night concluded with a raucous take on the band’s traditional show-closer, “Whipping Post”. Later that year, The Allman Brothers played a second show as part of the Crackdown on Crack concert that took place at New York's Madison Square Garden on October 31. The lineup included Allman, Betts, Trucks, Jaimoe, Leavell, Dan Toler and bassist Marty Privette.

=== 1988–2014 ===
A second re-formation followed in the summer of 1989 to mark the band's 20th anniversary, with the lineup including the return of Johanson and the addition of guitarist and vocalist Warren Haynes, bassist Allen Woody and keyboardist Johnny Neel. Neel left in 1990, and percussionist Marc Quiñones was added the following year. Both Haynes and Woody left The Allman Brothers Band in April 1997 to devote their attention to Gov't Mule. Their places were taken by Jack Pearson and Oteil Burbridge, respectively, although the former was replaced by Derek Trucks in 1999. Founding member Betts was fired in May 2000 due to alleged ongoing problems with drug abuse, which he claimed were "totally, absolutely, unfounded". He was briefly replaced by Jimmy Herring, and later by the returning Haynes.

In January 2014, Haynes and Trucks announced that they planned to leave The Allman Brothers Band by the end of the year in order to focus on other projects. The group subsequently intended to retire after a string of shows at New York Beacon Theatre in March, but due to Allman suffering bronchitis the dates were postponed. The rescheduled shows were subsequently completed in October. The band's final performance on October 28, 2014, marked the 43rd anniversary of Duane Allman's death, with Trucks playing a number of his guitars to mark the occasion. Since the band's retirement, its two constant members have both died – first, Butch Trucks committed suicide by gunshot on January 24, 2017, and Gregg Allman later died on May 27, 2017, due to complications from liver cancer.

== Members ==
Image	Name	Years active	Instruments	Albums (excluding retrospective releases)
	Gregg Allman	1969–1976; 1978–1982; 1989–2014 (both died 2017)	organ; piano; clavinet; rhythm guitar; lead and backing vocals	all Allman Brothers Band releases
	Butch Trucks	1969–1976; 1978–1982; 1989–2014 (both died 2017)	drums; percussion; timpani; congas	all Allman Brothers Band releases
	Dickey Betts	1969–1976; 1978–1982; 1989–2000 (died 2024)	lead and slide guitars; backing and lead vocals	all except Hittin' the Note (2003) and One Way Out (2004)
	Jai Johanny "Jaimoe" Johanson	1969–1976; 1978–1980; 1989–2014	drums; percussion; congas; timbales	all except Brothers of the Road (1981)
	Berry Oakley	1969–1972 (until his death)	bass; backing and occasional lead vocals	The Allman Brothers Band (1969); Idlewild South (1970); At Fillmore East (1971); Eat a Peach (1972); Brothers and Sisters (1973)
	Duane Allman	1969–1971 (until his death)	lead and slide guitars	The Allman Brothers Band (1969); Idlewild South (1970); At Fillmore East (1971); Eat a Peach (1972)
	Chuck Leavell	1972–1976	piano; synthesizers; clavinet; backing vocals	Brothers and Sisters (1973); Win, Lose or Draw (1975); Wipe the Windows, Check the Oil, Dollar Gas (1976)
	Lamar Williams	1972–1976 (died 1983)	bass	Brothers and Sisters (1973); Win, Lose or Draw (1975); Wipe the Windows, Check the Oil, Dollar Gas (1976)
	David "Rook" Goldflies	1978–1982	bass	Enlightened Rogues (1979); Reach for the Sky (1980); Brothers of the Road (1981)
	Dan Toler	1978–1982 (died 2013)	lead and rhythm guitars	Enlightened Rogues (1979); Reach for the Sky (1980); Brothers of the Road (1981)
	Mike Lawler	1980–1982	piano; clavinet; synthesizers	Brothers of the Road (1981)
	David "Frankie" Toler	1980–1982 (died 2011)	drums	Brothers of the Road (1981)
	Warren Haynes	1989–1997; 2001–2014	lead and slide guitars; backing and lead vocals	Seven Turns (1990); Shades of Two Worlds (1991); An Evening with the Allman Brothers Band: First Set (1992); Where It All Begins (1994); An Evening with the Allman Brothers Band: 2nd Set (1995); Hittin' the Note (2003); One Way Out (2004)
	Allen Woody	1989–1997 (died 2000)	bass; backing vocals	Seven Turns (1990); Shades of Two Worlds (1991); An Evening with the Allman Brothers Band: First Set (1992); Where It All Begins (1994); An Evening with the Allman Brothers Band: 2nd Set (1995)
	Johnny Neel	1989–1990 (died 2024)	piano; synthesizers; harmonica; backing vocals	Seven Turns (1990)
	Marc Quiñones	1991–2014	congas; percussion; drums; backing vocals	Shades of Two Worlds (1991); An Evening with the Allman Brothers Band: First Set (1992); Where It All Begins (1994); An Evening with the Allman Brothers Band: 2nd Set (1995); Peakin' at the Beacon (2000); Hittin' the Note (2003); One Way Out (2004)
	Oteil Burbridge	1997–2014	bass; backing and occasional lead vocals	Peakin' at the Beacon (2000); Hittin' the Note (2003); One Way Out (2004)
	Jack Pearson	1997–1999	lead and slide guitars; backing vocals	none
	Derek Trucks	1999–2014	lead and slide guitars	Peakin' at the Beacon (2000); Hittin' the Note (2003); One Way Out (2004)
	Jimmy Herring	2000	lead and slide guitars	none

== Lineups ==
All lineup changes taken from the band's official website.

Period	Members	Releases
March 1969 – October 1971	Gregg Allman – organ, piano, vocals; Duane Allman – lead and slide guitars; Dickey Betts – lead guitar, vocals; Berry Oakley – bass, backing vocals; Butch Trucks – drums, percussion; Jaimoe – drums, percussion; Additional Musicians: Thom Doucette – harmonica (1970-1971) percussion (1970); Jim Stanti – tambourine (1971); Rudolph "Juicy" Carter – saxophone (1971)	The Allman Brothers Band (1969); Idlewild South (1970); At Fillmore East (1971); Eat a Peach (1972); Live at Ludlow Garage: 1970 (1990); Fillmore East, February 1970 (1996); American University 12/13/70 (2002); Live at the Atlanta International Pop Festival (2003); S.U.N.Y. at Stonybrook: Stonybrook, NY 9/19/71 (2003); Boston Common, 8/17/71 (2007); Live from A&R Studios (2016); Fillmore West '71 (2019); The Final Note (2020); Down in Texas '71 (2021); Syria Mosque (2022)
October 1971 – October 1972	Gregg Allman – organ, piano, guitar, vocals; Dickey Betts – lead and slide guitars, vocals; Berry Oakley – bass, backing vocals; Butch Trucks – drums, percussion; Jaimoe – drums, percussion	Macon City Auditorium: 2/11/72 (2004); Manley Field House, Syracuse University, April 7, 1972 (2024)
October 1972 – November 1972	Gregg Allman – organ, guitar, vocals; Dickey Betts – lead and slide guitars, vocals; Chuck Leavell – piano, organ, backing vocals; Berry Oakley – bass, backing vocals; Butch Trucks – drums, percussion; Jaimoe – drums, percussion	Brothers and Sisters (1973) - two tracks
December 1972 – May 1976	Gregg Allman – organ, guitar, vocals; Dickey Betts – lead and slide guitars, vocals; Chuck Leavell – piano, organ, backing vocals; Lamar Williams – bass; Butch Trucks – drums, percussion; Jaimoe – drums, percussion	Brothers and Sisters (1973) - five tracks; Win, Lose or Draw (1975); Wipe the Windows, Check the Oil, Dollar Gas (1976); Nassau Coliseum, Uniondale, NY: 5/1/73 (2005)
Band inactive May 1976 – February 1979
February 1979 – November 1980	Gregg Allman – organ, piano, guitar, vocals; Dickey Betts – lead and slide guitars, vocals; Dan Toler – lead guitar; David Goldflies – bass; Butch Trucks – drums, percussion; Jaimoe – drums, percussion	Enlightened Rogues (1979); Reach for the Sky (1980)
November 1980 – January 1982	Gregg Allman – organ, guitar, vocals; Dickey Betts – lead and slide guitars, vocals; Dan Toler – lead guitar; Mike Lawler – piano, synthesizers, clavinet; David Goldflies – bass; Butch Trucks – drums, percussion; Frankie Toler – drums	Brothers of the Road (studio album, 1981); Brothers of the Road (concert video, 1982)
Band inactive January 1982 – June 1989
June 1989 – November 1990	Gregg Allman – organ, guitar, vocals; Dickey Betts – lead and slide guitars, vocals; Warren Haynes – lead and slide guitars, vocals; Johnny Neel – piano, synthesizers, harmonica; Allen Woody – bass, backing vocals; Butch Trucks – drums, percussion; Jaimoe – drums, percussion	Seven Turns (1990)
December 1990 – December 1991	Gregg Allman – organ, piano, guitar, vocals; Dickey Betts – lead and slide guitars, vocals; Warren Haynes – lead and slide guitars, vocals; Allen Woody – bass, backing vocals; Butch Trucks – drums, percussion; Jaimoe – drums, percussion	none
January 1992 – March 1997	Gregg Allman – organ, piano, guitar, vocals; Dickey Betts – lead and slide guitars, vocals; Warren Haynes – lead and slide guitars, vocals; Allen Woody – bass, backing vocals; Butch Trucks – drums, percussion; Jaimoe – drums, percussion; Marc Quiñones – percussion, drums, backing vocals; Additional Musicians: Thom Doucette – harmonica (1992)	Shades of Two Worlds (1991); Live at Great Woods (1992); An Evening with the Allman Brothers Band: First Set (1992); Where It All Begins (1994); An Evening with the Allman Brothers Band: 2nd Set (1995); Play All Night: Live at the Beacon Theatre 1992 (2014)
April 1997 – March 1999	Gregg Allman – organ, piano, guitar, vocals; Dickey Betts – lead and slide guitars, vocals; Jack Pearson – lead and slide guitars, backing vocals; Oteil Burbridge – bass; Butch Trucks – drums, percussion; Jaimoe – drums, percussion; Marc Quiñones – percussion, drums, backing vocals	none
April 1999 – June 2000	Gregg Allman – organ, piano, guitar, vocals; Dickey Betts – lead and slide guitars, vocals; Derek Trucks – lead and slide guitars; Oteil Burbridge – bass; Butch Trucks – drums, percussion; Jaimoe – drums, percussion; Marc Quiñones – percussion, drums, backing vocals	Peakin' at the Beacon (2000)
June 2000 – December 2000	Gregg Allman – organ, piano, guitar, vocals; Derek Trucks – lead and slide guitars; Jimmy Herring – lead and slide guitars; Oteil Burbridge – bass; Butch Trucks – drums, percussion; Jaimoe – drums, percussion; Marc Quiñones – percussion, drums, backing vocals	none
March 2001 – October 2014	Gregg Allman – organ, piano, guitar, vocals; Warren Haynes – lead and slide guitars, vocals; Derek Trucks – lead and slide guitars; Oteil Burbridge – bass; Butch Trucks – drums, percussion; Jaimoe – drums, percussion; Marc Quiñones – percussion, drums, backing vocals; Additional Musicians: Thom Doucette – harmonica (2009)	Hittin' the Note (2003); Live at the Beacon Theatre (2003); One Way Out (2004); 40 (2014); The Fox Box (2017); Cream of the Crop 2003 (2018); Warner Theatre, Erie, PA 7-19-05 (2020); Final Concert 10-28-14 (2024)
