= 40 (video) =

Video by The Allman Brothers Band
- Released: April 29, 2014
- Recorded: March 26, 2009
- Venues: Beacon Theatre, New York City
- Genres: Southern rock, blues rock
- Length: 152 minutes
- Label: Peach Records
- Producer: The Allman Brothers Band

The Allman Brothers Band chronology
Play All Night: Live at the Beacon Theatre 1992 (2014)	40 (2014)	Live from A&R Studios (2016)

40 is a concert video by the Allman Brothers Band. It was recorded at the Beacon Theatre in New York City on March 26, 2009. It was released as a DVD on April 29, 2014.

This concert marked the 40th anniversary of the Allman Brothers Band. For the occasion they performed all the songs in order from their first two albums, The Allman Brothers Band and Idlewild South. The show features the 2001 to 2014 lineup of the group – Gregg Allman (keyboards, vocals), Warren Haynes (guitar, vocals), Derek Trucks (guitar), Oteil Burbridge (bass), Butch Trucks (drums), Jaimoe (drums), and Marc Quiñones (congas, percussion, vocals).

== Critical reception ==
Professional ratings
Review scores
Source	Rating
Classic Rock Revisited	B+

In Glide Magazine Doug Collette wrote, "... 40 is so impeccably recorded in audio and video (the latter of which makes an often cheesy light show look impressive), it is comparable to 2003's Live at the Beacon Theatre DVD... 40's skillful camera angles, including as many panoramic shots as face to face close-ups of the players, present a scintillating vision of a band that over the decades has lost, recovered and maintained its unity in such a way it's turned the passage of time into a means of transcendence."

Larson Sutton of Jambands.com stated: "Ostensibly the show is in recognition of four decades, but the real recipient of the tribute is Duane Allman and those two magical years he spent leading the group to glorious heights of blues-based improvisation... throughout 40 it's overwhelmingly obvious how respected he remains, how persistent his influence and innovations are on his current interpreters Haynes and Trucks, and how the Allman Brothers Band has endured in those subsequent 38 years."

Writing for Classic Rock Revisited, Jeb Wright commented: "This is a celebration of much more than a band's fourth decade of existence. It is a celebration of a band that changed the history of music forever. This one should be owned, played and played again by anyone who truly loves rock and roll."

== Track listing ==
First set:

1. "Don't Want You No More" (Spencer Davis, Eddie Hardin)
2. "It's Not My Cross to Bear" (Gregg Allman)
3. "Black Hearted Woman" (Allman)
4. "Trouble No More" (McKinley Morganfield)
5. "Every Hungry Woman" (Allman)
6. "Dreams" (Allman)
7. "Whipping Post" (Allman)

Second set:

8. "Revival" (Dickey Betts)
9. "Don't Keep Me Wonderin'" (Allman)
10. "Midnight Rider" (Allman, Robert Kim Payne)
11. "In Memory of Elizabeth Reed" (Betts)
12. "Hoochie Coochie Man" (Willie Dixon)
13. "Please Call Home" (Allman)
14. "Leave My Blues at Home" (Allman)

Encore:

15. "Statesboro Blues" (Will McTell)

== Personnel ==
The Allman Brothers Band

- Gregg Allman – Hammond B-3 organ, piano, vocals
- Warren Haynes – guitar, vocals
- Derek Trucks – guitar
- Oteil Burbridge – bass
- Butch Trucks – drums
- Jaimoe – drums
- Marc Quiñones – congas, percussion, vocals

Additional Musicians

- Thom Doucette – harmonica

Production

- Produced by the Allman Brothers Band
- Audio producer: Warren Haynes
- Executive producer: Bert Holman
- Video director: Craig Grunemeyer
- Chief engineer: Edward D'Amico
- Live audio engineer: Colin Cargile
- Live audio multi-track recording: Bruce "Slim" Judd
- Liner notes: John Lynskey
