= Beginnings (Allman Brothers Band album) =

Compilation album by the Allman Brothers Band
- Released: 1973
- Recorded: 1969–1970
- Genre: Southern rock
- Length: 64:08
- Label: Atco
- Producers: Adrian Barber (tracks 1–7); Tom Dowd (tracks 8–12, 14); Joel Dorn (track 13)

The Allman Brothers Band chronology
Eat a Peach (1972)	Beginnings (1973)	Brothers and Sisters (1973)

Professional ratings
Review scores
Source	Rating
Allmusic	5/5 stars
Rolling Stone	5/5 stars
Encyclopedia of Popular Music	4/5 stars

Beginnings is a 1973 reissue of the Allman Brothers Band's first two albums, The Allman Brothers Band and Idlewild South, made to capitalize on the band's popularity since those records had first come out. Beginnings also includes extensive liner notes by writer Jean-Charles Costa that gave many fans their first coherent view of the band's history, as well as useful guidelines for how to tell Duane Allman's guitar parts from those of Dickey Betts. The front cover depicts them at one of their many famous performances at the Fillmore East.

For Beginnings, the band's debut album was remixed by Tom Dowd, replacing Adrian Barber's original mix.

== Track listing ==
All tracks are written by Gregg Allman, unless otherwise noted.

The Allman Brothers Band
No.	Title	Writer(s)	Length
1.	"Don't Want You No More"	Spencer Davis, Edward Hardin	2:25
2.	"It's Not My Cross to Bear"		4:56
3.	"Black Hearted Woman"		5:18
4.	"Trouble No More"	Muddy Waters	3:48
5.	"Every Hungry Woman"		4:17
6.	"Dreams"		7:17
7.	"Whipping Post"		5:22

Idlewild South
No.	Title	Writer(s)	Length
8.	"Revival"	Dickey Betts	4:06
9.	"Don't Keep Me Wonderin'"		3:31
10.	"Midnight Rider"	Gregg Allman, Robert Payne	2:58
11.	"In Memory of Elizabeth Reed"	Dickey Betts	6:56
12.	"Hoochie Coochie Man"	Willie Dixon	4:57
13.	"Please Call Home"		4:00
14.	"Leave My Blues at Home"		4:17
Total length:			64:08

== Personnel ==
Personnel on original albums, see:

- The Allman Brothers Band
- Idlewild South

Personnel of this compilation:

- Chuck Pulin – cover and liner photos
- Sue Poyneer – album design
- Jean-Charles Costa – liner notes

== Charts ==
Chart (1973)	Peak position
Canada Top Albums/CDs (RPM)	38
US Billboard 200	25

== Certifications ==
Region	Certification	Certified units/sales
United States (RIAA)	Gold	500,000^{^}
^{^} Shipments figures based on certification alone.
