= Play All Night: Live at the Beacon Theatre 1992 =

Live album by The Allman Brothers Band
- Released: February 18, 2014
- Recorded: March 10–11, 1992
- Genre: Southern rock
- Length: 139:44
- Label: Epic/Legacy
- Producers: Warren Haynes, Tom Dowd

The Allman Brothers Band chronology
| Boston Common, 8/17/71 (2007) | Play All Night: Live at the Beacon Theatre 1992 (2014) | 40 (2014) |

Play All Night: Live at the Beacon Theatre 1992 is a two-CD live album by the Allman Brothers Band. It was recorded at the Beacon Theatre in New York City on March 10 and 11, 1992. It was released on the Epic/Legacy label on February 18, 2014.

== Critical reception ==
Professional ratings
Review scores
| Source | Rating |
|---|---|
| All About Jazz | 4.5/5 stars |
| AllMusic | 4/5 stars |
| Classic Rock Revisited | A+ |
| Mojo | 3/5 stars |
| Premier Guitar | 4/5 stars |

On AllMusic, Steve Legett wrote, "the world can always use another live Allman Brothers Band release — perhaps it helps to think of this band in the same way one looks at the various classic quartets and quintets of jazz artists like Miles Davis or John Coltrane. It's the songs, yeah, but it's also who's playing those songs, and all the little improv twists and turns that come with that."

On Jambands.com, Brian Robbins said, "The gold to be found in this 2-CD set is the presence of guitarist/vocalist Warren Haynes and the late Allen Woody on bass.... The Allman Brothers Band had some pretty powerful hoodoo under the hood in 1992 and was firing on all cylinders at the Beacon that March. Play All Night captures something that was unique to that combination of talents."

In Premier Guitar, John Bohlinger wrote, "Play All Night benefits greatly from the warm, round fuzz of Allen Woody's bass, a force of groove and attitude that you won't find on the other live Allman Brothers recordings."

In a review for All About Jazz, Doug Collette commented: "as much as the arrangements and the musicianship is polished, there's a raw abandon to the music... the Allmans exhibit as much of a sense of adventure as consummate skill, both individually and collectively."

Jeb Wright of Classic Rock Revisited stated that the album is "as exciting and fresh sounding as ever, and is one of the best live efforts the band has ever laid down on tape."

Writing for Relix, Larson Sutton noted that the album is "representative of the septet firing on all cylinders," and remarked: "Still fresh and still out to prove something, it's the influence of Haynes, Woody, and Quinones that spurs the veterans to reach back into the catalog of classics with fresh ears, and to add new songs equal to the high standard of the early days."

== Track listing ==
Disc 1

1. "Statesboro Blues" (Blind Willie McTell) – 7:01
2. "You Don't Love Me" (Willie Cobbs) – 6:38
3. "End of the Line" (Gregg Allman, Warren Haynes, Allen Woody, John Jaworowicz) – 5:45
4. "Blue Sky" (Dickey Betts) – 7:34
5. "Nobody Knows" (Dickey Betts) – 13:20
6. "Low Down Dirty Mean" (Dickey Betts, Johnny Neel) – 7:20
7. "Seven Turns" (Dickey Betts) – 4:41
8. "Midnight Rider" (Gregg Allman, Robert Payne) – 3:20
9. "Come On in My Kitchen" (Robert Johnson) – 6:02

Disc 2

1. Guitar intro / "Hoochie Coochie Man" (Willie Dixon) – 10:01
2. "Jessica" (Dickey Betts) – 10:01
3. "Get On With Your Life" (Gregg Allman) – 8:18
4. "In Memory of Elizabeth Reed" (Dickey Betts) – 20:57
5. "Revival" (Dickey Betts) – 5:45
6. "Dreams" (Gregg Allman) – 11:20
7. "Whipping Post" (Gregg Allman) – 11:36

== Personnel ==
Allman Brothers Band

- Gregg Allman – organ, piano, acoustic guitar, lead vocals
- Dickey Betts – electric guitar, acoustic guitar, lead vocals
- Jaimoe – drums, background vocals
- Butch Trucks – drums, tympani, background vocals
- Warren Haynes – electric guitar, acoustic guitar, background vocals, lead vocals on “Hoochie Coochie Man”
- Allen Woody – bass guitar, acoustic bass, background vocals
- Marc Quiñones – congas, percussion

Additional musicians

- Thom Doucette – harmonica

Production

- Produced for release by Warren Haynes
- Original recordings produced by Tom Dowd
- Executive producer: Jerry Rappaport
- Recording: Jay Mark
- Mixing: Chris Shaw
- Mastering: Joe Palmaccio
- Engineering: David Hewitt, Phil Gitomer, Dave Roberts
- Photography: Kirk West
- Art direction, design: Rob Carter
- Liner notes: John Lynskey

== Selections from Play All Night LP ==
A two-disc vinyl LP called Selections from Play All Night: Live at the Beacon Theatre 1992 was released on April 19, 2014, in conjunction with Record Store Day. The record album, produced as a limited edition of 4,000 copies, contains 10 of the 16 tracks from the CD.

Side one

1. "Statesboro Blues" (McTell)
2. "End of the Line" (Allman, Haynes, Jaworowicz, Woody)
3. "Blue Sky" (Betts)
4. "Midnight Rider" (Allman, Payne)

Side two

1. "Hoochie Coochie Man" (Dixon)
2. "Dreams" (Allman)
3. "Revival" (Betts)

Side three

1. "In Memory of Elizabeth Reed" (Betts)

Side four

1. "Jessica" (Betts)
2. "Whipping Post" (Allman)

== Charts ==
Chart performance for Play All Night: Live at the Beacon Theatre 1992
| Chart (2014) | Peak position |
|---|---|
| US Billboard 200 | 43 |
