= Rosemont Theatre, Chicago, 9/01/04 =

Live album by Allman Brothers Band
- Released: 2004
- Genre: Southern rock
- Label: Instant Live

Rosemont Theatre, Chicago, 9/01/04 is an Instant Live album by the Allman Brothers Band. It was recorded at the Rosemont Theatre in Rosemont, Illinois, near Chicago, on September 1, 2004.

== Track listing ==
Disc one

1. "Mountain Jam" (17:39)
2. "I Walk on Gilded Splinters" (6:12)
3. "Dreams" (9:58)
4. "Midnight Rider" (3:35)
5. "Worried Down with the Blues" (8:39)
6. "The Night They Drove Old Dixie Down" (5:36)

Disc two

1. "Black Hearted Woman" (6:27)
2. "Come On in My Kitchen" (6:43)
3. "Why Does Love Got to Be So Sad?" (7:38)
4. "Franklin's Tower" (8:59)
5. "Instrumental Illness" (32:58)

Disc three

1. "Stormy Monday" (9:59)
2. "Good Morning Little Schoolgirl" (10:32)
3. "Soulshine" (6:53)
4. "Statesboro Blues" (7:54)
5. "Mountain Jam" (8:19)

== Personnel ==
- Gregg Allman – organ, vocals
- Warren Haynes – guitar, vocals
- Derek Trucks – guitar
- Oteil Burbridge – bass
- Butch Trucks – drums
- Jai Johanny "Jaimoe" Johanson – drums, congas
