= At Fillmore East =

Live album by the Allman Brothers Band
- Released: July 6, 1971
- Recorded: March 12–13, 1971
- Venue: Fillmore East (New York City)
- Genres: Blues rock; Southern rock; Jam band
- Length: 76:22 (1971 release); 132:11 (1992 reissue); 134:58 (2003 reissue); 365:03 (2014 reissue)
- Label: Capricorn
- Producer: Tom Dowd

The Allman Brothers Band chronology
Idlewild South (1970)	At Fillmore East (1971)	Eat a Peach (1972)

At Fillmore East is the first live album by American rock band the Allman Brothers Band, and their third release overall. Produced by Tom Dowd, the album was released on July 6, 1971, in the United States, by Capricorn Records. As the title indicates, the recording took place at the New York City music venue Fillmore East, which was run by concert promoter Bill Graham. It was recorded over the course of three nights in March 1971 (only two nights were used for the album) and features the band performing extended jam versions of songs such as "Whipping Post", "You Don't Love Me" and "In Memory of Elizabeth Reed". When first commercially released, it was issued as a double LP with just seven songs across four vinyl sides.

At Fillmore East was the band's artistic and commercial breakthrough, rapidly increasing the band's exposure and garnering them a new legion of fans. It has since been widely regarded as one of the greatest live albums of all time and the start of the band's association with the jam band school of music (although members of the band have repudiated the label, stating instead they are just "a band that jams"). It has also been ranked as one of the best albums of all time and continues to be a top seller in the band's catalog, becoming their first album to receive a Platinum certification from the Recording Industry Association of America (RIAA). In 2004, the album was selected for preservation in the Library of Congress by the National Recording Registry, deemed to be "culturally, historically, or aesthetically significant".

== Background ==
Shortly after completing recording of their second album, Idlewild South, in July 1970, the Allman Brothers were playing a show in Miami. British supergroup lead guitarist Eric Clapton had formed an intentionally anonymous new band – Derek and the Dominos – and begun recording what was to become the iconic double-album Layla and Other Assorted Love Songs there. Stalled, Clapton had indicated to album producer Tom Dowd that he was interested in meeting Allman, whose session work on Wilson Pickett's 1968 cover of The Beatles' "Hey Jude" he particularly admired; in turn, Allman was a huge fan of Clapton's playing with the band Cream. The pair were introduced after the August 26 show, and jammed together until the next afternoon. "Instant soulmates", Clapton invited Allman to join the "Layla" sessions, with Allman ending up contributing memorable guitar licks to all but three songs on the album. Afterwards, Clapton invited Allman to join the Dominoes and tour with them; according to band biographer Alan Paul Allman considered it, and indeed Allman appeared in a few concerts with the band, but in the end returned to Allman Brothers after missing a string of several shows.

Mirroring the band's initial 1969 release, The Allman Brothers Band, Idlewild South failed to achieve strong commercial success, though the band's popularity and reputation began to increase due to their live performances. The band played continuously in 1970, performing over 300 dates on the road traveling in a Ford Econoline van and later, a Winnebago, nicknamed the Wind Bag. During this time, the group began struggling with drug addictions. With the exception of the brothers, everyone in the group was barely making a living. Vocalist Gregg Allman received additional money from songwriter royalty payments and Duane from session work, but conditions on the road were difficult for everyone. In a dispute over withheld band pay, tour manager Twiggs Lyndon stabbed and killed a promoter. Their fortunes began to change over the course of 1971, where the band's average earnings doubled.

The Allman Brothers Band had first played Fillmore East in December 1969, opening for Blood, Sweat & Tears for three nights. Promoter Bill Graham enjoyed the band and promised to have them back soon. In January 1970, the band opened for Buddy Guy and B.B. King at San Francisco's Fillmore West, and one month later at Fillmore East supporting the Grateful Dead. According to biographer Alan Paul, "these shows were crucial in establishing the band and exposing them to a wider, sympathetic audience on both coasts." Drummer Butch Trucks considered their performances at the Fillmore East to be the launching pad for their success. In 1970, Duane Allman told disc jockey Ed Shane, "You know, we get kind of frustrated doing the [studio] records, and I think, consequently, our next album will be ... a live recording, to get some of that natural fire on it." "We were not intentionally trying to buck the system, but keeping each song down to 3:14 just didn't work for us," remembered Gregg Allman. "And we realized that the audience was a big part of what we did, which couldn't be duplicated in a studio. A lightbulb finally went off; we needed to make a live album."

== Recording and production ==
At Fillmore East was recorded over two nights, March 12 and 13, 1971, with the band playing two shows each night at $1,250 per show. Recordings from an earlier night's shows were dropped, because they had horns which were deemed unhelpful. The shows were typical performances for the band, and regarded as slightly above average by drummer Jai Johanny Johanson. Ads for the shows read: "Bill Graham Presents in New York — Johnny Winter And, Elvin Bishop Group, Extra Added Attraction: Allman Brothers." While Winter was billed as headliner, by the third night the Allman Brothers were closing the show.

Tom Dowd produced At Fillmore East; he had previously worked on the band's second studio album, Idlewild South. He had recently returned from Africa from working on the documentary film Soul to Soul, and stayed in New York several days to oversee the live recording. "It was a good truck, with a 16-track machine and a great, tough-as-nails staff who took care of business," recalled Dowd. He gave the staff suggestions and noted the band had two lead guitarists and two drummers, "which was unusual, and it took some foresight to properly capture the dynamics." Things went smoothly until the band unexpectedly brought out saxophonist Rudolph "Juicy" Carter, an unknown horn player, and longstanding "unofficial" band member Thom Doucette on harmonica. "I was just hoping we could isolate them, so we could wipe them and use the songs, but they started playing and the horns were leaking all over everything, rendering the songs unusable," said Dowd. He rushed to Duane during the break to tell him to cut the horn players; while Duane loved the players, he put up no fight with Dowd. The final show was delayed because of a bomb scare, and did not end until 6 am.

Each night following the shows, the musicians and Dowd would "grab some beers and sandwiches" and head to Manhattan's Atlantic Studios to go over the performances. Set lists for following shows were crafted by listening to the recordings and going over what they could keep and what they would need to capture once more. "We wanted to give ourselves plenty of times to do it because we didn't want to go back and overdub anything, because then it wouldn't have been a real live album," said Gregg Allman. In the end, the band only edited out Doucette's harmonica when it did not fit. "That was our pinnacle," said Dickey Betts later. "The Fillmore days are definitely the most cherished memories that I have. If you asked everybody in the band, they would probably say that."

On June 27, the Fillmore East closed, and the band were invited to play a final, invitation-only concert, along with Edgar Winter, the Beach Boys and Country Joe McDonald. The Beach Boys initially refused to perform unless they headlined the event, but Graham refused, telling them that the Allman Brothers would be closing the show, and they were free to leave if they disagreed. This Allman Brothers' performance was used for the second disc of the 2006 expanded version of the 1972 follow-up album to At Fillmore East, Eat a Peach.

== Writing ==
At Fillmore East showcases the band's eclectic mixture of blues, rock, country, and jazz. "Fusion is a term that came later, but if you wanted to look at a fusion album, it would be Fillmore East. Here was a rock 'n' roll band playing blues in the jazz vernacular. And they tore the place up," said Dowd. Stage Manager Michael Ahern opens At Fillmore East with a simple introduction: "Okay, the Allman Brothers Band." Duane Allman biographer Randy Poe describes it as "the only low-key moment over the course of the [show]." The cover of Blind Willie McTell's "Statesboro Blues" which opens the set showcases Duane Allman's slide guitar work in open E tuning. "Statesboro Blues" bears close resemblance to Taj Mahal's 1968 rendition, which had inspired Duane to pick up slide guitar playing. "Done Somebody Wrong" follows, and is introduced by Duane as "an old Elmore James song ... This is an old true story ..." Thom Doucette takes a solo on blues harp, and by the end of the song, the band breaks out of the shuffle and "builds up to a dual-lead guitar, triplet-based crescendo." "Stormy Monday" echoes the band's blues roots, and many guitar parts come from the version cut by Bobby "Blue" Bland in the early 1960s. Allman and Betts trade solos, as does Gregg Allman on the organ as the tempo shifts into a "swinging" beat. "You Don't Love Me" kicks off the first of the jazz-inspired jams and features a solo from Duane Allman in which the entire group stops, leaving it just him and his guitar. The song's conclusion quotes the Christian hymn "Joy to the World". "Hot 'Lanta" is an instrumental, which has elements in common with jazz rock and progressive rock, and is a showcase for Berry Oakley's bass-playing. "In Memory of Elizabeth Reed", with its harmonized melody, Latin feel, and burning drive invited comparisons with jazz saxophonist John Coltrane (especially Duane's solo-ending pull-offs, a direct nod to the musician). The performance begins with a "long, laconic intro" by Betts employing volume swells, reminiscent of the "dreamy trumpet" used to open songs on Miles Davis' Kind of Blue (1959). "Whipping Post" (opening in 11/8 time, unusual territory for a rock band) by this point had become one of the longest jams in the band's set; the original album version runs five minutes, while the At Fillmore East version exceeds 23. Aside from the opening bassline and lyrics, the two versions are completely unalike. Again, Betts and Allman trade long guitar solos, with one of Betts' solos quoting what would later become the main theme for the song "Les Brers in A Minor", as featured on the band's 1972 album Eat a Peach. The song includes a false ending which quotes the theme of the French nursery rhyme song "Frère Jacques", and finally closes with "long, sustained notes" from Allman opposite Trucks' kettledrum. Applause concludes the album and the song fades out. During the fadeout, Trucks begins playing the tympani intro to "Mountain Jam", followed by its initial guitar licks; the song would be released in its entirety on the band's 1972 follow-up album, Eat a Peach.

== Artwork ==
The band devised the cover idea for At Fillmore East rather than leaving it in the hands of Atlantic executives (Duane Allman was particularly disgusted with the artwork for Sam & Dave's Hold On, I'm Comin', although that album's artwork was created by Stax Records, which Atlantic had previously distributed). Initially, the album cover was to be shots of the band taken in front of the Fillmore East with their names on the marquee above them, but no one was satisfied with the results. The band's main purpose for the cover was that it be as "meat and potatoes" as the band's ethos and performing, and someone suggested the band make it a photograph of the band with their gear waiting to go onstage.

The image was shot by photographer Jim Marshall one morning in the band's home of Macon, Georgia. The group were not very happy about being woken up early to pose ("we figured it didn't make a damn bit of difference what the cover was or what time we took it," said guitarist Dickey Betts). Normally the band hated being photographed; the cover of later retrospective release The Fillmore Concerts shows them displaying terminal boredom. However, during the session, Duane spotted a dealer friend, raced over and grabbed a bag of cocaine, then returned to his seat, discreetly clutching the stash in his lap. This made the whole band laugh, resulting in a memorable image. Marshall stenciled the album title on one of the road cases, which were stacked in front of the wall.

The back cover shows their road crew gathered in the same spot with 16 oz "tallboys" of Pabst Blue Ribbon beer, provided by the photographer as a reward to the roadies for lugging out and stacking the band's heavy equipment for the shoot. Among the crew on the back cover are Joseph "Red Dog" Campbell, Kim Payne, Mike Callahan, and then-newest members Joe Dan Petty and Willie Perkins. Duane Allman had suggested the crew be featured on the rear cover, as all involved viewed them the "unsung heroes" in the operation. A photo of Lyndon, then in jail awaiting his trial, was superimposed to the wall behind the crew.

== Release and critical reception ==
Professional ratings
Review scores
Source	Rating
Allmusic	5/5 stars
Pitchfork	9.2/10
Robert Christgau	B−
Rolling Stone	5/5 stars
Encyclopedia of Popular Music	4/5 stars

At Fillmore East was released in July 1971 by Capricorn Records as a double album, but reduced near the cost of a single LP. Atlantic and Atco initially rejected the idea of issuing a double album, with Jerry Wexler feeling it "ridiculous to preserve all these jams." Manager Phil Walden explained to executives that live performances, rather than making studio recordings, were most important to them. In all, the album featured seven songs spread over two vinyl discs. The album received strong initial sales. While previous albums by the band had taken months to hit the charts (often near the bottom of the top 200), the record started to climb the charts after a matter of days. At Fillmore East peaked at number thirteen on Billboard's Top Pop Albums chart, and was certified gold by the Recording Industry Association of America that October. The album was certified platinum on August 25, 1992.

In a contemporary review, George Kimball of Rolling Stone magazine said that "The Allman Brothers had many fine moments at the Fillmores, and this live double album (recorded March 12th and 13th of this year) must surely epitomize all of them." Kimball cited the band as "the best damn rock and roll band this country has produced in the past five years" and said of comparisons to the Grateful Dead at the time, "The range of their material and the more tenuous fact that they also use two drummers have led to what I suppose are inevitable comparisons to the Dead in its better days." In a less enthusiastic review for The Village Voice, Robert Christgau gave At Fillmore East a "B−" grade and said the songs "sure do boogie", but ultimately found it musically aimless: "even if Duane Allman plus Dickey Betts does equal Jerry Garcia, the Dead know roads are for getting somewhere. That is, Garcia (not to bring in John Coltrane) always takes you someplace unexpected on a long solo. I guess the appeal here is the inevitability of it all."

In a retrospective review, AllMusic editor Stephen Thomas Erlewine gave the album five out of five stars and stated, "[it] remains the pinnacle of the Allmans and Southern rock at its most elastic, bluesy, and jazzy". Mark Kemp of Rolling Stone gave it five stars in a 2002 review and commented that "these shows [...] remain the finest live rock performance ever committed to vinyl", and the album "captures America's best blues-rock band at its peak".

At Fillmore East was one of 50 recordings chosen in 2004 by the Library of Congress to be added to the National Recording Registry. Rolling Stone included it at number 49 in their 2003 list of The 500 Greatest Albums of All Time, describing it as "rock's greatest live double LP", maintaining the rating in a 2012 revision, and slipping to number 105 in the 2020 reboot of the list. The album was also included in the books 1001 Albums You Must Hear Before You Die (2005) and 1,000 Recordings to Hear Before You Die (2008). In the latter, author Tom Moon noted that, nearly forty years after its release, "[the album] remains one of the best live albums in rock history. Ornery and loud, it's perfect driving music for the road that goes on forever."

In 2020 The Independent newspaper rated it the best live album of all time.

== Track listing ==
Side one
No.	Title	Writer(s)	Length
1.	"Statesboro Blues"	Blind Willie McTell	4:08
2.	"Done Somebody Wrong"	Clarence Lewis, Bobby Robinson, Elmore James	4:05
3.	"Stormy Monday"	T-Bone Walker	8:31

Side two
No.	Title	Writer(s)	Length
1.	"You Don't Love Me"	Willie Cobbs	19:06

Side three
No.	Title	Writer(s)	Length
1.	"Hot 'Lanta"	Duane Allman, Gregg Allman, Dickey Betts, Butch Trucks, Berry Oakley, Jai Johanny Johanson	5:10
2.	"In Memory of Elizabeth Reed"	Dickey Betts	12:46

Side four
No.	Title	Writer(s)	Length
1.	"Whipping Post"	Gregg Allman	22:40

Recording dates:

- March 12 late show: "Done Somebody Wrong", second part of "You Don't Love Me"
- March 13 early show: "Statesboro Blues", "In Memory of Elizabeth Reed", first part of "You Don't Love Me"
- March 13 late show: "Stormy Monday", "Hot 'Lanta", "Whipping Post"

== Expanded editions ==
Over the years several expanded editions of At Fillmore East have been released.

=== The Fillmore Concerts ===
On October 10, 1992, The Fillmore Concerts, an expanded version of At Fillmore East, was released as a two-disc CD. It includes all the songs from the original album, plus the live songs from Eat a Peach – "One Way Out", "Trouble No More", and "Mountain Jam" – and two additional tracks – "Don't Keep Me Wonderin' " and "Drunken Hearted Boy" – all of which were recorded at the same concerts. The album was remixed from the concert recordings, and a few of the songs are alternate takes, so the same songs sound somewhat different from those on the original album.

Disc one
No.	Title	Writer(s)	Notes	Length
1.	"Statesboro Blues"	Blind Willie McTell	March 13 first show (cd notes incorrectly state 12th first show)	4:15
2.	"Trouble No More"	McKinley Morganfield	March 12 second show	3:46
3.	"Don't Keep Me Wonderin'"	Gregg Allman	March 13 first show	3:20
4.	"In Memory of Elizabeth Reed"	Dickey Betts	March 13 first show (not performed at March 13 second show)	12:59
5.	"One Way Out"	Elmore James; Marshall Sehorn; Sonny Boy Williamson	June 27	4:55
6.	"Done Somebody Wrong"	Elmore James; Clarence Lewis; Bobby Robinson	March 13 second show	4:11
7.	"Stormy Monday"	T-Bone Walker	March 13 second show	10:19
8.	"You Don't Love Me"	Willie Cobbs	March 13 first show/ March 12 second show	19:24

Disc two
No.	Title	Writer(s)	Notes	Length
1.	"Hot 'Lanta"	Duane Allman; Gregg Allman; Dickey Betts; Berry Oakley; Butch Trucks; Jai Johanny Johanson	March 12 second show	5:11
2.	"Whipping Post"	Gregg Allman	March 13 second show	22:37
3.	"Mountain Jam"	Donovan Leitch; D. Allman; G. Allman; Betts; Oakley; Trucks; Johanson	March 13 second show	33:41
4.	"Drunken Hearted Boy" (with Elvin Bishop)	Elvin Bishop	March 13 second show	7:33

=== At Fillmore East Deluxe Edition ===
The Deluxe Edition was released as a two-disc CD on September 23, 2003. It contains the same songs, in a slightly different order, as The Fillmore Concerts, and one additional track from the same concerts, "Midnight Rider". The Deluxe Edition is based on the master recordings for At Fillmore East and Eat a Peach, and so it sounds more similar to those albums than The Fillmore Concerts does.

Disc one
No.	Title	Writer(s)	Length
1.	"Statesboro Blues"	McTell	4:17
2.	"Trouble No More"	Morganfield	3:43
3.	"Don't Keep Me Wonderin'"	G. Allman	3:27
4.	"Done Somebody Wrong"	James; Lewis; Robinson	4:11
5.	"Stormy Monday"	Walker	10:19
6.	"One Way Out"	James; Sehorn; Williamson	4:55
7.	"In Memory of Elizabeth Reed"	Betts	12:59
8.	"You Don't Love Me"	Cobbs	19:24
9.	"Midnight Rider"	G. Allman; Robert Payne	2:55

Disc two
No.	Title	Writer(s)	Length
1.	"Hot 'Lanta"	D. Allman; G. Allman; Betts; Oakley; Trucks; Johanson	5:20
2.	"Whipping Post"	G. Allman	22:53
3.	"Mountain Jam"	Leitch; D. Allman; G. Allman; Betts; Oakley; Trucks; Johanson	33:41
4.	"Drunken Hearted Boy" (with Elvin Bishop)	Bishop	6:54

=== The 1971 Fillmore East Recordings ===
The 1971 Fillmore East Recordings was released on July 29, 2014. This six-CD boxed set contains the four complete concerts—the early and late shows from March 12 and March 13, 1971—from which the songs included on At Fillmore East were selected, plus the Allman Brothers' performance at the Fillmore East closing show on June 27, 1971. A three Blu-ray edition was also released which contains a multi-channel mix.

* = Previously unreleased track

# = Track selected for the original "At Fillmore East" Album

Disc one: March 12, 1971 – first show
No.	Title	Writer(s)	Length
1.	"Statesboro Blues" (*)	McTell	4:44
2.	"Trouble No More" (*)	Morganfield	3:47
3.	"Don't Keep Me Wonderin'" (*)	G. Allman	3:53
4.	"Done Somebody Wrong" (*)	James; Lewis; Robinson	4:24
5.	"In Memory of Elizabeth Reed" (*)	Betts	17:38
6.	"You Don't Love Me" (*)	Cobbs	14:58

Disc two: March 12, 1971 – second show
No.	Title	Writer(s)	Length
1.	"Statesboro Blues" (*)	McTell	4:29
2.	"Trouble No More"	Morganfield	4:04
3.	"Don't Keep Me Wonderin'" (*)	G. Allman	3:39
4.	"Done Somebody Wrong" (#)	James; Lewis; Robinson	4:56
5.	"In Memory of Elizabeth Reed" (*)	Betts	18:38
6.	"You Don't Love Me" (# – final 12 minutes)	Cobbs	19:13
7.	"Whipping Post" (*)	G. Allman	19:30
8.	"Hot 'Lanta"	D. Allman; G. Allman; Betts; Oakley; Trucks; Johanson	5:19

Disc three: March 13, 1971 – first show
No.	Title	Writer(s)	Length
1.	"Statesboro Blues" (#)	McTell	4:18
2.	"Trouble No More"	Morganfield	3:47
3.	"Don't Keep Me Wonderin'"	G. Allman	3:38
4.	"Done Somebody Wrong" (*)	James; Lewis; Robinson	4:08
5.	"In Memory of Elizabeth Reed" (#)	Betts	13:15
6.	"You Don't Love Me" (# – first 7 minutes)	Cobbs	19:50
7.	"Whipping Post" (*)	G. Allman	17:30

Disc four: March 13, 1971 – second show – Part 1
No.	Title	Writer(s)	Length
1.	"Statesboro Blues" (*)	McTell	4:43
2.	"One Way Out" (*)	James; Sehorn; Williamson	4:40
3.	"Stormy Monday" (#)	Walker	10:39
4.	"Hot 'Lanta" (#)	D. Allman; G. Allman; Betts; Oakley; Trucks; Johanson	5:31
5.	"Whipping Post" (#)	G. Allman	23:05

Disc five: March 13, 1971 – second show – Part 2
No.	Title	Writer(s)	Length
1.	"Mountain Jam"	Leitch; D. Allman; G. Allman; Betts; Oakley; Trucks; Johanson	35:39
2.	"Drunken Hearted Boy" (with Elvin Bishop)	Bishop	7:45

Disc six: June 27, 1971 – Fillmore East closing show
No.	Title	Writer(s)	Length
1.	"Introduction by Bill Graham / Statesboro Blues" (*)	McTell	5:31
2.	"Don't Keep Me Wonderin'"	G. Allman	3:47
3.	"Done Somebody Wrong"	James; Lewis; Robinson	3:36
4.	"One Way Out"	James; Sehorn; Williamson	5:24
5.	"In Memory of Elizabeth Reed"	Betts	12:33
6.	"Midnight Rider"	G. Allman; Payne	3:07
7.	"Hot 'Lanta"	D. Allman; G. Allman; Betts; Oakley; Trucks; Johanson	5:48
8.	"Whipping Post"	G. Allman	20:14
9.	"You Don't Love Me"	Cobbs	17:23

== Other Fillmore East recordings ==
- Eat a Peach – contains "Trouble No More" from March 13, 1971 (Show 1) and "Mountain Jam" from March 13, 1971 (Show 2) and "One Way Out" from June 27, 1971
- Duane Allman: An Anthology contains "Don't Keep Me Wonderin' " from March 13, 1971 (Show 1)
- Duane Allman Anthology, Vol. 2 contains "Midnight Rider" from June 27, 1971
- Dreams contains "Drunken Hearted Boy" from March 13, 1971 (Show 2)
- Eat a Peach, Deluxe Edition – second CD (the final Fillmore East concert) also contains "Statesboro Blues", "Don't Keep Me Wonderin' ", "Done Somebody Wrong", "One Way Out", "In Memory of Elizabeth Reed", "Midnight Rider", "Hot 'Lanta", "Whipping Post", and "You Don't Love Me" from June 27, 1971
- The Road Goes On Forever contains "Statesboro Blues" from March 12, 1971 (Disc 1).

== Personnel ==
The Allman Brothers Band

- Duane Allman – lead guitar, slide guitar
- Gregg Allman – organ, piano, vocals
- Dickey Betts – lead guitar
- Berry Oakley – bass guitar
- Jai Johanny Johanson – drums, congas, timbales
- Butch Trucks – drums, timpani

Guest musicians

- Thom Doucette – harmonica on "Don't Keep Me Wonderin'", "Done Somebody Wrong", "One Way Out", "Stormy Monday" and "You Don't Love Me"
- Jim Santi – tambourine

Guest musicians (The Fillmore Concerts and The 1971 Fillmore East Recordings)

- Bobby Caldwell – percussion on "Drunken Hearted Boy" and on March 12 shows starting with "In Memory of Elizabeth Reed"
- Rudolph ("Juici") Carter – soprano saxophone on (only) both March 12 shows, starting with "In Memory of Elizabeth Reed"
- Elvin Bishop – vocals on "Drunken Hearted Boy"
- Steve Miller – piano on "Drunken Hearted Boy"

Production (At Fillmore East)

- Tom Dowd – producer, liner notes
- Bruce Malamut – assistant producer
- Aaron Baron – engineer
- Sam Whiteside – engineer
- Larry Dahlstrom – assistant Engineer
- Dennis M. Drake – mastering
- Jim Marshall – photography

Production (The Fillmore Concerts)

- Tom Dowd – producer
- Jay Mark – mixer
- Dan Kincaid – digital mastering
- Bill Levenson – executive producer
- Kirk West – associate producer
- Terri Tierney – project coordination
- Richard Bauer – art direction
- Jim Marshall – graphic concept
- Jimmy Guterman – liner notes
- John Perkins – Best Boy

== Charts ==
Chart (1971)	Peak position
Canada Top Albums/CDs (RPM)	44
US Billboard 200	13

== Certifications ==
Region	Certification	Certified units/sales
United Kingdom (BPI) 1998 release	Silver	60,000^{‡}
United States (RIAA)	Platinum	1,000,000^{^}
^{^} Shipments figures based on certification alone.^{‡} Sales+streaming figures based on certification alone.
