= Thom Doucette =

- Also known as: "The Ace"
- Origin: Sarasota, Florida, U.S.
- Genres: Blues, southern rock
- Occupations: Musician, Instructor
- Instrument: Harmonica
- Years active: 1970–present

Thom "Ace" Doucette is an American blues harmonica player from the Sarasota, Florida region. He is best known for having played with The Allman Brothers Band in the 1970s and later, although he was never an official member.

In his early days as a musician, Doucette was a friend of bassist Berry Oakley; guitarist Dickey Betts occasionally ran into the pair in Florida clubs. Once the Allman Brothers Band had formed with Oakley and Betts as members, Doucette became friendly with group leader Duane Allman, who bestowed upon him the moniker "The Ace".

Doucette appears on the group's second album, Idlewild South in 1970, playing harmonica and percussion. In particular his harmonica is featured on the track "Don't Keep Me Wonderin'", where it plays along and against the slide guitar of Duane Allman; towards the end the two merge together. Doucette joined the band frequently when they played the Fillmore East in New York, and consequently his harmonica solos are featured on two of the tracks from the classic 1971 live album At Fillmore East, those being "Done Somebody Wrong" and "You Don't Love Me". (A solo on a third song, "Stormy Monday", was edited out of the original album release but restored in some later editions.)

Duane Allman tried to convince Doucette to formally join the group, but Doucette declined. As Gregg Allman recalled of Doucette in his memoir, "I don't think he wanted the responsibility. I don't think he wanted to have to be anywhere at any time—Thom just kind of drifts, still to this day." Doucette was one of the musicians who played at Duane Allman's funeral later in 1971.

Doucette would perform again with the band in the early 1990s, following the group's 1989 reformation; one of those appearances is included on the 1992 live album An Evening with the Allman Brothers Band: First Set. Remaining a Sarasota resident, he sometimes appeared at individual Betts or Gregg Allman shows in the Florida area. He again appeared with the full band at its 40th anniversary shows during its 2009 Beacon run in New York.

Besides his activities as a musician, Doucette also became a yoga instructor in the Sarasota area.

== Discography ==
With The Allman Brothers Band

- Idlewind South (1970)
- At Fillmore East (1971)
- Eat a Peach (1972) (on tracks 3–5)
- An Evening with the Allman Brothers Band: First Set (1992)
- 40 (2014)
