= Live at Ludlow Garage: 1970 =

Live album by The Allman Brothers Band
- Released: April 20, 1990
- Recorded: April 11, 1970
- Venue: Ludlow Garage - Cincinnati, OH
- Genre: Southern rock Blues rock Jam rock
- Length: 1:30:50
- Label: Polydor
- Producer: Bill Levenson

The Allman Brothers Band chronology
Dreams (1989)	Live at Ludlow Garage: 1970 (1990)	Seven Turns (1990)

Professional ratings
Review scores
Source	Rating
Allmusic	4.5/5 stars
Rolling Stone	3/5 stars
Encyclopedia of Popular Music	3/5 stars
Select	3/5 medals

Live at Ludlow Garage: 1970 is an album by the Allman Brothers Band. It was recorded live at Ludlow Garage in Cincinnati on April 11, 1970. It was released by Polydor Records on April 20, 1990.

"Dimples" and "I'm Gonna Move to the Outskirts of Town" had already been released about a year earlier on the Dreams box set.

The entire recording, including an unreleased rendition of "In Memory of Elizabeth Reed", was remastered and released on a 2015 reissue of Idlewild South.

== Track listing ==
=== Disc One ===
1. "Dreams" (Gregg Allman) - 10:15
2. "Statesboro Blues" (Blind Willie McTell) - 8:09
3. "Trouble No More" (McKinley Morganfield a.k.a. Muddy Waters) - 4:13
4. "Dimples" (James Bracken, John Lee Hooker) - 5:00
5. "Every Hungry Woman" (Gregg Allman) - 4:28
6. "I'm Gonna Move to the Outskirts of Town" (William Weldon) - 9:22
7. "Hoochie Coochie Man" (Willie Dixon) - 5:23

=== Disc Two ===
1. "Mountain Jam" (Donovan Leitch, Duane Allman, Gregg Allman, Dickey Betts, Berry Oakley, Butch Trucks, Jai Johnny Johanson) - 44:00

== Personnel ==
- Gregg Allman - vocals, organ
- Duane Allman - guitar, slide guitar, vocals on "Dimples"
- Dickey Betts - guitar
- Berry Oakley - bass, vocals on "Hoochie Coochie Man"
- Butch Trucks - drums, percussion
- Jai Johanny Johanson - drums, percussion

=== Original Concert Set List ===
1. "Dreams"
2. "Statesboro Blues"
3. "Trouble No More"
4. "Dimples"
5. "Every Hungry Woman"
6. "I'm Gonna Move to the Outskirts of Town"
7. "Hoochie Coochie Man"
8. "In Memory of Elizabeth Reed"
9. "Mountain Jam"
