= Idlewild South =

Studio album by The Allman Brothers Band
- Released: September 23, 1970
- Recorded: February–July 1970
- Studio: Capricorn Sound (Macon); Criteria, Atlantic South (Miami); Regent Sound (New York City)
- Genre: Southern rock; electric blues
- Length: 30:47
- Label: Atco, Capricorn
- Producer: Tom Dowd (tracks 1–5, 7); Joel Dorn (track 6)

The Allman Brothers Band chronology
| The Allman Brothers Band (1969) | Idlewild South (1970) | At Fillmore East (1971) |

Singles from Idlewild South
- 1. "Revival (Love Is Everywhere)" Released: November 1970; 2. "Midnight Rider" Released: March 26, 1971

Idlewild South is the second studio album by American rock band the Allman Brothers Band. With the exception of one song, the album was produced by Tom Dowd and was released on September 23, 1970 in the United States, by Atco Records and Capricorn Records. Following the release of their 1969 debut, the Allman Brothers Band toured the United States extensively to promote the album, which had little commercial success. Their performances, however, did create positive word of mouth exposure that extended to more famous musicians, such as Eric Clapton, who invited group leader Duane Allman to contribute to his 1970 album Layla and Other Assorted Love Songs.

As a result of the band's relentless touring schedule, Idlewild South was recorded gradually over a period of five months in various cities, including New York, Miami, and Macon, Georgia, the band's adopted home. Tom Dowd had previously been sought to record the group's debut but had been unavailable. The material presented on Idlewild South was written during this period and tested out on the road at shows. The album's title, derived from busy Idlewild Airport in New York City, comes from the band's nickname for a rustic cabin the band rented out and used for rehearsals, as well as parties. Idlewild South contains two of the band's best-known songs, the ballad "Midnight Rider" (later a solo hit for Gregg Allman, and covered by various artists) and the instrumental "In Memory of Elizabeth Reed", which became one of the band's best-known concert numbers.

The album was released in September 1970, but again failed to achieve significant success. Sales began to grow, however, due to over 300 shows the band put on in 1970, setting the stage for their artistic and commercial breakthrough with 1971's live follow-up double-album, At Fillmore East. Following the band's increased fame in the early 1970s, this album and its self-titled debut, The Allman Brothers Band, were repackaged into the compilation album Beginnings. In 1973, Beginnings was certified gold for sales of 500,000 copies, according to the Recording Industry Association of America.

== Background ==
The Allman Brothers Band formed in March 1969, and began writing music and touring together. By that August, the group had recorded its self-titled debut, The Allman Brothers Band, which was released that November on Capricorn Records, a division of Atlantic Records. The record received a poor commercial response, selling less than 35,000 copies upon initial release. Executives suggested to the band's manager and Capricorn president, Phil Walden, that he relocate the band to New York or Los Angeles to increase their exposure. "They wanted us to act "like a rock band" and we just told them to "fuck themselves," remembered Trucks. For their part, the members of the band remained optimistic, electing to stay in the South. "Everyone told us we'd fall by the wayside down there," said Gregg Allman, but the collaboration between the band and Capricorn Records "transformed Macon from this sleepy little town into a very hip, wild, and crazy place filled with bikers and rockers." In March 1970, Oakley's wife rented a large Victorian home on 2321 Vineville Avenue in Macon, which they dubbed "the Big House".

Idlewild South was the band's first effort with Tom Dowd, known for his work with Cream and John Coltrane. Dowd first heard the band rehearsing while he was visiting Capricorn Sound Studios in Macon, asking their name and remarking to Walden, "Get them the hell out of there and give them to me in the studio. They don't need to rehearse; they're ready to record". Dowd was initially scheduled to work with the band on their debut album but was called away at the last minute. Initially, the band had asked friend and colleague Johnny Sandlin to produce their second album, but as recording inched closer, it became obvious they wanted him to co-produce with Dowd. In one of their first sessions, Sandlin was giving suggestions and acting as a co-producer, though no one had informed Dowd; Sandlin was embarrassed and did not return to the studio.

== Recording and production ==
They had to get on the road to support themselves. They were working 300 days a year. So they would just blow in and do some songs and blow out. That was it — in and out — just like that.

— Producer Tom Dowd

The first recording sessions for Idlewild South took place in mid-February 1970 at the newly built Capricorn Sound Studios in Macon. Subsequently, the band moved to Criteria Studios in Miami in mid-March, where Dowd felt more comfortable producing albums; he viewed the then-new Capricorn studio as still a work-in-progress and unfit to record in.

The band reconvened with Dowd during short breaks from shows. In addition, group leader Duane Allman still received invitations to play as a session musician elsewhere; on the "rare instances when [the band] could return to Macon for a short break", Allman would hit the road for New York, Miami, or Muscle Shoals to contribute to other artists' sessions. On days that the band would be available, manager Walden phoned Dowd to inform him; he would often catch their show and spend the rest of the night in the studio.

The Allman Brothers Band opted to cut most of Idlewild South live, with all of the musicians performing together. On rare occasions, they would go back to overdub sections that were not up to standard. "The idea is that part of the thing of the Allman Brothers is the spontaneity — the elasticity. The parts and tempos vary in a way that only they are sensitive to", said Dowd. Duane often left a song alone for more work and testing out on the road. "They would record maybe five songs. Then they might say, 'I don't think that song was good enough,' or, 'I don't think that song was ready to record' ", remembered Dowd.

Joel Dorn, predominantly a jazz producer for Atlantic, stepped in to produce one song on the album when Dowd was unavailable, "Please Call Home", which was recorded at Regency Sound Studios in New York on July 14, 1970.

After nearly half a year and over three different recording studios, production wrapped up by July 1970.

In late August, Duane was invited to join Eric Clapton and his new group Derek & the Dominos on the recording of their debut album, Layla and Other Assorted Love Songs. Clapton later formally invited Allman to join the group, but he reluctantly declined, expressing loyalty to the members of the Allman Brothers and the musical concept that had birthed the band.

== Composition ==
"Midnight Rider"
"Midnight Rider" came together when Gregg Allman and a roadie broke into the studio late one night to record it.

"Revival" initially took shape as an instrumental, with lyrics as an afterthought. "An instrumental has to be real catchy and when you succeed it's very satisfying because you have transcended words and communicated with emotion," said Betts. The song takes on a decidedly gospel flair midway through, accentuated by "old-fashioned church-like hand clapping." The Gregg Allman-penned "Don't Keep Me Wonderin'" follows, featuring Duane on slide guitar and Oakley's friend Thom Doucette on harmonica. "Midnight Rider" developed quickly and featured lyrics contributed in part by roadie Robert Payne, who threw out a suggestion to Gregg Allman while they were together at their equipment warehouse. Unable to gain a key to the nearby Capricorn Sound Studios, the duo broke in and recorded a quick demo with Twiggs Lyndon on bass and Johanson on congas. Duane eventually laid down acoustic guitar tracks for both "Revival" and "Midnight Rider", as he was quicker to record and more technically savvy due to his session work in Muscle Shoals.

"In Memory of Elizabeth Reed" was inspired by a woman Betts was involved with in Macon, the girlfriend of musician Boz Scaggs. "She was Hispanic and somewhat dark and mysterious—and she really used it to her advantage and played it to the hilt," said Betts. To cloak her identity, the song is named after a headstone Betts saw at the Rose Hill Cemetery, where band members often ventured in their early days to relax and write songs. Considerable legend developed about the song's genesis, much fueled by a put-on interview Duane Allman gave Rolling Stone. The song is Betts' first composition recorded by the band. "Hoochie Coochie Man" was the band's rearrangement of a Muddy Waters tune culled from bassist Berry Oakley and Betts' days performing the number in their earlier band the Second Coming. Featuring Oakley in his only studio vocal, it is nearly twice as fast as Waters' original. "Please Call Home" was cut in New York with jazz producer Joel Dorn in two takes, with Johanson switching from brushes to a mallet on the second, final take. "Leave My Blues at Home" contains hints of funk and an extended fade out of the band's signature twin lead guitars."

== Title ==
The album's title came from a nickname of a rented cabin the band shared, the "Idlewild South"

The album's title came from the band's nickname for a $165-a-month cabin ($1,333.39 in 2024) it rented on a lake outside of Macon early in its days there, the busy comings and goings at which reminded them of New York City's Idlewild Airport.

Scott Boyer spoke on the cabin's history in the 2008 book Skydog: The Duane Allman Story:

It was like a hunting cabin. The back of the house had a porch that was built out over a manmade lake that was maybe five or six acres. It was a cabin made out of old pinewood, and it had been there for a long time. ... The Allman Brothers used it as a rehearsal facility — that and a place to go maybe to consume a little something that wasn't quite legal. There were parties out there."

Idlewild South was the home of rehearsals and parties, and was "where the brotherhood came to pass," according to roadie Kim Payne; "There was a pact made out there around a campfire—all for one and one for all. ... Everybody believed [in the band] 100 percent." According to Linda Oakley, spouse of bassist Oakley, the group held a New Year's Eve party going into 1970 where they joined together in a midnight chorus of "Will the Circle Be Unbroken". "That was a pivotal moment, a testament of love," she said. Much of the material presented on the album originated at the cabin.

== Release and reception ==
Professional ratings
Review scores
| Source | Rating |
|---|---|
| AllMusic | 5/5 stars |
| Christgau's Record Guide | B+ |
| Encyclopedia of Popular Music | 4/5 stars |
| Rolling Stone Album Guide | 4/5 stars |
| The Village Voice | B+ |

Idlewild South was issued by Atco and Capricorn Records on September 23, 1970, less than a year after the band's debut album. It sold only "marginally better, in spite of the band's growing national reputation, and included songs that would become staples of its repertoire—and eventually of rock radio." Jim Hawkins, engineer of the album, remembered that Walden informed him that Idlewild South opened to 50,000 copies in its first week, before settling in at 1,000 per week. While the album did help boost the band's popularity, the Allman Brothers' name really grew in fame due to their live performances. Walden doubted the band's future, worrying whether they would ever catch on, but word of mouth spread due to the band's relentless touring schedule, and crowds got larger.

Rolling Stone's Ed Leimbacher wrote that Idlewild South "augurs well for the Allmans' future," calling it "a big step forward from the Allmans' first" but considered the second side of the LP a disappointment. Robert Christgau at The Village Voice gave the album a "B+" and considered it a companion piece to Duane Allman's work on Layla, noting that "a lot of people think that Duane Allman is already a ranking titan of the electric guitar." A retrospective five-star review from Bruce Eder at Allmusic deemed it "the best studio album in the group's history, electric blues with an acoustic texture, virtuoso lead, slide, and organ playing, and a killer selection of songs."

=== Accolades ===
In 2014 Rolling Stone listed it among the most "groundbreaking" albums, covering its impact on Southern rock: "On their second album, the Allman Brothers transmogrified from mere blues-rockers to an assemblage creating an entirely new kind of Southern music."

| Year | Publication | Country | Rank | List |
|---|---|---|---|---|
| 2014 | Rolling Stone | U.S. | * | The 40 Most Groundbreaking Albums of All Time |

== Track listing ==
All tracks are written by Gregg Allman, except where noted.

Side one
| No. | Title | Writer(s) | Length |
|---|---|---|---|
| 1. | "Revival" | Dickey Betts | 4:04 |
| 2. | "Don't Keep Me Wonderin'" | | 3:40 |
| 3. | "Midnight Rider" | G. Allman, Robert Kim Payne | 3:00 |
| 4. | "In Memory of Elizabeth Reed" | Betts | 6:54 |

Side two
| No. | Title | Writer(s) | Length |
|---|---|---|---|
| 1. | "Hoochie Coochie Man" | Willie Dixon | 4:54 |
| 2. | "Please Call Home" | | 4:00 |
| 3. | "Leave My Blues at Home" | | 4:15 |

Super Deluxe Edition (Disc one)
| No. | Title | Writer(s) | Length |
|---|---|---|---|
| 8. | "Statesboro Blues" (Session Outtake Remix) | Blind Willie McTell | 4:10 |
| 9. | "In Memory of Elizabeth Reed" (Alternate Take) | Betts | 8:20 |
| 10. | "One More Ride" (Session Outtake Remix) | G. Allman; Betts | 3:45 |
| 11. | "Midnight Rider" (Alternate Mix) | G. Allman; Payne | 3:43 |
| 12. | "Revival (Love Is Everywhere)" (Mono Single Version) | Betts | 2:39 |

Super Deluxe Edition (Disc two)
| No. | Title | Writer(s) | Length |
|---|---|---|---|
| 1. | "Dreams" (Live at Ludlow Garage: 1970) | | 10:29 |
| 2. | "Statesboro Blues" (Live at Ludlow Garage: 1970) | McTell | 8:38 |
| 3. | "Trouble No More" (Live at Ludlow Garage: 1970) | McKinley Morganfield | 4:52 |
| 4. | "Dimples" (Live at Ludlow Garage: 1970) | James Bracken; John Lee Hooker | 5:47 |
| 5. | "Every Hungry Woman" (Live at Ludlow Garage: 1970) | | 4:18 |
| 6. | "I'm Gonna Move to the Outskirts of Town" (Live at Ludlow Garage: 1970) | William Weldon | 9:16 |
| 7. | "Hoochie Coochie Man" (Live at Ludlow Garage: 1970) | Dixon | 5:32 |

Super Deluxe Edition (Disc three)
| No. | Title | Writer(s) | Length |
|---|---|---|---|
| 1. | "In Memory of Elizabeth Reed" (Live at Ludlow Garage: 1970) | Betts | 15:04 |
| 2. | "Mountain Jam" (Live at Ludlow Garage: 1970) | Donovan Leitch; Duane Allman; G. Allman; Betts; Berry Oakley; Butch Trucks; Jai Johnny Johanson | 45:12 |

== Personnel ==
All credits adapted from liner notes.

The Allman Brothers Band

- Gregg Allman – vocals, organ, piano
- Duane Allman – slide guitar, lead guitar, acoustic guitar
- Dickey Betts – lead guitar
- Berry Oakley – bass guitar, vocals on "Hoochie Coochie Man", and harmony vocals on "Midnight Rider"
- Jai Johanny Johanson – drums, congas, timbales, percussion
- Butch Trucks – drums, timpani

Additional musicians

- Thom Doucette – harmonica, percussion

Production

- Tom Dowd – production, engineer
- Joel Dorn – producer on "Please Call Home"
- Frank Fenter – supervision
- Bob Liftin – engineer
- Chuck Kirkpatrick – engineer
- Howie Albert – engineer
- Jim Hawkins – engineer
- Ron Albert – engineer
- Jimm Roberts – artwork, photography
- Suha Gur – mastering

== Charts ==
| Chart (1970) | Peak position |
|---|---|
| US Billboard 200 | 38 |
