= Revival (Love Is Everywhere) =

Single by The Allman Brothers Band

from the album Idlewild South
- B-side: "Leave My Blues at Home"
- Released: November 1970
- Genre: Southern rock; blues rock
- Length: 4:05 (album); 2:39 (single)
- Label: Capricorn
- Songwriter(s): Dickey Betts
- Producer(s): Tom Dowd

The Allman Brothers Band singles chronology
"Black Hearted Woman" (1970)	"Revival" (1970)	"Midnight Rider" (1971)

"Revival", sometimes listed as "Revival (Love Is Everywhere)", is a song by the American rock band the Allman Brothers Band. It was the lead single from their second studio album, Idlewild South (1970), released on Capricorn Records. The song was written by guitarist Dickey Betts, his first songwriting credit for the group.

It was the first Allman Brothers song to chart, peaking at number 92 on the Billboard Hot 100 in early 1971.

The song was covered by John Mayall on his 1979's album Bottom Line.

== Background ==
His first songwriting contribution to the band, guitarist Dickey Betts initially wrote "Revival" as an instrumental. He began singing along, and lyrics came as an afterthought, which was not typical. Betts tended to naturally write instrumental songs first; he later commented, "You have to have an altogether different approach; an instrumental has to be real catchy and when you succeed it’s very satisfying because you have transcended words and communicated with emotion." Duane Allman plays the acoustic guitar heard on "Revival", as he was better at obtaining a nice acoustic sound due to his studio experience.

== Chart performance ==
"Revival" was the first Allman Brothers song to chart, when it debuted and peaked at number 92 on the Billboard Hot 100 during the week of January 9, 1971. It stayed at that position for a second week before falling to number 100. It dropped off the listing after that, spending only three weeks in total on the chart. The duration of the song on the album is 4:05, but on the 45 rpm the first 86 seconds were cut off, taking the song to 2:39.

== Charts ==
Chart (1971)	Peak position
US Billboard Hot 100	92

== Notes ==
=== Sources ===
- Paul, Alan (2014). One Way Out: The Inside History of the Allman Brothers Band. St. Martin's Press. ISBN 978-1250040497.
