= In Memory of Elizabeth Reed =

Instrumental by the Allman Brothers Band

from the album Idlewild South (Studio) At Fillmore East (Live)
- Released: September 23, 1970 (Studio); July 1971 (Live)
- Recorded: February–July 1970 (Studio); March 12–March 13, 1971, Fillmore East, New York City (Live)
- Genre: Jazz fusion; instrumental rock; jam rock
- Length: 6:54 (Studio); 13:04 (Live)
- Label: Capricorn Records
- Songwriter: Dickey Betts
- Producer: Tom Dowd

"In Memory of Elizabeth Reed" is an instrumental composition by the American group the Allman Brothers Band. It first appeared on their second studio album, Idlewild South (1970), released on Capricorn Records. The jazz-influenced piece was written by guitarist Dickey Betts, among his first writing credits for the group. Betts named it after a headstone he saw for Elizabeth Jones Reed Napier in Rose Hill Cemetery in the band's hometown of Macon, Georgia. Multiple versions of the composition have been recorded, with the version performed on the group's 1971 live album At Fillmore East generally considered the definitive rendition.

== Overview ==
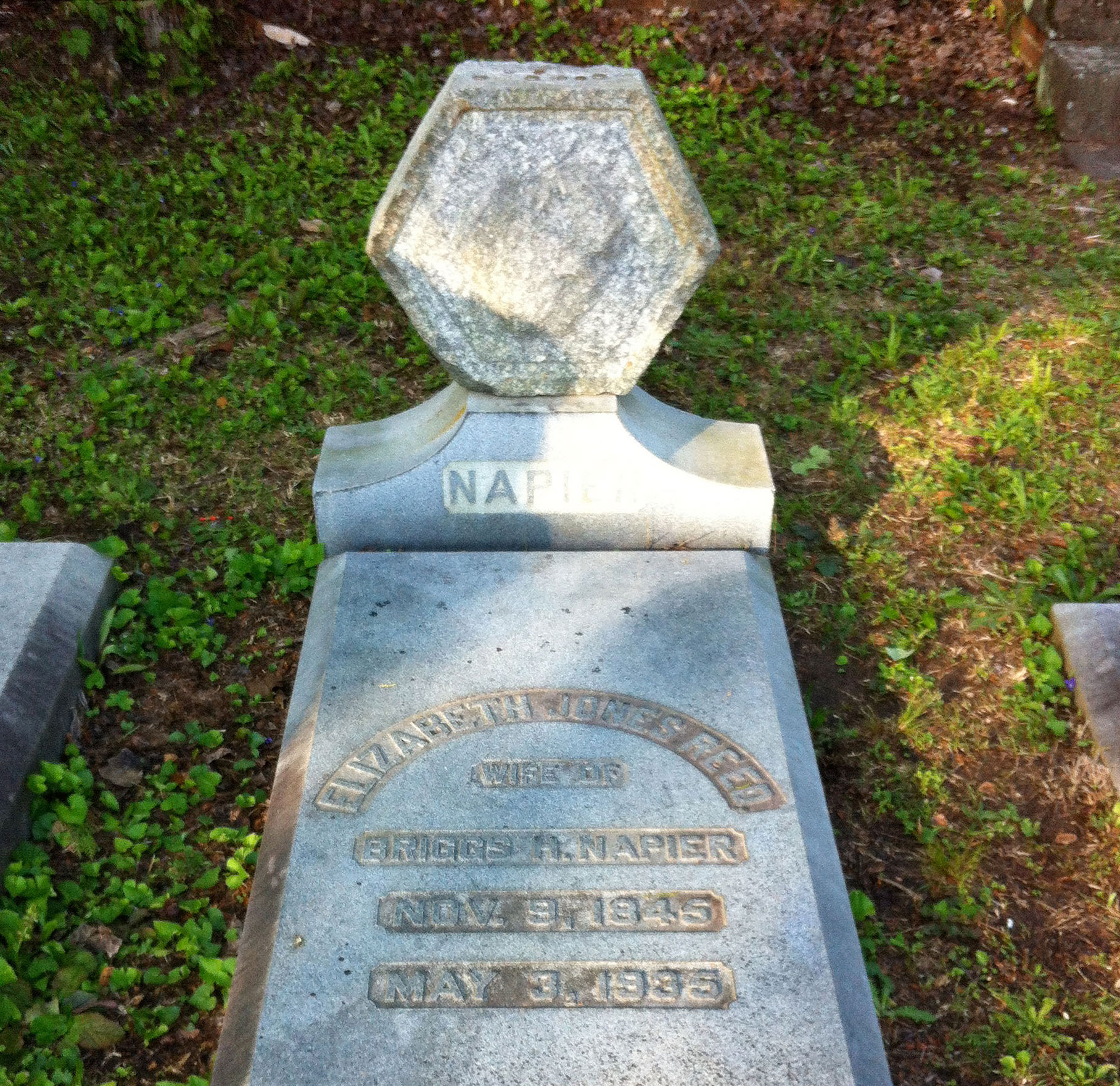
Headstone for Elizabeth Reed at Rose Hill Cemetery

The original studio recording of "In Memory of Elizabeth Reed" is the fourth track on the group's 1970 album Idlewild South. Composed by Dickey Betts, it is the first instrumental written by a band member, and the first of several that Betts would write and become known for. The original Rolling Stone review of Idlewild South said the piece "just goes and goes for a stupendous, and unnoticed, seven minutes."

"In Memory of Elizabeth Reed" was inspired by a woman Betts was involved with in the group's hometown of Macon, Georgia. She was the girlfriend of musician Boz Scaggs, with Betts later saying she "was Hispanic and somewhat dark and mysterious—and she really used it to her advantage and played it to the hilt." To cloak her identity, the composition is named after a headstone Betts saw at the Rose Hill Cemetery, where band members often ventured in their early days to relax and write songs. Considerable legend developed about the piece's genesis and what Betts was doing at the time, much of it fueled by a put-on interview band leader Duane Allman gave Rolling Stone. "Duane told some crazy shit about that graveyard. I don't wanna tell all—but that's the part that matters," Betts later said. For his part, vocalist Gregg Allman was candid about his experiences in the cemetery: "I'd be lying if I said I didn't have my way with a lady or two down there." The cemetery later became the final resting spot of Duane and Gregg Allman, along with bassist Berry Oakley and drummer Butch Trucks.

The Rolling Stone Album Guide called "In Memory of Elizabeth Reed" in its original studio incarnation "the blueprint of a concert warhorse, capturing the Allmans at their most adventurous." The New York Times has written that "its written riffs and jazz-ish harmonies [allow] improvisers room." Accordingly, "Elizabeth Reed" has appeared in many Allman Brothers concerts, sometimes running half an hour or more, and on numerous Allman Brothers live albums, but first and most notably on At Fillmore East, which many fans and critics believe is the definitive rendition. In 2007, Rolling Stone named "In Memory of Elizabeth Reed" one of its Fifty Best Songs Over Seven Minutes Long—and in giving it Honorable Mention on its 100 Greatest Guitar Songs of All Time list made 2008, Rolling Stone called the At Fillmore East performance "transcendent".

== At Fillmore East recording ==
In this performance, taken from the March 13, 1971 (first show) concert by the group, Betts opens the piece with ethereal volume swells on his guitar, giving the aural impression of violins. Slowly the first theme begins to emerge, Duane Allman's guitar joining Betts in a dual lead that variously doubles the melody, provides a harmony line, or provides counterpoint. The tempo then picks up in the next section to a Santana-like, quasi-Latin beat, a strong second-theme melody driven by unison playing and harmonized guitars arising.

Betts next plays a solo using the second theme as a starting-off point. This leads into an organ solo from Gregg Allman, with the two guitars playing rhythm figures in the background. Throughout, percussionists Butch Trucks and Jai Johanny Johanson play in unison, laying what has been described as "a thick bed of ride-snare rhythm for the soloists to luxuriate upon."

Duane Allman then starts quietly rephrasing the first theme, gradually building to a high-pitched climax, Berry Oakley's bass guitar playing a strong counterpoint against the band's trademark percussion. Allman cools into a reverie, then starts again, finding an even more furious peak. Parts of this solo would draw comparison to John Coltrane and his sheets of sound, other parts to Miles Davis' classic Kind of Blue album. Duane Allman biographer Randy Poe wrote that "[Allman]'s playing jazz in a rock context" reflected the emerging jazz fusion movement, only in reverse. Allman himself told writer Robert Palmer at that time, "that kind of playing comes from Miles and Coltrane, and particularly Kind of Blue. I've listened to that album so many times that for the past couple of years, I haven't hardly listened to anything else." Almost two decades later, Palmer would write of the Allmans, "that if the musicians hadn't quite scaled Coltrane-like heights, they had come as close as any rock band was likely to get." Rolling Stone would say in 2002 that the composition's performance found the musicians "lock[ed] together ... with the grace and passion of the tightest jazz musicians," while in 2008, it said the trills, crawls, and sustain of the guitar work represented "the language of jazz charged with electric R&B futurism."

Following the Duane Allman solo the band drops off to a relatively brief but to-the-point percussion break by Trucks and Johanson reflecting Kind of Blue drummer Jimmy Cobb's work. The full band then enters to recap the mid-tempo second theme, finishing the performance abruptly. Several silent beats pass before the Fillmore audience erupts in riotous applause.

== Later editing ==
Some selections on the original 1971 At Fillmore East were edited by producer Tom Dowd for conciseness or other reasons. "In Memory of Elizabeth Reed", however, was not edited on that album, and was a recording of a single performance of the song.

When the 1992 expanded edition The Fillmore Concerts was released, the liner notes stated it was edited on that set:

The clearest example of Tom Dowd's approach to the project comes in the 13 minute version of "In Memory of Elizabeth Reed" that is pieced together from multiple takes, one of them being the March 13th (first show) version that appeared on the original album. The band played the song three times during its Fillmore stand. "One of them I hated," Dowd says, "but two of them were fantastic!" Dowd and mixer Jay Mark mixed down those two versions and proceeded to, as Dowd puts it, "take this song apart. I came to the conclusion that in the first half of the song, up to Duane's solo, I had a better band performance and Dickey Betts solo on the version that we had not used before. Starting with Duane's solo, though, it's the original version. Twenty-one years later, I know 'Liz Reed' as well as I know any song, certainly more than I did in that time of instant decisions. Putting the two versions together showed off the song best. Listen to it! Listen to the togetherness of Dickey, Duane, and Gregg on the theme lines, and how Butch and Jaimoe adjust to the changes up front. There's much more exciting interplay now, more like the band sounded those nights."

In reaction, Bruce Eder's Allmusic review of this album stated: "It is also a slightly less honest release [than the original], where 'In Memory of Elizabeth Reed' is concerned—Dowd edited the version here together from two different performances, first and second shows, the dividing line being where Duane Allman's solo comes in." C. Michael Bailey of All About Jazz also stated that the 1992 The Fillmore Concerts represented "digital editing" combining multiple takes of "Elizabeth Reed" onto one track. Dave Lynch of Allmusic later said that of the 1992 editing, that "Duane's 'Liz Reed' solo, although from the same take used on At Fillmore East, is mixed lower than on the version listeners first heard in 1971—as a result, the power and beauty of the solo doesn't stand out quite as effectively."

An alternate theory, that two tapes of the same performance were edited together for The Fillmore Concerts release, has been posited by rock photographer Kirk West on the Allman Brothers website forum:

the problem with liz reed is this (and i know this to be true because i've spent months in the polygram tape vaults over the years and have handled and listened to all of these things), there is a tape in the vaults that is a "compilation reel", that is the selected versions of several songs and on it is a version of the liz reed from the 13th early set. this tape was included in the shipment of tape from the tape vault to the mixing studio where tom worked. this tape is not clearly marked as a "comp tape" but upon close investigation it proved to be just that back in 91-92. as i said, i had picked all these alt tracks in the winter of 91-92 and was on the road when tom did the mixing. tom did splice the front end of liz reed from one tape to the back end of liz reed from a second tape. unfortunately, it was two tapes of the same performance of liz reed, that of the 13th early show. in the process of remixing these tapes in 92 tom did hear things that he hadn't heard before, he says that exact thing in the liner notes.

In any case, when yet another release, the 2003 At Fillmore East [Deluxe Edition], came out, whatever had been done in 1992 was undone, and "In Memory of Elizabeth Reed" was restored to the 1971 mix and unedited.

== Other live versions ==
A rearranged take on "In Memory of Elizabeth Reed", running seventeen minutes and featuring an electric piano played by Chuck Leavell in place of the Duane Allman guitar parts, appeared on the band's generally unloved 1976 Wipe the Windows, Check the Oil, Dollar Gas double live album. Eder of Allmusic states that the band knew "they could never spark more fire than the version from the Fillmore, so they transform it into a moodier piece with more space for the keyboards to open up."

Concert performances of "In Memory of Elizabeth Reed" that the band has released on live albums (some of which are archival in nature) include those on Fillmore East, February 1970, Live at Ludlow Garage: 1970, Live at the Atlanta International Pop Festival: July 3 & 5, 1970, Fillmore West '71 (three different renditions), Boston Common, 8/17/71, Live from A&R Studios (1971), S.U.N.Y. at Stonybrook: Stonybrook, NY 9/19/71, Nassau Coliseum, Uniondale, NY: 5/1/73, Live at Great Woods (1991), Play All Night: Live at the Beacon Theatre 1992, and An Evening with the Allman Brothers Band: 2nd Set (1992/94), in addition to any number of the group's "Instant Live" recordings.

== Covers ==
Jazz flautist Herbie Mann expressed his admiration for the tune, and recorded it on his 1971 album Push Push, with Duane Allman on guitar, and again on his 1973 album Turtle Bay.

== See also ==
- Instrumental rock
- Musical improvisation
