= Midnight Rider =

1971 single by The Allman Brothers Band

Single by The Allman Brothers Band

from the album Idlewild South
- B-side: "Whipping Post"
- Released: March 26, 1971
- Recorded: 1970
- Genre: Southern rock; blues rock
- Length: 2:57
- Label: Capricorn
- Songwriters: Gregg Allman; Robert Kim Payne (uncredited)
- Producer: Tom Dowd

The Allman Brothers Band singles chronology
"Revival (Love Is Everywhere)" (1970)	"Midnight Rider" (1971)	"Ain't Wastin' Time No More" (1972)

Official Audio
- "Midnight Rider" on YouTube

Audio sample
- file; help

"Midnight Rider" is a song by the American rock band the Allman Brothers Band. It was the second single from their second studio album, Idlewild South (1970), released on Capricorn Records. The song was primarily written by vocalist Gregg Allman, who first began composing it at a rented cabin outside Macon, Georgia. He enlisted the help of roadie Robert Kim Payne to complete the song's lyrics. He and Payne broke into Capricorn Sound Studios to complete a demo of the song.

While the original Allman Brothers release of the song did not chart, "Midnight Rider" was much more successful in cover versions. Gregg Allman's solo version of the song, released in 1973, was its biggest chart success; it was a top 20 hit in the U.S. and Canada. A cover by Jamaican singer Paul Davidson represented its biggest peak in the United Kingdom, where it hit number ten. Country artist Willie Nelson also recorded a version of the song that peaked at number six on U.S. country charts.

== Background ==
"Midnight Rider" originated during the group's time spent at Idlewild South, a $165-a-month farmhouse they rented on a lake outside Macon, Georgia. Allman felt free to smoke marijuana with no police around, which contributed to his writing at the cabin. Its genesis was quick: the song came to him out of nowhere, and he completed a rough draft in just over an hour of writing. He found himself stuck on the song's third verse, which he regarded as an especially important component of the song: "it's kind of the epilogue to the whole thing," he later wrote. In the middle of the night, he went to roadie Kim Payne, who was keeping watch over the band's warehouse, where they kept their equipment. Payne helped him write the first two lines of the third verse: "We were getting high and, honestly, he was starting to irritate me—because he was singing this song over and over and I got sick of hearing the band play the same shit over and over again until they got it right," Payne later recalled. "So I just threw out the line, 'I've gone past the point of caring / some old bed I’ll soon be sharing.'"

Thankful for Payne's help, Allman told him he would give him a percentage of its royalties should it become a success. Payne was not originally listed as a songwriter on the song, so he later had Allman contact Phil Walden to produce a contract that allowed him five percent of its future royalties.

== Recording and production ==
Allman wanted to record it immediately, but had no keys to Capricorn Sound Studios, which was adjacent to the warehouse. They phoned both producer Johnny Sandlin and Paul Hornsby who "told us to go to hell, come back in the morning," according to Payne. Intent on recording the song, Allman and Payne broke into the building, with Payne smashing a window on a door to allow him to unlock it. After managing to turn on the recording console and microphones, Allman recorded a demo by himself on acoustic guitar. Unable to find the band members, he enlisted friend Twiggs Lyndon to perform bass guitar on a rough demo, though Lyndon did not know how to play the instrument. Allman instructed him to play the bassline he had envisioned and Lyndon practiced it multiple times to prepare. He later found Allman Brothers drummer Jaimoe and had him perform congas on the demo. In the final studio recording, Duane Allman plays acoustic guitar, as he had enough studio experience to produce a nice acoustic sound.

Gregg Allman called it "the song I’m most proud of in my career."

== Composition ==
"Midnight Rider" uses traditional folk and blues themes of desperation, determination, and a man on the run:

I've got one more silver dollar
But I'm not gonna let 'em catch me, no
Not gonna let 'em catch
The midnight rider.

The verse's arrangement features Duane Allman's acoustic guitar carrying the song's changes, underpinned by a congas-led rhythm section and soft, swirling organ. Dickey Betts' lead guitar phrases ornament the choruses and the instrumental break, while Gregg Allman's powerful, soulful singing, featuring reverb-laden harmony, has led to the song becoming known by some as Allman's signature piece. Music writer Jean-Charles Costa stated in 1973 that, "'Midnight Rider' has been recorded by other bands and it's easy to see why. The verse construction, the desperate lyrics, and the taut arrangement make it standout material," while musician and writer Bill Janovitz said that the recording successfully blended elements of blues, country music, soul music, and Southern rock.

"Midnight Rider" has been a concert staple for the band in decades since; it is usually played fairly closely to the original template, and was not used as the basis for long jams until the Allman Brothers' annual New York City run in 2010.

== Charted versions ==
The original version of "Midnight Rider" by the Allman Brothers Band never charted, but the song later became a hit for four other artists:

- In November 1972, British rock singer Joe Cocker, who specialized in treating recently written songs by others, released a version on his self-titled album. The single reached #27 on the Billboard Hot 100 and was credited to Joe Cocker with The Chris Stainton Band.
- In fall 1973, Gregg Allman released a re-imagined version of the song on his first solo album, Laid Back, that featured the addition of horns and a solo rather than harmony vocal line. It reached #19 on the Billboard Hot 100 in early 1974.
- In early 1976, a reggae version by the Jamaican singer Paul Davidson on the Tropical Records label reached #10 in the UK Singles Chart.
- In 1980, Willie Nelson recorded a cover of the song for inclusion in the soundtrack to the film The Electric Horseman. Nelson's version was released as a single, and peaked at #6 on the Hot Country Singles chart. Nelson was a dear friend of fellow Austinite Dusty Rhodes and when Rhodes portrayed the masked professional wrestling gimmick "The Midnight Rider", Nelson's version of the song was utilized. Nelson later re-released the song in 2004 as a duet with Toby Keith, although this rendition did not chart.

== Other versions ==
Many other versions have been recorded as well, starting in 1971 with drummer Buddy Miles on his A Message to the People album on Mercury Records. Funk-jazz guitarist Maynard Parker released a 1973 version on an album named after the song. Since that time, the song has gone on to be The Allman Brothers Band's most covered song, performed by artists ranging from country legend Waylon Jennings to punk rock legend Patti Smith; from bluegrass fiddler/singer Alison Krauss to ska revivalists Bad Manners to doo-wop vocalists The Drifters. O.A.R. also covers "Midnight Rider" frequently at live shows, as well as Bon Jovi guitarist Richie Sambora, who sometimes uses it as an intro to "Wanted Dead or Alive" during his solo shows, but also with his main band; he had also sung "Midnight Rider" before the aforementioned song. Buckcherry has also played "Midnight Rider" live, Michael McDonald does a rendition of "Midnight Rider", and it has also appeared on a Hank Williams, Jr. album. Bob Seger covered the song on his long out of print Back in '72 album. An edited and remastered version of his original version, which eliminates the breakdown and Seger's scatting towards the end of the track, appears on his 2009 Early Seger Vol. 1 compilation album. Stephen Stills included the song on his 1978 Thoroughfare Gap album, and later played "Midnight Rider" in 2009 on The Howard Stern Show, saying that he and Gregg Allman used to sing it together. In summer 2010, he and his bandmates in Crosby, Stills and Nash performed the song on their European tour, during a "covers" section in their set.

Gregg Allman's solo version is featured during the opening scenes of the 2004 remake of Walking Tall.

Fury in the Slaughterhouse covered this song on their 2002 album The Color Fury.

Theory of a Deadman covered the song on the 2003 special edition of their 2002 self-titled debut album.

UB40 also covered the song on their 2013 Getting Over the Storm album.

Sharon Jones & the Dap-Kings recorded a soul/funk version in 2016 for Lincoln Motor Company to use in a commercial.

In 2017, Lydia Lunch and Cypress Grove covered the song on their album Under the Covers.

Christian singer Zach Williams covered the song on the 2017 deluxe edition of his album Chain Breaker.

Country Rock Artist Davey T Hamilton covered the song in 2025

== Charts ==
Joe Cocker version

Chart (1972)	Peak position
US Billboard Hot 100	27

Gregg Allman version

Chart (1973–1974)	Peak position
Canada Top Singles (RPM)	17
US Billboard Hot 100	19

Paul Davidson version

Chart (1975–1976)	Peak position
UK Singles (Official Charts)	10

Willie Nelson version

Chart (1980)	Peak position
US Hot Country Singles (Billboard	6

== Notes ==
=== Sources ===
- Paul, Alan (2014). One Way Out: The Inside History of the Allman Brothers Band. St. Martin's Press. ISBN 978-1250040497.
- Freeman, Scott (1996). Midnight Riders: The Story of the Allman Brothers Band. Little, Brown and Company. ISBN 978-0316294522.
- Allman, Gregg; Light, Alan (2012). My Cross to Bear. William Morrow. ISBN 978-0062112033.
