= Whipping Post (song) =

Song by American musical group The Allman Brothers Band

Song by the Allman Brothers Band

from the album The Allman Brothers Band (studio) At Fillmore East (live)
- Released: November 1969 (studio); July 1971 (live)
- Recorded: August 1969 (studio); March 1971 (live)
- Genre: Blues rock; roots rock; Southern rock; Southern Gothic
- Length: 5:17 (studio); 22:40 (live)
- Label: Capricorn Records
- Songwriter: Gregg Allman
- Producers: Adrian Barber (studio); Tom Dowd (live)

"Whipping Post" is a song by the Allman Brothers Band. Written by Gregg Allman, the five-minute studio version first appeared on their 1969 debut album The Allman Brothers Band. The song was regularly played live and was the basis for much longer and more intense performances. This was captured in the Allman Brothers' 1971 double live album At Fillmore East, where a 22-minute, 40-second rendition of the song takes up the entire final side. It was this recording that garnered "Whipping Post" spots on both the Rock and Roll Hall of Fame's 500 Songs that Shaped Rock and Roll list and Rolling Stone's list of "The 500 Greatest Songs of All Time", which wrote, "the song is best appreciated in the twenty-three-minute incarnation on At Fillmore East."

== Composition and studio version ==
Gregg Allman was 21 years old when the song was first recorded. Its writing dates back to late March 1969, when the Allman Brothers Band was first formed. Gregg had failed to make a name for himself as a musician during a late-1960s stint in Los Angeles, and was on the verge of quitting music altogether when his brother Duane Allman called and said his new band needed a vocalist. Gregg showed the band 22 songs he had written, but only "Dreams" and "It's Not My Cross to Bear" were deemed usable. Gregg, the group's only songwriter at the time, was commissioned to create additional songs that would fit into the context of the new band, and in the next five days he wrote several, including "Whipping Post".

Gregg's travails in the music business would provide some of the thematic inspiration for the new song, but Allman has also said he is not sure where the lyrics came from. The song's metrical pattern and lyrics were written quickly on an ironing board cover, by Allman's telling in the middle of the night using the charcoal from extinguished kitchen matches. He later said: "It came so fast. I didn't even have a chance to get the paper out. That's the way the good songs come—they just hit you like a ton of bricks."

The blues rock song's lyrics center on a metaphorical whipping post, an evil woman and futile existential sorrow. Writer Jean-Charles Costa described the studio version's musical structure as a "solid framework of [a] song that lends itself to thousands of possibilities in terms of solo expansion. ... building to a series of shrieking lead guitar statements, and reaching full strength in the chorus supported by super dual-lead guitar." The result was called by Rolling Stone an "enduring anthem ... rife with tormented blues-ballad imagery".

Musically, the composition was immediately noticeable for its use of a time signature in the introduction that has been variously described as 11/4 (by Duane Allman, as related by Gregg Allman, and later by Gregg Allman himself, as well as by Dickey Betts); or 11/8 (by some other music sources); or simply as "a lick in 11" or "elevens" (by band drummer Butch Trucks). As Gregg Allman later said:

I didn't know the intro was in 11/4 time. I just saw it as three sets of three, and then two to jump on the next three sets with: it was like 1,2,3—1,2,3—1,2,3—1,2. I didn't count it as 1,2,3,4,5,6,7,8,9,10,11. It was one beat short, but it didn't feel one short, because to get back to the triad, you had two steps to go up. You'd really hit those two hard, to accent them, so that would separate the threes. ... [Duane] said, "That's good man, I didn't know that you understood 11/4." Of course I said something intelligent like, "What's 11/4?" Duane just said, "Okay, dumbass, I'll try to draw it up on paper for you."

The actual part that played the introduction was devised by bassist Berry Oakley; it gave the song a more menacing feel than the melancholy blues that Allman had originally written.

The time signature for the balance of the song has been variously described as "modified 3/4" (by Jean-Charles Costa) or as 12/8 (by some other music sources).

The original "Whipping Post" was recorded for The Allman Brothers Band album on August 7, 1969, at Atlantic Recording Studios in New York City. Adrian Barber was the producer, and the band spent the entire full-day session getting the song's performance to their liking. The album was released on November 4, 1969, but sold poorly, barely reaching the bottom rungs of the U.S. albums chart. "Whipping Post" was placed last on the album's running order, in what writer Randy Poe described as "the classic tradition of leaving the listener wanting more".

== At Fillmore East version ==
None of this fully anticipates the At Fillmore East performance, which bears little resemblance to the studio original. It was recorded at New York's famous Fillmore East venue during the band's second show there on March 13, 1971. Duane Allman begins to tell the audience about the next tune – "We got a little number from our first album we're going to do for you. Berry starts her off" – then two fans yell out "Whipping Post!" Duane responds, "You guessed it," and as stated, Berry Oakley begins the song with the rumbling elevens-based time bass guitar opening, which Rolling Stone would say gave the song its "haunting momentum" and which would become one of the most familiar bass patterns in all of rock.

The introduction develops with Duane and then Dickey Betts' dual lead guitars entering, before Gregg Allman's Hammond organ joins as well. Gregg's delivery of the vocal is transformed compared to the original, and culminates in the chorus where he places emphasis on a particular word: "Like I've been tied to the whipping post". The vocal parts are spread throughout the 22 minutes, separated by lengthy instrumental segments. The rhythms underneath the guitar solos start slow and then build up in complexity and volume until their climaxes. The guitarists take turns with their solos, Duane first, Betts second, with the other playing rhythm guitar parts.

But instead of staying in the expected form of the song and returning to the vocals, at the ten-minute point the band takes an unexpected turn. The dynamics are reduced to almost complete quiet and the tempo slows down and then almost disappears into an abstract, rhythmless, free time segment. The next minutes are largely occupied by Betts playing some light jazz styled lines against Oakley's bass line, with Duane Allman supplying moody chords in counterpoint along with the occasional organ wash from Gregg Allman. Between them the guitarists play a half dozen or so melodies and lullabies, including familiar ones such as "Frère Jacques", interspersed with classical music motifs, psychedelic blues riffs, and bell sounds. Poe writes that this section is a "leap into the unknown ... it feels as though everything could simply fall apart at any second, but Dickey continually pulls things back together at what ... seems to be the last possible moment". Timpani, played by Butch Trucks, has a prominent role at several points in the latter stages of the performance. At 21 minutes in, Gregg Allman comes back for the fourth and last vocal segment, before Duane then leads the band to the finish.

But even as the sound lingers and the audience bursts into applause, the music doesn't stop; the tympani keeps going and within seconds, the guitarists start up the mellow lead line to "Mountain Jam" as the record fades into the end grooves. Listeners would not hear that 33-minute continuation until the group's next album, Eat a Peach, was released in 1972.

== Impact ==
Despite its length (or perhaps due to it), the live rendition of "Whipping Post" received considerable progressive rock radio airplay during the early 1970s, especially late at night or on weekends. Such airplay led to "Whipping Post" becoming one of the band's more familiar and popular songs, and would help give At Fillmore East its reputation as having, as The Rolling Stone Record Guide wrote in 1979, "no wasted notes, no pointless jams, no half-realized vocals—everything counts", and of being, as Rolling Stone wrote in 2002, "the finest live rock performance ever committed to vinyl." VH1 would say that "Whipping Post" was "what the band would become famous for, an endless climb of heightening drama staked out by the twin-guitar exorcisms of Duane and Dickey Betts and the cool, measured, almost jazz-like response of the rhythm section." The musical reference book 1001 Albums You Must Hear Before You Die wrote that the "side-long version of 'Whipping Post' brings the house down" and that it is a "Southern gothic lament" that is "[s]immering with a tension that is almost cinematic".

The song also acquired a quasi-legendary role in early 1970s rock concerts, when audience members at other artists' concerts would semi-jokingly yell out "Whipping Post!" as a request between numbers, echoing the fan captured on At Fillmore East. Jackson Browne took note of this occurring during his concerts of the time. Another such instance from 1974 in Helsinki affected rock guitarist and composer Frank Zappa, as described below. Later this same yell-out-at-a-concert "role" would be taken over to a far greater extent by Lynyrd Skynyrd's "Free Bird", although the "Whipping Post" tradition made something of a later comeback at indie rock shows.

With the advent of album oriented rock radio formats in the 1980s and later, "Whipping Post" became less visible in the rock consciousness, but upon the reformation of the Allmans in 1989 and their perennial touring it held a regular slot in the group's concert set list rotation. Musicians continued to study it: Hal Leonard Corporation published a multi-volume sheet music book of the Allman Brothers' work in 1995, and it took 42 pages to transcribe all the guitar solos in the At Fillmore East rendition of the song. "Whipping Post" has also made an impression on writers and been frequently referred to in literature. Ron Rash's 2006 novel The World Made Straight features a character listening to the opening bass line of the song at so loud and close a volume that the speakers shake. Douglas Palermo's 2004 Learning to Live imagines future aliens exploring a desolate Earth and discovering the At Fillmore East recording; the aliens study it and eventually succumb to an overdose of emotion, Tim McCleaf's 2004 novella For They Know Not What They Do uses the song as a metaphor for suffering, while Mary Kay Andrews' novel Little Bitty Lies refers to the song as an example of "soul-scorching blues". In non-fiction, John C. Leggett and Suzanne Malm's 1995 work The Eighteen Stages of Love uses "Whipping Post" as a metaphor for a romantic relationship in which the participants masochistically stay in though it has gone bad. In comedic context, the song was featured in the 2008 My Name Is Earl television series episode "Joy in a Bubble", in which Joy gets sick and Earl has to perform all of her regular duties. The Fillmore recording appears in 2018 movie A Star is Born.

== Other Allmans versions ==
Live versions of "Whipping Post" surfaced on other, later Allman Brothers Band albums, although none approached At Fillmore East in sales, airplay, or influence. The Allmans closed Fillmore East on June 27, 1971, with a concert broadcast over many radio stations; that rendition of the song was incorporated in 2006 into a Deluxe Edition extra CD of the Eat a Peach album, although the Allmans' into-the-early morning performance the night before, which also included "Whipping Post", is considered more memorable. Earlier 1970 renditions of "Whipping Post" have subsequently been released, such as an 8-minute run on Fillmore East, February 1970 and a 14-minute effort on Live at the Atlanta International Pop Festival: July 3 & 5, 1970. Some additional website-only Allmans archival releases, such as Boston Common, 8/17/71, also capture "Whipping Post" takes from the original band.

The archival release Macon City Auditorium: 2/11/72 features a "Whipping Post" from the five-man-band period following Duane Allman's death. Keyboardist Chuck Leavell was then added to the band, and for a very brief period in late 1972 was present while Berry Oakley was still on bass. A November 2, 1972, performance of "Whipping Post" from Hofstra University featured this lineup (nine days before Oakley's death) and was later shown on the national late-night ABC In Concert show, introducing television audiences to both the band and song for the first time. Briefer than usual, and with Leavell taking an electric piano solo in the first slot, Betts still led the band through some of the tempo changes and emotional currents of the song. At the end, Gregg Allman changed the lyric to "... That I feel, that there just ain't no such thing as dying."

After the Allmans broke up and re-formed in 1989, "Whipping Post" was carried forward by various personnel configurations. A 2003 Beacon Theatre performance showed up the following year on the live album One Way Out, and features the Warren Haynes/Derek Trucks era of the band. In his later years, Gregg Allman noted that the more intense parts of the vocal were becoming harder for him to sing.

Gregg Allman himself performed "Whipping Post" with his outside-the-Allmans Gregg Allman and Friends group's concerts, but in a style that he described as "its funky, real rhythm n’ blues-like" and in which he played guitar rather than organ. Allman re-recorded the song for his 1997 album Searching for Simplicity, giving the song a jazzier groove, but rendering it in straight 4/4 time instead of the complex triple time of the original composition.

== Other artists ==
In a 1974 concert in Helsinki, Finland, an audience member disrupted a Frank Zappa performance by shouting a request for "Whipping Post". Zappa responded by playing a version of his song "Montana", where he altered the lyrics with references to whipping posts. (This incident was eventually released on his You Can't Do That on Stage Anymore, Vol. 2 live album in 1988.) In 1981, Zappa's band learned "Whipping Post" and added it to their repertoire, since the band's new singer and keyboard player Bobby Martin knew the song and sang the lead vocals on it. Zappa released a version of the song on the 1984 album Them or Us; a live recording of the song featuring Frank's son Dweezil Zappa on lead guitar was released in 1986 on the Does Humor Belong in Music? album, while a different version appeared in the associated video. Zappa also included a live solo from this song on Guitar with the title "For Duane". In the released versions, Martin also used the closing line "there just ain't no such thing as dyin'" that Allman had sung on ABC In Concert.

Rock cult figure Genya Ravan produced the best-known recording by a female singer, with a screaming take on her 1974 album Goldie Zelkowitz, which was subsequently sampled in Jay-Z's "Oh My God" from his 2006 album Kingdom Come. Portions of the Jay-Z sample appeared as the soundtrack for feature advertisements for the 2013 film Gangster Squad.

Another rendition of "Whipping Post" by another artist came in 2005, during American Idol's fourth season when it was performed by contestant Bo Bice, whose effort on it pleased Randy Jackson, a fan of Southern rock, and the other show judges. Bice eventually finished in second place, with his performance of "Whipping Post" and his stage presence credited for gaining him voting support amongst viewers.

== Usage in media ==
- In 2024, the studio version of the song appeared in the ninth episode of the fifth season of the black-comedy/crime-drama anthology series Fargo, titled "The Useless Hand".

== See also ==
- Musical improvisation
- 20th Century Masters – The Millennium Collection: The Best of the Allman Brothers Band
