= Trouble No More: 50th Anniversary Collection =

Compilation album by The Allman Brothers Band
- Released: February 28, 2020
- Recorded: 1969–2014
- Genres: Southern rock, blues rock
- Length: 395:48
- Label: Mercury
- Producers: Bill Levenson; John Lynskey; Kirk West

The Allman Brothers Band chronology
Fillmore West '71 (2019)	Trouble No More: 50th Anniversary Collection (2020)	The Final Note (2020)

Trouble No More: 50th Anniversary Collection is a compilation album by the Allman Brothers Band. A retrospective of their entire career, it includes both studio and live tracks, and was recorded from 1969 to 2014. Comprising five CDs or ten LPs, and packaged as a box set, it was released on February 28, 2020.

The recordings on Trouble No More are arranged in chronological order. All the performances are by the Allman Brothers Band itself, with all of the 13 different band lineups represented; no material is included from the members' solo projects or their pre-ABB work. The album contains 61 tracks, of which seven were previously unreleased. It also includes an illustrated booklet recounting the band's history.

== Critical reception ==
In Goldmine Ray Chelstowski, wrote "For their 50th anniversary, the Allman Brothers have decided to pull out all of the stops. No stranger to celebrating milestones, the ABB continues to present awe-inspiring collections that marry never heard before material with classics. Moreover, their eye toward building a proper package to house this music has always been razor sharp. In turn with this outing, the extras complement the music in first-rate fashion."

In AllMusic Thom Jurek said, "[Trouble No More] convincingly formulates the argument that no other American band accomplished more musically (especially live) by seamlessly marrying rock, blues, jazz, and R&B to each other and to extended improvisation.... Sequenced chronologically, the music and its accompanying visuals offer a detailed, rounded portrait of this legendary band at their best in all incarnations."

On jambands.com Larson Sutton said, "Why Trouble No More is essential to those beyond the completist is that, including the neatly inclusive historical essay by the group's chief archivist John Lynskey, it's more than just a bounty of great songs in one place. This is the goalpost-to-goalpost story of their five decades together – never overwhelming nor too finite – for a sum experience unparalleled in telling their tale."

In Glide Magazine Doug Collette wrote, "Trouble No More is targeted at a demographic less rather than more familiar with the Allman Brothers, music lovers more curious than knowledgeable about its evolution. Yet even as this 50th Anniversary Collection may have only limited appeal to long-time fans, the brilliance of so much of what’s inside is indisputable." In All About Jazz he wrote, "Thanks no doubt to the mastering expertise of engineer Jason NeSmith, the impeccable audio quality of 50th Anniversary Collection lends a continuity.... In fact, at its best, the audio is as penetrating as the musicianship here..."

== Track listing ==
The track listing for the CD edition of Trouble No More is:

Disc 1: The Capricorn Years 1969–1979 Part I
No.	Title	Writer(s)	Original release	Length
1.	"Trouble No More"	McKinley Morganfield	previously unreleased demo, April 1969	3:33
2.	"Don't Want You No More"	Spencer Davis, Edward Hardin	The Allman Brothers Band (1969)	2:25
3.	"It's Not My Cross to Bear"	Gregg Allman	The Allman Brothers Band	5:04
4.	"Dreams"	G. Allman	The Allman Brothers Band	7:22
5.	"Whipping Post"	G. Allman	The Allman Brothers Band	5:20
6.	"I'm Gonna Move to the Outskirts of Town" (live, 4/11/1970 at Ludlow Garage, Cincinnati, OH)	William Weldon, Roy Jordan	Live at Ludlow Garage: 1970 (1990)	9:18
7.	"Midnight Rider"	G. Allman, Robert Kim Payne	Idlewild South (1970)	3:00
8.	"Revival"	Dickey Betts	Idlewild South	4:07
9.	"Don't Keep Me Wonderin'"	G. Allman	Idlewild South	3:33
10.	"Hoochie Coochie Man"	Willie Dixon	Idlewild South	4:59
11.	"Please Call Home"	G. Allman	Idlewild South	4:03
12.	"Statesboro Blues" (live, 3/13/1971 at Fillmore East, New York, NY)	Will McTell	At Fillmore East (1971)	4:21
13.	"Stormy Monday" (live, 3/13/1971 at Fillmore East, New York, NY)	T-Bone Walker	At Fillmore East	8:52
14.	"In Memory of Elizabeth Reed" (live, 3/13/1971 at Fillmore East, New York, NY)	Betts	At Fillmore East	13:06

Disc 2: The Capricorn Years 1969–1979 Part II
No.	Title	Writer(s)	Original release	Length
1.	"One Way Out" (live, 6/27/1971 at Fillmore East, New York, NY)	Marshall Sehorn, Elmore James	Eat a Peach (1972)	4:58
2.	"You Don't Love Me" / "Soul Serenade" (live, 8/26/1971 at A&R Studios, New York, NY)	Willie Cobbs / Curtis Ousley, Luther Dixon	Dreams (1989)	19:26
3.	"Hot 'Lanta" (live, 8/26/1971 at A&R Studios, New York, NY)	G. Allman, Duane Allman, Betts, Butch Trucks, Berry Oakley, Jai Johanny Johanson	Live from A&R Studios (2016)	6:09
4.	"Stand Back"	G. Allman, Oakley	Eat a Peach	3:26
5.	"Melissa"	G. Allman, Stephen Alaimo	Eat a Peach	3:55
6.	"Blue Sky"	Betts	Eat a Peach	5:11
7.	"Ain't Wastin' Time No More" (live, 4/2/1972 at Mar Y Sol Festival, Vega Baja, Puerto Rico)	G. Allman	Mar y Sol: The First International Puerto Rico Pop Festival (1972)	4:46
8.	"Wasted Words"	G. Allman	Brothers and Sisters (1973)	4:21
9.	"Ramblin' Man"	Betts	Brothers and Sisters	4:48
10.	"Southbound"	Betts	Brothers and Sisters	5:11
11.	"Jessica"	Betts	Brothers and Sisters	7:29
12.	"Early Morning Blues"	G. Allman	Brothers and Sisters, Deluxe Edition (2013)	9:26

Disc 3: The Capricorn Years 1969–1979 Part III / The Arista Years 1980–1981
No.	Title	Writer(s)	Original release	Length
1.	"Come and Go Blues" (live, 7/28/1973 at Summer Jam at Watkins Glen, NY)	G. Allman	Wipe the Windows, Check the Oil, Dollar Gas (1976)	5:02
2.	"Mountain Jam" (live, 7/28/1973 at Summer Jam at Watkins Glen, NY)	Donovan Leitch, G. Allman, D. Allman, Betts, Johanson, Oakley, Trucks	previously unreleased live recording	12:19
3.	"Can't Lose What You Never Had"	Morganfield	Win, Lose or Draw (1975)	5:51
4.	"Win, Lose or Draw"	G. Allman	Win, Lose or Draw	4:46
5.	"High Falls"	Betts	Win, Lose or Draw	14:28
6.	"Crazy Love"	Betts	Enlightened Rogues (1979)	3:44
7.	"Can't Take It With You"	Betts, Don Johnson	Enlightened Rogues	3:35
8.	"Pegasus"	Betts	Enlightened Rogues	7:33
9.	"Just Ain't Easy" (live, 7/19/1979 at Merriweather Post Pavilion, Columbia, MD)	G. Allman	Dreams	5:04
10.	"Hell & High Water"	Betts	Reach for the Sky (1980)	3:37
11.	"Angeline"	Betts, Johnny Cobb, Mike Lawler	Reach for the Sky	3:44
12.	"Leavin'"	G. Allman	Brothers of the Road (1981)	3:46
13.	"Never Knew How Much (I Needed You)"	G. Allman	Brothers of the Road	4:28

Disc 4: The Epic Years 1990–2000
No.	Title	Writer(s)	Original release	Length
1.	"Good Clean Fun"	Betts, Johnny Neel, G. Allman	Seven Turns (1990)	5:09
2.	"Seven Turns"	Betts	Seven Turns	5:07
3.	"Gambler's Roll"	Warren Haynes, Neel	Seven Turns	6:46
4.	"End of the Line"	G. Allman, Haynes, Allen Woody, John Jaworowicz	Shades of Two Worlds (1991)	4:40
5.	"Nobody Knows"	Betts	Shades of Two Worlds	10:59
6.	"Low Down Dirty Mean" (live, 3/10–11/1992 at Beacon Theatre, New York, NY)	Betts, Neel	Play All Night: Live at the Beacon Theatre 1992 (2014)	7:23
7.	"Come On into My Kitchen" (live, 6/11/1992 Radio & Records Convention, Los Angeles, CA)	Robert Johnson, arranged by Betts	Club R&R and Epic Records Present an Acoustic Evening with the Allman Brothers Band (1992)	5:07
8.	"Sailin' 'Cross the Devil's Sea"	G. Allman, Haynes, Woody, Jack Pearson	Where It All Begins (1994)	4:57
9.	"Back Where It All Begins"	Betts	Where It All Begins	9:10
10.	"Soulshine"	Haynes	Where It All Begins	6:44
11.	"No One to Run With"	Betts, John Prestia	Where It All Begins	6:00
12.	"I'm Not Crying" (live, 3/13/1999 at Beacon Theatre, New York, NY)	Pearson, William Howse	previously unreleased live recording	7:44

Disc 5: The Peach Years 2000–2014
No.	Title	Writer(s)	Original release	Length
1.	"Loan Me a Dime" (live, 8/26/2000 at World Music Theatre, Tinley Park, IL)	Fenton Robinson	previously unreleased live recording	10:05
2.	"Desdemona" (live, 3/25/2001 at Beacon Theatre, New York, NY)	G. Allman, Haynes	previously unreleased live recording	13:10
3.	"High Cost of Low Living"	G. Allman, Haynes, Jeff Anders, Ronnie Burgin	Hittin' the Note (2003)	7:51
4.	"Old Before My Time"	G. Allman, Haynes	Hittin' the Note	5:22
5.	"Blue Sky" (live, 3/21/2005 at Beacon Theatre, New York, NY)	Betts	previously unreleased live recording	12:04
6.	"Little Martha" (live, 3/21/2005 at Beacon Theatre, New York, NY)	D. Allman	previously unreleased live recording	2:15
7.	"Black-Hearted Woman" (live, 3/26/2009 at Beacon Theatre, New York, NY)	G. Allman	March 26, 2009 Beacon Theatre tour CD	11:58
8.	"The Sky Is Crying" (live, 10/28/2014 at Beacon Theatre, New York, NY)	James	October 28, 2014 Beacon Theatre tour CD	9:19
9.	"Farewell speeches" (live, 10/28/2014 at Beacon Theatre, New York, NY)	—	October 28, 2014 Beacon Theatre tour CD	3:22
10.	"Trouble No More" (live, 10/28/2014 at Beacon Theatre, New York, NY)	Morganfield	October 28, 2014 Beacon Theatre tour CD	4:18

== Personnel ==
The Allman Brothers Band

- Duane Allman – guitar
- Gregg Allman – organ, piano, guitar, vocals
- Dickey Betts – guitar, vocals
- Berry Oakley – bass
- Butch Trucks – drums
- Jaimoe – drums
- Chuck Leavell – keyboards, vocals
- Lamar Williams – bass
- Dan Toler – guitar
- David "Rook" Goldflies – bass
- David "Frankie" Toler – drums
- Mike Lawler – keyboards
- Warren Haynes – guitar, vocals
- Allen Woody – bass, vocals
- Johnny Neel – keyboards
- Marc Quiñones – congas, percussion, vocals
- Jack Pearson – guitar
- Oteil Burbridge – bass
- Derek Trucks – guitar
- Jimmy Herring – guitar

Additional musicians

- Tom Doucette – harmonica, percussion on Idlewild South, At Fillmore East
- Les Dudek – guitar on "Ramblin' Man", "Jessica"
- Jerry Garcia – guitar on "Mountain Jam"
- Bob Weir – guitar on "Mountain Jam"
- Robbie Robertson – guitar on "Mountain Jam"
- Johnny Sandlin – guitar, percussion on Win, Lose or Draw
- Bill Stewart – percussion on Win, Lose or Draw
- Bonnie Bramlett – vocals on Enlightened Rogues
- Joe Lala – percussion on Enlightened Rogues
- Jim Essery – harmonica on Enlightened Rogues, Reach for the Sky
- Johnny Cobb – piano, vocals on Reach for the Sky
- Thomas Caine – vocals on "Hell & High Water"
- Jimmy Hall – saxophone on "Never Knew How Much (I Needed You)"

Production

- Produced by Bill Levenson, John Lynskey, Kirk West
- Executive producer: Bert Holman
- Mastering: Jason NeSmith
- Essay: John Lynskey
- Art direction: Vartan
- Design: Josh Graham
