= The Essential Allman Brothers Band: The Epic Years =

Greatest hits album by The Allman Brothers Band
- Released: August 31, 2004
- Recorded: 1990–2000
- Genre: Southern rock
- Length: 78:00
- Label: Epic
- Producer: Various

The Allman Brothers Band chronology
Stand Back: The Anthology (2004)	The Essential Allman Brothers Band: The Epic Years (2004)	Macon City Auditorium: 2/11/72 (2004)

Professional ratings
Review scores
Source	Rating
Allmusic	2.5/5 stars
PopMatters	(not rated)

The Essential Allman Brothers Band: The Epic Years is a greatest hits album by the Allman Brothers Band, released in 2004. The album was released by their former label, Epic Records, as part of Sony BMG's The Essential series. It features songs created by the band during their time with Epic Records, spanning from their 1989 reformation until their departure from the label in 2003. Sony Music Entertainment, which now owns the band's releases on Arista Records, and also manages this collection.

== Track listing ==
1. "Good Clean Fun" (Gregg Allman, Dickey Betts, Johnny Neel) – 5:08
2. "Seven Turns" (Dickey Betts) – 5:05
3. "End of the Line" (Gregg Allman, Warren Haynes, Allen Woody, John Jaworowicz) – 4:39
4. "Nobody Knows" (Dickey Betts) – 10:59
5. "Get on With Your Life" (Gregg Allman) – 6:58
6. "No One to Run With" (Dickey Betts, John Prestia) – 5:59
7. "Soulshine" (Warren Haynes) – 6:44
8. "Blue Sky" (Live) (Dickey Betts) – 8:40
9. "Midnight Rider" (Live) (Gregg Allman, Robert Payne) – 3:10
10. "Jessica" (Live) (Dickey Betts) – 16:07
11. "Please Call Home" (Live) (Gregg Allman) – 4:30
- Tracks 1–2 from Seven Turns (1990)
- Tracks 3–5 from Shades of Two Worlds (1991)
- Tracks 6–7 from Where It All Begins (1994)
- Track 8 from An Evening with the Allman Brothers Band: First Set (1992)
- Track 9 from Mycology: An Anthology (1998)
- Track 10 from An Evening with the Allman Brothers Band: 2nd Set (1995)
- Track 11 from Peakin' at the Beacon (2000)

=== Live Songs ===
- Track 8 recorded in 1991
- Track 9 recorded 6/11/1992 at the R&R Club in Los Angeles, CA
- Track 10 recorded 7/1/1994 at the Walnut Creek Amphitheatre in Raleigh, NC
- Track 11 recorded 3/2000 at the Beacon Theatre in New York, NY

== Personnel ==
- Gregg Allman – keyboards, guitar, lead and background vocals
- Dickey Betts – guitar, lead and background vocals
- Butch Trucks – drums, percussion (Tracks 1–8, 10–11)
- Jai Johanny Johanson – drums, percussion (Tracks 1–8, 11)
- Warren Haynes – guitar, background vocals (Tracks 1–10)
- Allen Woody – bass, background vocals (Tracks 1–10)
- Johnny Neel – keyboards, background vocals (Tracks 1–2)
- Marc Quiñones – percussion, background vocals (Tracks 3–8, 10–11)
- Paul T. Riddle – drums (Track 10)
- Derek Trucks – guitar (Track 11)
- Oteil Burbridge – bass (Track 11)
