= Duane Allman discography =

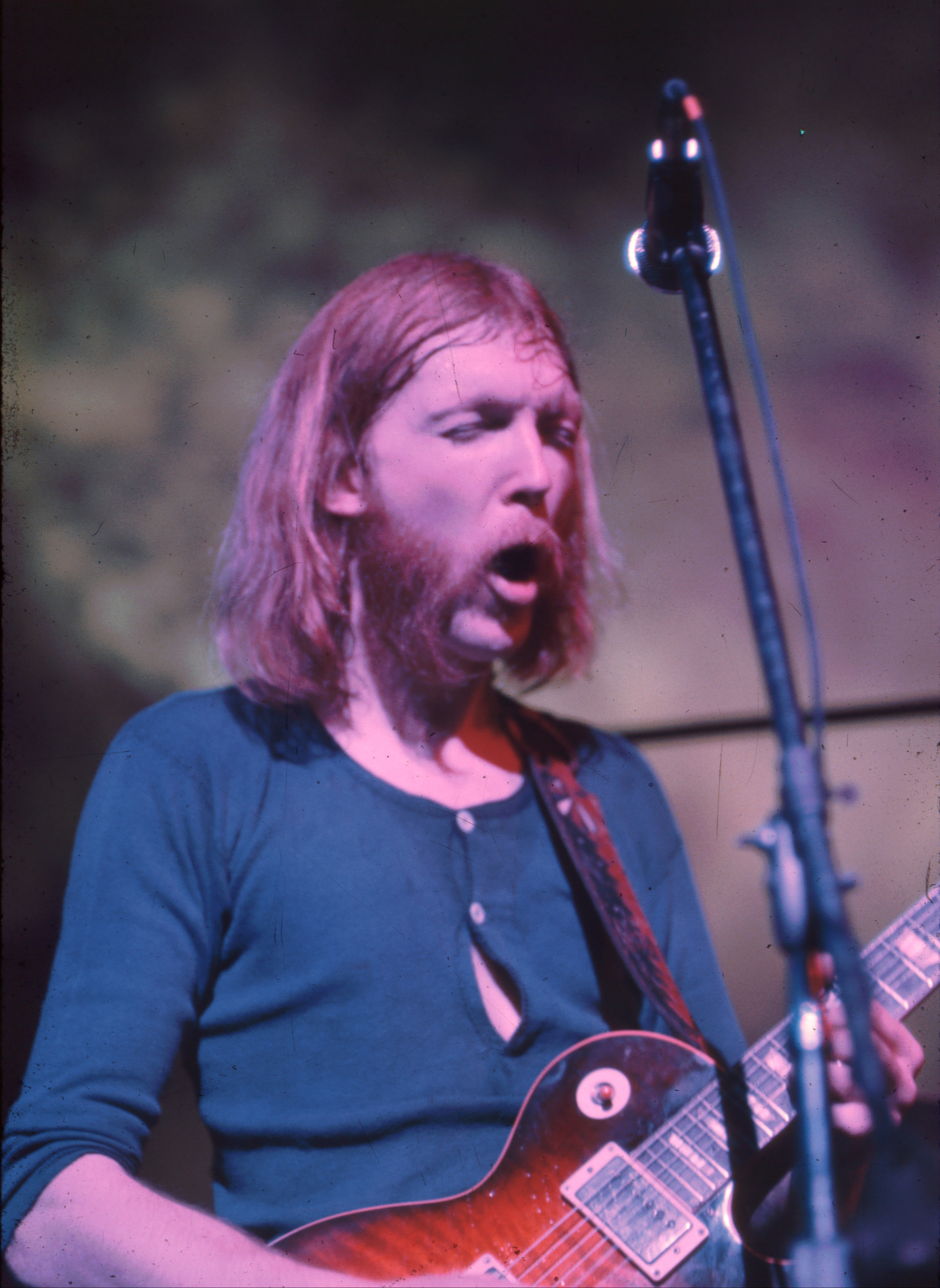
Duane Allman performing with the Allman Brothers Band on June 6, 1971

Duane Allman was an American guitarist. He is best known as a member of the Allman Brothers Band. He was also a member of the bands Hour Glass, the Allman Joys, and Derek and the Dominos. Additionally he worked as a session musician, contributing to the albums of other musical artists.

Album	Artist	Released	Type of album	Notes	Certification
Hour Glass	Hour Glass	October 1967	studio		
Power of Love	Hour Glass	March 1968	studio		
Hey Jude	Wilson Pickett	February 1969	studio		
Instant Groove	King Curtis	May 1969	studio		
The Dynamic Clarence Carter	Clarence Carter	June 1969	studio		
Boz Scaggs	Boz Scaggs	August 19, 1969	studio		
Mourning in the Morning	Otis Rush	August 1969	studio		
The Allman Brothers Band	The Allman Brothers Band	November 4, 1969	studio		
More Sweet Soul	Arthur Conley	1969	studio		
Two Jews Blues	Barry Goldberg and Mike Bloomfield	1969	studio	Allman plays on one track, "Twice a Man"	
Southern Fried	John Hammond	1969	studio		
This Girl's in Love with You	Aretha Franklin	January 15, 1970	studio		
New Routes	Lulu	January 16, 1970	studio		
Ton-Ton Macoute!	Johnny Jenkins	April 1970	studio		
Spirit in the Dark	Aretha Franklin	August 24, 1970	studio		
Idlewild South	The Allman Brothers Band	September 23, 1970	studio		
To Bonnie from Delaney	Delaney & Bonnie	September 1970	studio		
Layla and Other Assorted Love Songs	Derek and the Dominos	November 9, 1970	studio	Allman plays on 11 of the 14 tracks	
Christmas and the Beads of Sweat	Laura Nyro	November 25, 1970	studio		
Ronnie Hawkins	Ronnie Hawkins	February 1970	studio		
The Hawk	Ronnie Hawkins	February 1971	studio		
Motel Shot	Delaney & Bonnie	March 1971	studio		
Sam, Hard and Heavy	Sam Samudio	March 1971	studio		
Push Push	Herbie Mann	July 1, 1971	studio		
At Fillmore East	The Allman Brothers Band	July 6, 1971	live		US: Platinum
5'll Getcha Ten	Cowboy	October 1971	studio	Allman plays dobro on "Please Be with Me" and electric guitar on "Lookin' for You"	
Eat a Peach	The Allman Brothers Band	February 12, 1972	part studio and part live	Duane plays on three of the six studio tracks and on all three live tracks	US: Platinum
Duane & Greg Allman	Duane Allman and Gregg Allman	May 1972	studio	1968 recording of Duane and Gregg with the 31st of February	
An Anthology	Duane Allman	November 1972	compilation	Tracks recorded as a session musician and as a band member	US: Gold
D&B Together	Delaney & Bonnie	1972	studio		
Beginnings	The Allman Brothers Band	1973	compilation	Reissue of The Allman Brothers Band and Idlewild South	US: Gold
Early Allman	The Allman Joys	1973	studio	Recorded in 1966	
The Hour Glass	Hour Glass	1973	compilation	Reissue of Hour Glass and Power of Love	
An Anthology Vol. II	Duane Allman	August 1974	compilation	Tracks recorded as a session musician and as a band member	
The Road Goes On Forever	The Allman Brothers Band	1975	compilation	Tracks from the first five Allman Brothers Band albums	
The Best of Duane Allman	Duane Allman	1979	compilation	Selections from An Anthology and An Anthology Volume II	
The Best of the Allman Brothers Band	The Allman Brothers Band	1981	compilation	Selections from Allman Brothers Band albums, 1969–1979	US: Gold
Dreams	The Allman Brothers Band	June 20, 1989	compilation	Tracks from Allman Brothers Band albums and other recordings, on four CDs or six LPs	US: Gold
Live at Ludlow Garage: 1970	The Allman Brothers Band	April 20, 1990	live	Recorded April 11, 1970	
The Layla Sessions: 20th Anniversary Edition	Derek and the Dominos	September 1990	studio	Layla and Other Assorted Love Songs and additional material from the 1970 recording sessions	
A Decade of Hits 1969–1979	The Allman Brothers Band	October 12, 1991	compilation	Tracks from six Allman Brothers Band albums, 1969–1979	US: Platinum
Fillmore East, February 1970	The Allman Brothers Band	1996	live	Recorded February 11–14, 1970	
All Live! (a.k.a. The Best of the Allman Brothers Band Live)	The Allman Brothers Band	1996	live	Recorded in 1971–1976; Duane plays on three tracks	
Mycology: An Anthology	The Allman Brothers Band	June 9, 1998	compilation	Duane Allman plays on one song, "Every Hungry Woman"	
20th Century Masters – The Millennium Collection: The Best of the Allman Brothers Band	The Allman Brothers Band	2000	compilation	Selections from Allman Brothers Band albums recorded in 1969–1979; Duane plays on 7 of 11 tracks	US: Gold
American University 12/13/70	The Allman Brothers Band	2002	live	Recorded December 13, 1970	
Live at the Atlanta International Pop Festival: July 3 & 5, 1970	The Allman Brothers Band	2003	live	Recorded July 3–5, 1970	
S.U.N.Y. at Stonybrook: Stonybrook, NY 9/19/71	The Allman Brothers Band	2003	live	Recorded September 19, 1971	
Stand Back: The Anthology	The Allman Brothers Band	June 8, 2004	compilation	Tracks from 13 Allman Brothers Band albums	
Southbound	Hour Glass	2004	compilation	All the bonus tracks from The Hour Glass and Power of Love CDs; Duane Allman plays on two songs	
Gold	The Allman Brothers Band	2005	compilation	Songs from the first eight Allman Brothers Band albums, recorded in 1969–1979; Duane plays on 18 of the 30 tracks	
Boston Common, 8/17/71	The Allman Brothers Band	2007	live	Recorded August 17, 1971	
Skydog: The Duane Allman Retrospective	Duane Allman	March 19, 2013	compilation	7-CD box set	
The 1971 Fillmore East Recordings	The Allman Brothers Band	July 29, 2014	live	Five complete concerts recorded on March 12, March 13, and June 27, 1971, on six CDs	
Live from A&R Studios	The Allman Brothers Band	2015	live	Recorded August 26, 1971	
Fillmore West '71	The Allman Brothers Band	2019	live	Recorded January 29–31, 1971	
Trouble No More: 50th Anniversary Collection	The Allman Brothers Band	February 28, 2020	compilation	Allman Brothers Band career retrospective on 5 CDs or 10 LPs	
The Final Note	The Allman Brothers Band	2020	live	Recorded October 17, 1971	
Down in Texas '71	The Allman Brothers Band	2021	live	Recorded September 28, 1971	
Syria Mosque	The Allman Brothers Band	2022	live	Recorded January 17, 1971	
