= Stand Back: The Anthology =

Greatest hits album by The Allman Brothers Band
- Released: June 8, 2004
- Genre: Southern rock
- Length: 2:34:36
- Label: Hip-O Records

The Allman Brothers Band chronology
One Way Out (2004)	Stand Back: The Anthology (2004)	The Essential Allman Brothers Band: The Epic Years (2004)

Professional ratings
Review scores
Source	Rating
AllMusic	4.5/5 stars

Stand Back: The Anthology is a compilation album by the Allman Brothers Band, released in 2004. It is the only retrospective which is cross-licensed among the different record labels for all of the band's studio recordings from its debut in 1969 through 2003.

== Track listing ==
=== Disc One ===
1. "Don't Want You No More" (Spencer Davis, Edward Hardin) – 2:25
2. "It's Not My Cross To Bear" (Gregg Allman) – 4:57
3. "Trouble No More" (McKinley Morganfield aka Muddy Waters) – 3:48
4. "Dreams" (Gregg Allman) – 7:20
5. "Whipping Post" (Gregg Allman) – 5:22
6. "Revival" (Dickey Betts) – 4:06
7. "Midnight Rider" (Gregg Allman, Robert Payne) – 2:59
8. "Hoochie Coochie Man" (Willie Dixon) – 4:57
9. "Statesboro Blues" (Live) (Blind Willie McTell) – 4:18
10. "In Memory of Elizabeth Reed" (Live) (Dickey Betts) – 13:06
11. "One Way Out" (Live) (Elmore James, Marshall Sehorn, Sonny Boy Williamson II) – 5:00
12. "Ain't Wastin' Time No More" (Gregg Allman) – 4:34
13. "Melissa" (Gregg Allman, Steve Alaimo) – 3:56
14. "Stand Back" (Gregg Allman, Berry Oakley) – 3:27
15. "Blue Sky" (Dickey Betts) – 5:12
16. "Little Martha" (Duane Allman) – 2:07

=== Disc Two ===
1. "Wasted Words" (Gregg Allman) – 4:20
2. "Ramblin' Man" (Dickey Betts) – 4:48
3. "Come and Go Blues" (Gregg Allman) – 4:56
4. "Southbound" (Dickey Betts) – 5:09
5. "Jessica" (Single version) (Dickey Betts) – 4:12
6. "Can't Lose What You Never Had" (McKinley Morganfield aka Muddy Waters) – 5:51
7. "Win, Lose or Draw" (Gregg Allman) – 4:46
8. "Crazy Love" (Dickey Betts) – 3:46
9. "Just Ain't Easy" (Gregg Allman) – 6:08
10. "Hell and High Water" (Dickey Betts) – 3:37
11. "Never Knew How Much (I Needed You)" (Gregg Allman) – 4:29
12. "Good Clean Fun" (Gregg Allman, Dickey Betts, Johnny Neel) – 5:11
13. "Seven Turns" (Dickey Betts) – 5:08
14. "End of the Line" (Gregg Allman, Warren Haynes, Allen Woody, John Jaworowicz) – 4:41
15. "No One to Run With" (Dickey Betts, John Prestia) – 6:02
16. "High Cost of Low Living" (Edit) (Gregg Allman, Warren Haynes, Jeff Anders, Ronnie Burgin) – 4:49
- Disc 1, Tracks 1–5 from The Allman Brothers Band (1969)
- Disc 1, Tracks 6–8 from Idlewild South (1970)
- Disc 1, Tracks 9–10 from At Fillmore East (1971)
- Disc 1, Tracks 11–16 from Eat a Peach (1972)
- Disc 2, Tracks 1–5 from Brothers and Sisters (1973)
- Disc 2, Tracks 6–7 from Win, Lose or Draw (1975)
- Disc 2, Tracks 8–9 from Enlightened Rogues (1979)
- Disc 2, Track 10 from Reach for the Sky (1980)
- Disc 2, Track 11 from Brothers of the Road (1981)
- Disc 2, Tracks 12–13 from Seven Turns (1990)
- Disc 2, Track 14 from Shades of Two Worlds (1991)
- Disc 2, Track 15 from Where It All Begins (1994)
- Disc 2, Track 16 (Full Version) from Hittin' the Note (2003)

==== Live Songs ====
- Disc 1, Tracks 9–10 recorded during the 1st Show on 3/13/1971 at the Fillmore East in New York, NY
- Disc 1, Track 11 recorded 6/27/1971 at the Fillmore East in New York, NY

== Personnel ==
- Gregg Allman - keyboards, guitar, lead and background vocals
- Duane Allman - guitar
- Dickey Betts - guitar, lead and background vocals
- Berry Oakley - bass, lead and background vocals
- Butch Trucks - drums, percussion
- Jai Johanny Johanson - drums, percussion
- Chuck Leavell - keyboards, background vocals
- Lamar Williams - bass
- Dan Toler - guitar
- David Goldflies - bass
- Bonnie Bramlett - background vocals
- David Toler - drums, percussion
- Mike Lawler - keyboards
- Warren Haynes - guitar, background vocals
- Allen Woody - bass, background vocals
- Johnny Neel - keyboards, background vocals
- Marc Quiñones - percussion
- Derek Trucks - guitar
- Oteil Burbridge - bass
