= Mycology: An Anthology =

Compilation album by The Allman Brothers Band
- Released: June 9, 1998
- Recorded: 1990–1994
- Genre: Southern rock
- Length: 60:13
- Label: 550 Music
- Producer: Tom Dowd

The Allman Brothers Band chronology
Fillmore East, February 1970 (1996)	Mycology: An Anthology (1998)	Peakin' at the Beacon (2000)

Professional ratings
Review scores
Source	Rating
AllMusic	3/5 stars

Mycology: An Anthology is a compilation album by the Allman Brothers Band. It contains songs selected from the band's albums for Epic Records — Seven Turns, Shades of Two Worlds, and Where It All Begins. It was released by 550 Music on June 9, 1998.

While the booklet indicates "Nobody Knows" is from An Evening with the Allman Brothers Band: First Set and "Sailin' 'Cross the Devil's Sea" is from An Evening with the Allman Brothers Band: 2nd Set, the versions on the CD are actually the studio versions.

== Track listing ==
1. "Good Clean Fun" (Gregg Allman, Dickey Betts, Johnny Neel) – 5:07
2. "Seven Turns" (Dickey Betts) – 5:03
3. "End of the Line" (Gregg Allman, Warren Haynes, Allen Woody, John Jaworowicz) – 4:37
4. "Get On With Your Life" (Gregg Allman) – 6:59
5. "Nobody Knows" (Live) (Dickey Betts) – 15:38
6. "No One to Run With" (Dickey Betts, John Prestia) – 5:59
7. "Back Where It All Begins" (Dickey Betts) – 9:10
8. "Sailin' 'Cross the Devil's Sea" (Live) (Gregg Allman, Warren Haynes, Allen Woody, Jack Pearson) – 4:49
9. "Midnight Rider" (Live) (Gregg Allman, Robert Payne) – 3:08
10. "Every Hungry Woman" (Live) (Gregg Allman) – 4:14
- Tracks 1–2 from Seven Turns (1990)
- Tracks 3–4 from Shades of Two Worlds (1991)
- Track 5 from An Evening with the Allman Brothers Band: First Set (1992)
- Tracks 6–7 from Where It All Begins (1994)
- Track 8 from An Evening with the Allman Brothers Band: 2nd Set (1995)
- Tracks 9–10 are previously unreleased; track 10 later released on Live at the Atlanta International Pop Festival: July 3 & 5, 1970 (2003)

=== Live Songs ===
- Track 5 recorded in 1991
- Track 8 recorded 8/16/1994 at the Garden State Arts Center in Holmdel, NJ
- Track 9 recorded 6/11/1992 at the R&R Club in Los Angeles, CA
- Track 10 recorded 7/3/1970 at the Atlanta International Pop Festival in Byron, GA

== Personnel ==
- Gregg Allman – organ, vocals, guitar
- Dickey Betts – guitar, vocals
- Warren Haynes – guitar, vocals (Tracks 1–9)
- Allen Woody – bass, vocals (Tracks 1–9)
- Jai Johanny Johanson – drums, percussion (Tracks 1–8 and 10)
- Butch Trucks – drums, percussion (Tracks 1–8 and 10)
- Johnny Neel – keyboards, vocals (Tracks 1–2)
- Marc Quiñones – congas, percussion (Tracks 3–8)
- Duane Allman – guitar (Track 10)
- Berry Oakley – bass (Track 10)
