= One Way Out (Allman Brothers Band album) =

Live album by the Allman Brothers Band
- Released: March 23, 2004
- Recorded: March 25–26, 2003
- Genres: Blues rock, southern rock, jam
- Length: 149:02
- Label: Sanctuary
- Producers: Michael Barbiero; Warren Haynes

The Allman Brothers Band chronology
S.U.N.Y. at Stonybrook: Stonybrook, NY 9/19/71 (2003)	One Way Out (2004)	Stand Back: The Anthology (2004)

Professional ratings
Review scores
Source	Rating
AllMusic	4/5 stars
Robert Christgau	A−

One Way Out is a live album by the Allman Brothers Band. It is the first live album to feature Warren Haynes and Derek Trucks together, although each had appeared separately on previous live albums. It was recorded during the group's annual Beacon Theatre run in New York City on March 25 and 26, 2003, and released a year later. This would be the final non-archival album released by the group before they disbanded in 2014.

The live version of "Instrumental Illness" was nominated for Best Rock Instrumental Performance at the 47th Annual Grammy Awards, but it lost to "Mrs. O'Leary's Cow" by Brian Wilson.

== Reception ==
Writer Robert Christgau awarded the album an A− rating, calling it the Allman Brothers Band's "best live album of their career because both age and youth suit them, and because [...] they're better now than they ever were". Thom Jurek, writing for AllMusic, praised the album's production, comparing the sound quality to that of a live performance and writing that the "listener is in the mix, not in front of it". Jurek additionally stated that the album "is essential for anyone interested in rock & roll".

In an article for All About Jazz, C. Michael Bailey commented on the novelty of the music, favorably comparing the Allman Brothers Band to others in the jam band movement, 1970s pop radio, and American rock band Little Feat. Bailey specifically praised the band for "completely reconstitut[ing] into units making new music as opposed to simply recapitulating the old". In a separate article for the same publication, Doug Collette called the album "without doubt the document of a truly great rock and roll ensemble playing with as much fire as finesse", and commented on the collaborative nature of the album's production and its improvisational style.

Writing for PopMatters, Adam Williams wrote that One Way Out is "flawless in all respects" and that "all doubts are dispelled as to who the finest live jammers are [...] the Allmans and the Beacon have become synonymous with extended play brilliance."

== Track listing ==
Disc one
No.	Title	Writer(s)	Original album	Length
1.	"Statesboro Blues"	Blind Willie McTell	At Fillmore East	5:22
2.	"Don't Keep Me Wonderin'"	Gregg Allman	Idlewild South	4:12
3.	"Midnight Rider"	Gregg Allman, Robert Payne	Idlewild South	3:16
4.	"Rockin' Horse"	Gregg Allman, Warren Haynes, Allen Woody, Jack Pearson	Hittin' the Note	10:12
5.	"Desdemona"	Gregg Allman, Warren Haynes	Hittin' the Note	13:27
6.	"Trouble No More"	Muddy Waters	The Allman Brothers Band	3:45
7.	"Wasted Words"	Gregg Allman	Brothers and Sisters	7:51
8.	"Good Morning Little Schoolgirl"	Sonny Boy Williamson		9:01
9.	"Instrumental Illness" (with 5:36 drum solo)	Warren Haynes, Oteil Burbridge	Hittin' the Note	16:42

Disc two
No.	Title	Writer(s)	Original album	Length
1.	"Ain't Wastin' Time No More"	Gregg Allman	Eat a Peach	6:29
2.	"Come and Go Blues"	Gregg Allman	Brothers and Sisters	6:03
3.	"Woman Across the River"	Bettye Crutcher, Allen Jones	Hittin' the Note	6:38
4.	"Old Before My Time"	Gregg Allman, Warren Haynes	Hittin' the Note	5:37
5.	"Every Hungry Woman"	Gregg Allman	The Allman Brothers Band	5:21
6.	"High Cost of Low Living"	Gregg Allman, Warren Haynes, Jeff Anders, Ronnie Burgin	Hittin' the Note	8:42
7.	"Worried Down with the Blues"	Warren Haynes, John Jaworowicz	The Deep End, Volume 1 (by Gov't Mule)	7:58
8.	"Dreams"	Gregg Allman	The Allman Brothers Band	12:49
9.	"Whipping Post"	Gregg Allman	The Allman Brothers Band	15:31

== Personnel ==
The Allman Brothers Band

- Gregg Allman – Hammond B-3 organ, piano, acoustic guitar, lead vocals
- Jaimoe – drums (left side)
- Butch Trucks – drums (right side)
- Warren Haynes – lead and slide guitars (right side), lead and background vocals
- Marc Quinones – congas, percussion, background vocals
- Oteil Burbridge – bass guitar
- Derek Trucks – lead and slide guitars (left side)

Production

- Producers: Michael Barbiero and Warren Haynes
- Recording and mixing: Michael Barbiero
- Assistant engineers: Mike Scielzi, Joel Singer
- Tape operator: Hardi Kamsani
- Stage: Brandon Karp
- Mastering: George Marino

== Charts ==
Chart (2004)	Peak position
US Billboard 200	190
