= The Road Goes On Forever (Allman Brothers Band album) =

Compilation album by the Allman Brothers Band
- Released: 1975; October 23, 2001 (2001 release)
- Recorded: 1969–1973; 1969–1979 (2001 release)
- Genre: Southern rock; blues rock
- Length: 84:40; 152:18 (2001 release)
- Label: Capricorn
- Producer: Tom Dowd and Johnny Sandlin

The Allman Brothers Band chronology
Win, Lose or Draw (1975)	The Road Goes On Forever (1975)	Wipe the Windows, Check the Oil, Dollar Gas (1976)

Professional ratings
Review scores
Source	Rating
Allmusic	4.5/5 stars
Christgau's Record Guide	A−
Rolling Stone Album Guide	3.5/5 stars

The Road Goes On Forever is the Allman Brothers Band's first compilation album, a two-LP set released in 1975. It features songs from the Allmans' first five albums. In 2001, an expanded edition was released featuring 13 more tracks. The album's title is a line from the song "Midnight Rider."

== Track listing ==
=== Side 1 ===
1. "Black Hearted Woman" (Gregg Allman) – 5:18
2. "Dreams" (Gregg Allman) – 7:19
3. "Whipping Post" (Gregg Allman) – 5:22
4. "Midnight Rider" (Gregg Allman, Robert Payne) – 3:00

=== Side 2 ===
1. "Statesboro Blues" (Live) (Blind Willie McTell) – 4:20
2. "Stormy Monday" (Live) (T-Bone Walker) – 8:50
3. "Hoochie Coochie Man" (Willie Dixon) – 4:58
4. "Stand Back" (Gregg Allman, Berry Oakley) – 3:26

=== Side 3 ===
1. "One Way Out" (Live) (Elmore James, Marshall Sehorn, Sonny Boy Williamson II) – 5:00
2. "Blue Sky" (Dickey Betts) – 5:11
3. "Hot 'Lanta" (Live) (Duane Allman, Gregg Allman, Dickey Betts, Berry Oakley, Butch Trucks, Jai Johanny Johanson) – 5:22
4. "Ain't Wastin' Time No More" (Gregg Allman) – 3:40
5. "Melissa" (Gregg Allman, Steve Alaimo) – 3:54

=== Side 4 ===
1. "Wasted Words" (Gregg Allman) – 4:20
2. "Jessica" (Dickey Betts) – 7:30
3. "Ramblin' Man" (Dickey Betts) – 4:50
4. "Little Martha" (Duane Allman) – 2:10
- Side 1, tracks 1–3 from The Allman Brothers Band (1969)
- Side 1, track 4; Side 2, track 3 from Idlewild South (1970)
- Side 2, tracks 1–2; Side 3, track 3 from At Fillmore East (1971)
- Side 2, track 4; Side 3, tracks 1–2 and 4–5; Side 4, track 4 from Eat a Peach (1972)
- Side 4, Tracks 1–3 from Brothers and Sisters (1973)

==== Live Songs ====
- Side 2, tracks 1–2 and Side 3, track 3 recorded 3/1971 at the Fillmore East in New York, NY
- Side 3, track 1 recorded 6/27/1971 at the Fillmore East in New York, NY

== 2001 Expanded Edition Track Listing ==
=== Disc One ===
1. "Don't Want You No More" (Spencer Davis, Edward Hardin) – 2:25
2. "It's Not My Cross to Bear" (Gregg Allman) – 4:57
3. "Black Hearted Woman" (Gregg Allman) – 5:18
4. "Trouble No More" (Muddy Waters) – 3:49
5. "Dreams" (Gregg Allman) – 7:19
6. "Whipping Post" (Gregg Allman) – 5:22
7. "Revival" (Dickey Betts) – 4:05
8. "Midnight Rider" (Gregg Allman, Robert Payne) – 3:00
9. "Don't Keep Me Wonderin'" (Gregg Allman) – 3:31
10. "Hoochie Coochie Man" (Willie Dixon) – 4:58
11. "Statesboro Blues" (Live, 3/1971 at the Fillmore East in New York, NY) (Blind Willie McTell) – 4:20
12. "Stormy Monday" (Live, 3/13/1971 at the Fillmore East in New York, NY) (T-Bone Walker) – 8:50
13. "Hot 'Lanta" (Live, 3/1971 at the Fillmore East in New York, NY) (Duane Allman, Gregg Allman, Dickey Betts, Berry Oakley, Butch Trucks, Jai Johanny Johanson) – 5:22
14. "In Memory of Elizabeth Reed" (Live, 3/1971 at the Fillmore East in New York, NY) (Dickey Betts) – 13:05

=== Disc Two ===
1. "One Way Out" (Live, 6/27/1971 at the Fillmore East in New York, NY) (Elmore James, Marshall Sehorn, Sonny Boy Williamson II) – 5:00
2. "Ain't Wastin' Time No More" (Gregg Allman) – 3:40
3. "Melissa" (Gregg Allman, Steve Alaimo) – 3:54
4. "Stand Back" (Gregg Allman, Berry Oakley) – 3:26
5. "Blue Sky" (Dickey Betts) – 5:11
6. "Little Martha" (Duane Allman) – 2:10
7. "Wasted Words" (Gregg Allman) – 4:20
8. "Ramblin' Man" (Dickey Betts) – 4:50
9. "Southbound" (Dickey Betts) – 5:10
10. "Jessica" (Dickey Betts) – 7:30
11. "Come and Go Blues" (Live, 7/28/1973 at the Racecourse in Watkins Glen, NY) (Gregg Allman) – 5:03
12. "Can't Lose What You Never Had" (Muddy Waters) – 5:54
13. "Win, Lose or Draw" (Gregg Allman) – 4:47
14. "Crazy Love" (Dickey Betts) – 3:45
15. "Can't Take It With You" (Dickey Betts, Don Johnson) – 3:36
16. "Pegasus" (Dickey Betts) – 7:31
- Disc 1, Tracks 1–6 from The Allman Brothers Band (1969)
- Disc 1, Tracks 7–10 from Idlewild South (1970)
- Disc 1, Tracks 11–14 from At Fillmore East (1971)
- Disc 2, Tracks 1–6 from Eat a Peach (1972)
- Disc 2, Track 7–10 from Brothers and Sisters (1973)
- Disc 2, Track 11 from Wipe the Windows, Check the Oil, Dollar Gas (1976)
- Disc 2, Tracks 12–13 from Win, Lose or Draw (1975)
- Disc 2, Tracks 14–16 from Enlightened Rogues (1979)

== Charts ==
Chart (1975–1976)	Peak position
UK Albums (OCC)	54
US Billboard 200	43
