= Macon City Auditorium: 2/11/72 =

Live album by Allman Brothers Band

Macon City Auditorium: Macon, GA 2/11/72

Live album by The Allman Brothers Band
- Released: 2004
- Recorded: February 11, 1972
- Venue: Macon City Auditorium; Macon, Georgia
- Genre: Southern rock
- Length: 97:44
- Label: The Allman Brothers Band Recording Company
- Producer: The Allman Brothers Band

The Allman Brothers Band chronology
The Essential Allman Brothers Band: The Epic Years (2004)	Macon City Auditorium: Macon, GA 2/11/72 (2004)	Nassau Coliseum, Uniondale, NY: 5/1/73 (2005)

Macon City Auditorium: Macon, GA 2/11/72 is a two-CD live album by the Allman Brothers Band. It was recorded at the Macon City Auditorium in Macon, Georgia on February 11, 1972. The third archival concert album from the Allman Brothers Band Recording Company, it was released in 2004.

The Macon City show was recorded several months after the death of guitarist Duane Allman. It therefore features the other five original members of the Allman Brothers Band – Gregg Allman on keyboards and vocals, Dickey Betts on guitar, Berry Oakley on bass, and Jai Johanny Johanson and Butch Trucks on drums.

== Critical reception ==
Professional ratings
Review scores
Source	Rating
Allmusic	3.5/5 stars
All About Jazz	4/5 stars

On AllMusic William Ruhlmann said, "After Duane died, the decision to continue without him was made quickly, but the band did not consider replacing him. Since a hallmark of their sound had been the twin guitar parts of Allman and Betts, however, some rearrangement of the material was necessary.... Betts plays some of Duane's parts on the familiar numbers of the repertoire... but he is reinventing himself as well as evoking his late partner in many of his solos..."

In All About Jazz Doug Collette wrote, "The only other recorded evidence available of the quintet lineup are the three opening cuts of Eat a Peach... but the raw, streamlined sound of this unit isn't all that different from the original Allman sextet: guitarist/vocalist Dickey Betts leads his four brothers in conjuring up an intensity arguably equal to sets played with their departed founder..."

On jambands.com Larson Sutton said, "The band is brilliant over the course of the two discs, particularly shining on the 20+ minutes of "You Don't Love Me". Despite this powerful, moving night of music, there is no avoiding Duane's absence. The performances, while deeply impressive, could not be the same without him. The lack of that second lead instrument is at times glaring, and yet this is exactly what makes this album so intriguing and unique."

== Track listing ==
Disc one

1. "Statesboro Blues" (Blind Willie McTell) – 4:09
2. "Done Somebody Wrong" (Elmore James, Clarence Lewis, Bobby Robinson) – 3:34
3. "Ain't Wastin' Time No More" (Gregg Allman) – 4:15
4. "One Way Out" (Elmore James, Marshall Sehorn, Sonny Boy Williamson II) – 6.49
5. "Midnight Rider" (Gregg Allman, Robert Payne) – 2:55
6. "You Don't Love Me" (Willie Cobbs) – 21:37
7. "Stormy Monday" (T-Bone Walker) – 7:58
8. "Hoochie Coochie Man" (Willie Dixon) – 4:40
9. "Hot 'Lanta" (Duane Allman, Gregg Allman, Dickey Betts, Berry Oakley, Butch Trucks, Jai Johanny Johanson) – 5:07

Disc two

1. "Les Brers in A Minor" (Dickey Betts) – 11:14
2. "Trouble No More" (Muddy Waters) – 3:53
3. "Whipping Post" (Gregg Allman) – 15:45

== Personnel ==
Allman Brothers Band

- Gregg Allman – vocals, Hammond B3 organ, Wurlitzer electric piano
- Dickey Betts – lead and slide guitars
- Berry Oakley – bass guitar, vocals
- Jaimoe – drums, percussion
- Butch Trucks – drums, tympani

Production

- Recording produced by the Allman Brothers Band
- Package produced by Kirk West, Bert Holman
- Live mixing: Mike Callahan
- Mastering: John Kunz
- Engineering: Lee Roy Parnell, Skip Littlewood
- Tape archivist: Kirk West
- Package design: Jeff Faith
- Liner notes: John Lynskey
