= Fillmore West '71 =

Live album by The Allman Brothers Band
- Released: September 6, 2019
- Recorded: January 29–31, 1971
- Venues: Fillmore West; San Francisco
- Genres: Blues rock, Southern rock
- Length: 275:12
- Label: Allman Brothers Band Recording Company

The Allman Brothers Band chronology
Cream of the Crop 2003 (2018)	Fillmore West '71 (2019)	Trouble No More: 50th Anniversary Collection (2020)

Fillmore West '71 is a four-CD live album by the Allman Brothers Band. It was recorded January 29 – January 31, 1971, at the Fillmore West in San Francisco. It was released on September 6, 2019.

At these three concerts at Bill Graham's Fillmore West, the Allman Brothers were the middle of three acts, following the Trinidad Tripoli Steel Band and preceding top-billed Hot Tuna. The album contains the ABB's complete performances from these shows. It also includes a bonus track of a lengthy "Mountain Jam" recorded about ten months earlier at the Warehouse in New Orleans, which is notable for being the longest recorded version of the song at 45 minutes.

== Critical reception ==
Professional ratings
Review scores
Source	Rating
All About Jazz	3.5/5 stars
AllMusic	4/5 stars

On AllMusic, Thom Jurek said, "A revelation of these recordings is what they say about the Allmans' development and how much more polished they were just six weeks later [on At Fillmore East], which doesn't diminish the earlier dates one iota: These performances are absolutely electrifying. They are wooly and intensely exploratory.... Despite the minor flaws in the sound on some of this, Allman Brothers Band fans will find these kinetic performances essential, and likely even revelatory."

In the Sarasota Herald-Tribune, Wade Tatangelo wrote, "While the sound quality at times borderlines on good bootleg quality, Fillmore West '71 should be a welcome addition to Allman Brothers fans, especially ones interested in soaking up the output of the original lineup... In 1971, there wasn't a rock band on the planet offering a synthesis of rock, blues, jazz and country quite like the Allman Brothers. Touring in support of their second studio album, Idlewild South, the band had perfected a killer live show consisting of epic originals and innovative covers, all given to fresh improvisation on a nightly basis."

Doug Collette of All About Jazz stated: "the best moments hearken to the brilliance of the seminal At Fillmore East..., but the musicianship on fully half the collection is muffled by production that... belies the rigor of the Southern rock pioneers in the original six-man lineup documented here."

Writing for Relix, Jeff Tamarkin praised the "uniformly stellar performances," and commented: "these guys were clearly not going to be second-billed much longer, though Duane would die that October."

In a review for Tahoe Onstage, Tom Clarke noted that, in comparison with the music on At Fillmore East, "the performances at times seem more relaxed, the nuances sharper," and stated that the album is "recommended to anyone interested in enjoying an utterly unique approach to the blues."

Larson Sutton of Jambands.com described the music as "scintillating," and remarked: "the daring, amphetamine ambition of the tempos and the wild and dark edging of the extended jams that populate this trio of appearances seem to epitomize the streets of psychedelic San Francisco."

Sea of Tranquility's Pete Pardo wrote: "Magical stuff here from a band that were pretty much untouchable in a live setting... Fillmore West '71 is a mandatory purchase for any Allman Brothers Band fan."

Commenting for Glide Magazine, Jim Hynes stated: "these are the same tunes on the east coast Fillmore album, perhaps a bit more ragged, as the band was shaping their sound but there's a pulsating energy and spontaneity across these four CDs that's very bit as good, at times better than the versions of these tunes that are burned into our collective consciousness... These were young cats playing freely and establishing themselves."

== Track listing ==
Disc 1

January 29, 1971

1. "Statesboro Blues" (Will McTell) – 4:20
2. "Trouble No More" (McKinley Morganfield) – 4:10
3. "Don't Keep Me Wonderin'" (Gregg Allman) – 3:27
4. "In Memory of Elizabeth Reed" (Dickey Betts) – 14:28
5. "Midnight Rider" (G. Allman, Robert Payne) – 3:14
6. "Dreams" (G. Allman) – 11:37
7. "You Don't Love Me" (Willie Cobbs) – 16:49
8. "Whipping Post" (G. Allman) – 18:50

Disc 2

January 30, 1971

1. "Statesboro Blues" (McTell) – 4:18
2. "Trouble No More" (Morganfield) – 3:57
3. "Don't Keep Me Wonderin'" (G. Allman) – 3:50
4. "In Memory of Elizabeth Reed" (Betts) – 11:46
5. "Stormy Monday" (T-Bone Walker) – 9:04
6. "You Don't Love Me" (Cobbs) – 16:21
7. "Whipping Post" (G. Allman) – 16:01

Disc 3

January 31, 1971

1. "Statesboro Blues" (McTell) – 4:29
2. "Trouble No More" (Morganfield) – 4:05
3. "Don't Keep Me Wonderin'" (G. Allman) – 3:41
4. "In Memory of Elizabeth Reed" (Betts) – 12:27
5. "Midnight Rider" (G. Allman, Payne) – 3:05
6. "Hoochie Coochie Man" (Willie Dixon) – 4:55
7. "Dreams" (G. Allman) – 10:49
8. "You Don't Love Me" (Cobbs) – 17:10

Disc 4

January 31, 1971, continued

1. "Hot 'Lanta" (G. Allman, Duane Allman, Betts, Berry Oakley, Butch Trucks, Jai Johanny Johanson) – 5:31
2. "Whipping Post" (G. Allman) – 20:53

March 13, 1970 – The Warehouse, New Orleans

3. "Mountain Jam" (Donovan Leitch, G. Allman, D. Allman, Betts, Oakley, Trucks, Johanson) – 45:42

== Personnel ==
The Allman Brothers Band

- Duane Allman – lead and slide guitars
- Gregg Allman – Hammond B-3 organ, vocals
- Dickey Betts – lead guitar
- Berry Oakley – bass, vocals on "Hoochie Coochie Man"
- Jaimoe – drums, percussion
- Butch Trucks – drums, tympani

Production

- Executive producer: Bert Holman
- Project supervision: Kirk West, John Lynskey, Bill Levenson
- Mastering: Tom Lewis
- Package design – Terry Bradley
- Photography – Jim Marshall
- Liner notes: John Lynskey
