= The Final Note =

Live album by The Allman Brothers Band
- Released: October 16, 2020
- Recorded: October 17, 1971
- Venue: Painters Mill Music Fair; Owings Mills, Maryland
- Genre: Blues rock, Southern rock
- Label: Allman Brothers Band Recording Company

The Allman Brothers Band chronology
| Trouble No More: 50th Anniversary Collection (2020) | The Final Note (2020) | Warner Theatre, Erie, PA 7-19-05 (2020) |

The Final Note is a live album by the Allman Brothers Band. It was recorded on October 17, 1971 at the Painters Mill Music Fair in Owings Mills, Maryland. It was released on October 16, 2020.

The Final Note documents the last performance by guitarist Duane Allman, who died in a motorcycle accident twelve days later. The album includes part of the concert, and was recorded by a music journalist using a hand-held cassette recorder with an internal microphone.

== Critical reception ==
On AllMusic, Thom Jurek said, "The band's eight-song performance is deeply satisfying musically. From top to bottom, they leave everything on the stage, with no letup.... If you can forgive the somewhat dodgy sound, The Final Note is an essential addition to ABB lore and captures the band at their kinetic best."

In the Sarasota Herald-Tribune, Wade Tatangelo wrote, "The Final Note presents not just Duane Allman’s last show but a band at the height of its power with an audience elated to witness the pioneering Southern rockers.... And the sound quality, it should be stressed, will be fine for anyone with bootleg ears, and is likely to grow on the uninitiated."

In Under the Radar, Frank Valish said, "Given that The Final Note was sourced from a cassette tape crowd recording from the early '70s, the sound quality is not terrific. But fidelity aside (and the sound here is not bad, considering the circumstances), the historic nature of the concert takes ultimate precedence.... Duane Allman's slide guitar takes front and center stage from the opener..."

In All About Jazz, C. Michael Bailey wrote, "An audience recording made on a 60-minute cassette tape by radio music journalist Sam Idas, the performance sounds exactly like that, an audience live recording, probably like the myriad of similar recordings made of the Grateful Dead by enthusiastic fans. The recording has a deeply organic and spontaneous sound. Hearing it today is akin to reading the Dead Sea Scrolls in all of their flawed glory on the day they were discovered."

== Track listing ==
1. "Statesboro Blues" (Will McTell) – 5:01
2. "Trouble No More" (McKinley Moganfield) – 4:43
3. "Don't Keep Me Wondering" (Gregg Allman) – 4:03
4. "Done Somebody Wrong" (Clarence Lewis, Elmore James, Morris Levy) – 3:36
5. "One Way Out" (Marshall Sehorn, Elmore James) – 5:26
6. "In Memory of Elizabeth Reed" [incomplete] (Dickey Betts) – 6:09
7. "Hot 'Lanta" (Gregg Allman, Duane Allman, Dickey Betts, Butch Trucks, Berry Oakley, Jai Johanny Johanson) – 7:40
8. "Whipping Post" (Gregg Allman) – 12:48

== Personnel ==
The Allman Brothers Band

- Duane Allman – lead and slide guitars
- Gregg Allman – vocals, Hammond B3 organ
- Dickey Betts – lead guitar
- Berry Oakley – bass guitar
- Jaimoe – drums, percussion
- Butch Trucks – drums, tympani

Additional musicians

- Juicy Carter – saxophone on "In Memory of Elizabeth Reid", "Hot 'Lanta", "Whipping Post"

Production

- Produced by the Allman Brothers Band
- Executive producer: Bert Holman
- Project supervision: Kirk West, John Lynskey, Bill Levenson
- Liner notes: John Lineskey
- Mastering: Jason NeSmith
- Centerfold photo: Kathy Hurley
- Package design: Terry Bradley

== Charts ==
Chart performance for The Final Note
| Chart (2021) | Peak position |
|---|---|
| US Billboard 200 | 168 |
