= An Evening with the Allman Brothers Band: 2nd Set =

Live album by The Allman Brothers Band
- Released: May 9, 1995
- Recorded: 1992, 1994
- Studio: Mixing, Criteria Studios Miami Florida
- Genre: Southern rock
- Length: 71:56
- Label: Epic
- Producer: Tom Dowd

The Allman Brothers Band chronology
Where It All Begins (1994)	An Evening with the Allman Brothers Band: 2nd Set (1995)	Fillmore East, February 1970 (1996)

Professional ratings
Review scores
Source	Rating
Allmusic	4.5/5 stars
The Music Box	3.5/5 stars
Rolling Stone	3.5/5 stars

An Evening with the Allman Brothers Band: 2nd Set is a live album by the American rock group the Allman Brothers Band. It was recorded in 1992 and 1994, and released in 1995. The recording of "In Memory of Elizabeth Reed" was nominated for a Grammy Award for Best Pop Instrumental Performance at the 38th Annual Grammy Awards, but it lost to "Mariachi Suite" by Los Lobos. The recording of "Jessica" included on the album won a Grammy Award for Best Rock Instrumental Performance at the 38th Annual Grammy Awards in 1996.

== Track listing ==
1. "Sailin' 'Cross the Devil's Sea" (Gregg Allman, Warren Haynes, Allen Woody, Jack Pearson) – 4:49
2. "You Don't Love Me" (Willie Cobbs) – 6:36
3. "Soulshine" (Warren Haynes) – 6:42
4. "Back Where It All Begins" (Dickey Betts) – 12:32
5. "In Memory of Elizabeth Reed" (Dickey Betts) – 10:15
6. "The Same Thing" (Willie Dixon) – 8:22
7. "No One to Run With" (Dickey Betts, John Prestia) – 6:29
8. "Jessica" (Dickey Betts) – 16:09
- Tracks 1, 3, 4, 6, 7 Recorded at Garden State Arts Center Holmdel, NJ on August 16, 1994
- Tracks 2 and 8 Recorded at Walnut Creek Amphitheatre in Raleigh, NC on July 1, 1994
- Track 5 Recorded at R&R Club in Los Angeles, CA on June 11, 1992

== Personnel ==
=== The Allman Brothers Band ===
- Gregg Allman – Hammond B-3 organ, acoustic guitar, lead vocals
- Dickey Betts – lead and rhythm guitar, acoustic guitar, lead vocals
- Jaimoe – drums, percussion on "The Same Thing", background vocals
- Butch Trucks – drums, tympani, background vocals
- Warren Haynes – lead, rhythm, and slide guitar, acoustic guitar, lead and background vocals
- Allen Woody – bass, fretless bass, 6 string bass, acoustic bass, background vocals
- Marc Quinones – congas, percussion, drums on "The Same Thing"

=== Additional musicians ===
- Paul T. Riddle – drums on "Jessica", "You Don't Love Me"

=== Production ===
- Produced by: Tom Dowd
- Mixed by: Jay Mark
- Second engineer: Steve Robillard
- Live recordings by: David Hewitt, Biff Dawes, Bud Snyder, John Falzarano
- Mastered by: Vlado Meller
- Digital editing engineer: Charles Dye

== Charts ==
Chart (1995)	Peak position
US Billboard 200	88

== See also ==
- An Evening with the Allman Brothers Band: First Set
