= The Road Goes On Forever =

The Road Goes On Forever may refer to:

- The Road Goes On Forever (The Allman Brothers Band album), 1975
- "The Road Goes On Forever", a 1989 song by Robert Earl Keen
- The Road Goes On Forever (The Highwaymen album), 1995

== See also ==
- The Road Goes Ever On, a song cycle by Donald Swann, words from J.R.R. Tolkien's poems
