= American University 12/13/70 =

Live album by The Allman Brothers Band
- Released: April 2002
- Recorded: December 13, 1970
- Venue: American University; Washington, D.C.
- Genre: Southern rock, blues rock, jam band
- Length: 60:42
- Label: Allman Brothers Band Recording Company
- Producer: Allman Brothers Band

The Allman Brothers Band chronology
Peakin' at the Beacon (2000)	American University 12/13/70 (2002)	Hittin' the Note (2003)

American University 12/13/70 is a live album by the Allman Brothers Band. The first of a series of archival concert recordings from the Allman Brothers Band Recording Company, it features the group's original lineup. It was released in April 2002.

On December 13, 1970, the band played two concerts at American University in Washington, D.C. The first five songs on the album are from the late show, and the last two songs are from the early show.

== Critical reception ==
Professional ratings
Review scores
Source	Rating
Allmusic	3/5 stars
Guitar World	4/5 stars

On AllMusic, William Ruhlmann said, "There is little new here, but the playing is fierce, especially the interaction of Duane Allman and Dickey Betts, and with a solid 20-plus-minute version of "Whipping Post", Allman Brothers Band fans should be pleased with the band's first self-released effort."

Alan Paul wrote in Guitar World, "... the sudden appearance of a virtually unheard Duane-era ABB performance is big news, making it an excellent choice to debut the band's series of sanctioned, self-released archive CDs. It doesn't hurt, of course, that the band's December 13, 1970 performance was top notch."

== Track listing ==
1. "Statesboro Blues" (Blind Willie McTell) – 4:34
2. "Trouble No More" (McKinley Morganfield) – 3:49
3. "Don't Keep Me Wonderin'" (Gregg Allman) – 3:46
4. "Leave My Blues At Home" (Gregg Allman) – 6:45
5. "Stormy Monday" (T-Bone Walker) – 5:03
6. "You Don't Love Me" (Willie Cobbs) – 15:48
7. "Whipping Post" (Gregg Allman) – 20:40

== Personnel ==
The Allman Brothers Band

- Duane Allman – slide guitar and lead guitar
- Gregg Allman – vocals, Hammond B-3 organ
- Dickey Betts – lead guitar
- Berry Oakley – bass guitar
- Jaimoe – drums, percussion
- Butch Trucks – drums, tympani

Production

- Recording produced by the Allman Brothers Band
- Package produced by Kirk West, Bert Holman
- Executive producer: Tom Dowd
- Live mixing: Mike Callahan
- CD Mastering: Vlado Meller
- Audio restoration, digital editing: Robb Navrides
- Package design: Jeff Faith
- Liner notes: Bert Holman
