= Renaissance Man (album) =

Studio album by Jaimoe's Jasssz Band
- Released: 2011
- Studios: Water Music, Hoboken, New Jersey
- Genre: Jazz
- Length: 1:04:07
- Labels: Lil' Johnieboy Records; 17682

Jaimoe's Jasssz Band chronology
Ed Blackwell Memorial Concert 02/27/2008 (2008)	Renaissance Man (2011)	Live at 2016 Wanee Music Festival (2016)

Renaissance Man is an album by Jaimoe's Jasssz Band, a group led by drummer and percussionist Jaimoe (also referred to as Jai Johanny Johanson), best known as a founding member of The Allman Brothers Band. On the album, which was released in 2011 by Lil' Johnieboy Records, Jaimoe is joined by guitarist and vocalist Junior Mack, saxophonists Kris Jensen and Paul Lieberman, trumpeter Reggie Pittman, keyboardists Bruce Katz and Jon Davis, and bassist David Stoltz. Percussionists Lafrae Olivia Sci and Marc Quiñones also appear on several tracks.

Renaissance Man, which features a blend of covers and original songs by band members, was the Jasssz Band's first studio release, following two live albums. According to Jaimoe, the album is "completely different" from the first two recordings, and he noted that "the band has evolved in different ways. From bebop with no vocals, to vocals and now three horns." When asked to describe the band, he responded: "We are a jamband... and we play jazz, which is American music. We haven't gotten any hillbilly in there yet, but we play just about everything."

== Reception ==
Professional ratings
Review scores
Source	Rating
Goldmine	4/5 stars
One Way Out: The Inside History of the Allman Brothers Band	4/5 stars

A reviewer for Goldmine stated that the "Allman stamp is all over" the album, and noted that Junior Mack "sings so sweet and soulful and positively stings that guitar." The reviewer concluded: "Jaimoe knows what to do. Still."

Louis R. Carlozo of The Christian Century called the album "an accomplished mix of blues, jazz-pop and jam-band music," and praised the band's version of "Melissa" for its "sublime sweetness."

Writing for Relix, Brad Farberman commented: "As evidenced by his work with the Allmans... Jaimoe is all about the band, and the focus here is most often on the ensemble as a whole."

In an article for Something Else!, Nick Deriso described the album as "a bubbling roux of soul-lifting Southern rock..., simmering R&B and swinging polyrhythmic verve."

Cincinnati CityBeat's Brian Baker wrote: "Renaissance Man is tailor-made for fans of the Allman Brothers by one of the band's legendary founders. It's a work that acknowledges its obvious roots and then finds new and fascinating directions to go within its well-travelled construct."

Eric Feber of The Virginian-Pilot remarked: "This offering by Jaimoe's Jasssz Band shows what a group of six seasoned music veterans can do when led by drummer extraordinaire Jai Johanny 'Jaimoe' Johanson... The septet crafts a swinging, skillfully executed body of jams embracing blues-rock, soul, jazz, pop-jazz and ballads... Jaimoe and his mates do it all and do it well."

Author Alan Paul called the album "a fantastic collection of songs" and "a sleeper album in the Allman Brothers Band family tree."

== Track listing ==
1. "Dilemma" (Junior Mack) – 8:49
2. "Drifting and Turning" (Junior Mack) – 7:49
3. "Leaving Trunk" (John Estes) – 6:32
4. "I Believe I'll Make a Change" (Junior Mack) – 6:36
5. "Rainy Night in Georgia" (Tony Joe White) – 5:44
6. "Hippology" (Bruce Katz) – 4:21
7. "Laurie Ann Blue" (Junior Mack) – 5:58
8. "Melissa" (Gregg Allman) – 5:43
9. "Simple Song" (David Stoltz) – 7:03
10. "Points of Friendship" (Reggie Pittman) – 5:36

== Personnel ==
- Jaimoe – drums
- Junior Mack – guitar, vocals
- Kris Jensen – tenor saxophone, baritone saxophone
- Paul Lieberman – alto saxophone, tenor saxophone, flute
- Reggie Pittman – trumpet, flugelhorn
- Bruce Katz – organ, piano
- Jon Davis – piano
- David Stoltz – bass
- Lafrae Olivia Sci – percussion (tracks 1 and 8)
- Marc Quiñones – percussion (track 7)
