= Peakin' at the Beacon =

Live album by The Allman Brothers Band
- Released: November 14, 2000
- Recorded: March 9–25, 2000
- Genre: Southern rock
- Length: 74:06
- Label: Epic
- Producer: The Allman Brothers Band

The Allman Brothers Band chronology
| Mycology: An Anthology (1998) | Peakin' at the Beacon (2000) | American University 12/13/70 (2002) |

Professional ratings
Review scores
| Source | Rating |
|---|---|
| Allmusic | 3/5 stars |
| Rolling Stone | 3/5 stars |
| All About Jazz | (favorable) |

Peakin' at the Beacon is a live album by the rock group the Allman Brothers Band. It was recorded at the Beacon Theatre in New York City in March, 2000, and released later that year.

Peakin' at the Beacon was the first Allman Brothers Band album to include Derek Trucks on guitar and Oteil Burbridge on bass, and the last to include founding member Dickey Betts.

The instrumental "High Falls" was nominated for Best Rock Instrumental Performance at the 44th Annual Grammy Awards, losing to "Dirty Mind" by Jeff Beck.

This version of the Idlewild South track "Please Call Home" was featured on their greatest hits album The Essential Allman Brothers Band: The Epic Years.

== Track listing ==
All songs written by Gregg Allman, except where noted.

1. "Don't Want You No More" (Spencer Davis, Edward Hardin) – 3:06
2. "It's Not My Cross to Bear" – 5:12
3. "Ain't Wastin' Time No More" – 5:46
4. "Every Hungry Woman" – 5:56
5. "Please Call Home" – 4:30
6. "Stand Back" (Gregg Allman, Berry Oakley) – 5:44
7. "Black Hearted Woman" – 6:30
8. "Leave My Blues at Home" – 5:07
9. "Seven Turns" (Dickey Betts) – 4:48
10. "High Falls" (Dickey Betts) – 27:27

== Personnel ==
=== The Allman Brothers Band ===
- Gregg Allman – organ, piano, acoustic guitar, vocals
- Dickey Betts – guitar, vocals
- Derek Trucks – guitar
- Oteil Burbridge – bass
- Butch Trucks – drums, percussion
- Jaimoe – drums, percussion
- Marc Quiñones – conga, percussion, vocals

=== Production ===
- The Allman Brothers Band – producer
- Bud Snyder – producer, engineer, mixing, live sound
- Vladimir Meller – mastering
- Bruce Judd – engineer
- Mark Withrow – engineer
- Joe Zimmerman – art direction
