= Fillmore East, February 1970 =

Live album by The Allman Brothers Band
- Released: 1996
- Recorded: February 11–14, 1970
- Genres: Southern rock, blues rock
- Length: 71:20
- Label: Grateful Dead
- Producer: Owsley Stanley

The Allman Brothers Band chronology
An Evening with the Allman Brothers Band: 2nd Set (1995)	Fillmore East, February 1970 (1996)	Mycology: An Anthology (1998)

Bear's Sonic Journals chronology
Bear's Sonic Journals: Never the Same Way Once (2017)	Bear's Sonic Journals: Fillmore East, February 1970 (2018)	Bear's Sonic Journals: Before We Were Them (2019)

Alternative cover
- Bear's Sonic Journals: Fillmore East, February 1970

Fillmore East, February 1970 is a live album by the rock group the Allman Brothers Band. It was recorded by Owsley Stanley at the Fillmore East in Manhattan on February 11, 13, and 14, 1970. It was released on CD in 1996.

In 2018, the album was remastered and rereleased by the Owsley Stanley Foundation, with the title Bear's Sonic Journals: Fillmore East, February 1970. There are two different versions of this release. One contains the same material as the original album. The other is the Deluxe Edition, on three CDs, with two discs containing all the music that was captured on tape at the concerts.

== The February 1970 concerts ==
On February 11, 13, and 14, 1970, the Allman Brothers Band, along with the Grateful Dead and Love, played at Bill Graham's Fillmore East auditorium in New York City. The performances were taped by the Grateful Dead's sound engineer, Owsley ("Bear") Stanley.

Fillmore East, February 1970 is composed of selections from those concerts. The album was produced by Stanley, who also wrote the liner notes. It was mastered by the Dead's recording engineer, Jeffrey Norman. It was released on the Grateful Dead label, in cooperation with the Allman Brothers' record company at the time, PolyGram Records.

Performances by the Grateful Dead from the same set of shows have been released on two albums – Bear's Choice, and Dick's Picks Volume 4.

== Critical reception ==
Professional ratings
Review scores
Source	Rating
All About Jazz	4/5 stars
AllMusic	4/5 stars
The Music Box	5/5 stars
Encyclopedia of Popular Music	4/5 stars

On AllMusic, Lindsay Planer wrote, "There is no mistaking the unbridled fervor of the original line-up of the band. Rising to the challenge of exploratory psychedelia – while remaining ever faithful to their Southern blues roots... Likewise, the Allman Brothers were beginning to ascend as not only premier interpreters, but purveyors of a revolutionary new electric guitar-driven blues movement".

In The Music Box, John Metzger said, "... the disc opens with a scorching rendition of "In Memory of Elizabeth Reed" that simply grooves. Dickey Betts and Duane Allman are magnificent, as they play with reckless abandon, yet tightly in synch. The highlight of this album, however, is the nearly 31-minute "Mountain Jam" that drips with a colorfully electrified intensity."

In Glide Magazine, Doug Collette wrote, "Almost a year after the formation of the seminal Southern rock band... the original sextet was homing in on the sound that would lend itself to At Fillmore East, the epic recordings done thirteen months later at the same venue. Yet even as the group... was honing the influential style that would make them famous, they were stretching themselves as well, shuffling novel and well-established material in and out of their repertoire."

Doug Collette of All About Jazz commented: "At its most dramatic peaks, the Allman Brothers Band's collective musicianship was nigh-on miraculous to behold and never more so than with its original personnel. As the septet approached the first anniversary of their formation, the accelerated process of their growth supplies only more evidence to that end."

== Track listing ==
=== Original album ===
No.	Title	Writer(s)	Recording date(s)	Length
1.	"In Memory of Elizabeth Reed"	Dickey Betts	Feb. 14	9:19
2.	"Hoochie Coochie Man"	Willie Dixon	Feb. 14	6:01
3.	"Statesboro Blues"	Will McTell	Feb. 11	4:18
4.	"Trouble No More"	McKinley Morganfield	Feb. 11	4:12
5.	"Outskirts of Town"	William Weldon, Roy Jordan	Feb. 13 & 14	8:28
6.	"Whipping Post"	Gregg Allman	Feb. 14	8:12
7.	"Mountain Jam"	Donovan Leitch, Duane Allman, G. Allman, Betts, Jai Johanny Johanson, Berry Oakley, Butch Trucks	Feb. 14 & 13	30:48

=== Deluxe Edition ===
Disc 1 – Compilation (same as original album)
No.	Title	Recording date(s)	Length
1.	"In Memory of Elizabeth Reed"	Feb. 14	9:22
2.	"Hoochie Coochie Man"	Feb. 14	6:05
3.	"Statesboro Blues"	Feb. 11	4:17
4.	"Trouble No More"	Feb. 11	4:11
5.	"Outskirts of Town"	Feb. 13 & 14	8:30
6.	"Whipping Post"	Feb. 14	8:11
7.	"Mountain Jam"	Feb. 14 & 13	30:46

Disc 2 – Chapters 1 & 2
No.	Title	Recording date	Length
1.	"In Memory of Elizabeth Reed"	Feb. 11	11:58
2.	"Statesboro Blues"	Feb. 11	4:17
3.	"Trouble No More"	Feb. 11	4:42
4.	"Hoochie Coochie Man"	Feb. 11	4:35
5.	"Mountain Jam" (reel-change gap)	Feb. 11	18:49
6.	"In Memory of Elizabeth Reed"	Feb. 13	7:50
7.	"Outskirts of Town" (end cut)	Feb. 13	7:48
8.	"Mountain Jam" (start cut)	Feb. 13	18:29

Disc 3 – Chapter 3
No.	Title	Recording date	Length
1.	"In Memory of Elizabeth Reed"	Feb. 14	9:26
2.	"Hoochie Coochie Man"	Feb. 14	5:08
3.	"Outskirts of Town" (reel-change gap)	Feb. 14	7:57
4.	"Whipping Post"	Feb. 14	8:11
5.	"Mountain Jam" (reel-change gap)	Feb. 14	35:01

Note: "Discs 2 & 3 contain the sonic journal reels of the three shows as recorded each night, unaltered. Portions from these three chapters were used to create the compilation album (disc 1)."

== Personnel ==
The Allman Brothers Band

- Duane Allman – lead and slide guitars
- Gregg Allman – vocals, Hammond B-3 Organ
- Dickey Betts – lead guitar
- Berry Oakley – bass, vocals on "Hoochie Coochie Man"
- Jaimoe – drums, percussion
- Butch Trucks – drums, timpani

Production

- Owsley Stanley – producer, sound recording
- Jeffrey Norman – digital editing
- John Chester, Jamie Howarth, Plangent Processes – tape to digital transfer and speed correction
- Dick Latvala – tape archivist and facilitator
- Kirk West – associate producer and logistical coordinator
- Bob Johnson – photos
- Gecko Graphics – design
