= A Decade of Hits 1969–1979 =

A Decade of Hits 1969-1979

Greatest hits album by The Allman Brothers Band
- Released: October 22, 1991
- Recorded: 1969–1979
- Genre: Southern rock
- Length: 75:46
- Label: Polydor
- Producer: Tom Dowd, Adrian Barber

The Allman Brothers Band chronology
Shades of Two Worlds (1991)	A Decade of Hits 1969-1979 (1991)	Live at Great Woods (1992)

A Decade of Hits 1969–1979 is a compilation album of the Allman Brothers Band, released in 1991. The album features songs released on The Allman Brothers Band, Idlewild South, At Fillmore East, Eat a Peach, Brothers and Sisters, and Enlightened Rogues. It is the band's best-selling album in the U.S., being certified double platinum by the RIAA in 1997.

== Critical reception ==
On AllMusic, Bret Adams said, "It would be easy to argue that individual albums like Idlewild South, At Fillmore East, Eat a Peach, or Brothers and Sisters are more cohesive artistic statements, but no self-respecting rock & roll fan should be without a copy of A Decade of Hits 1969-1979, which includes the cream of those albums."

== Track listing ==
1. "Statesboro Blues" (Live) (Blind Willie McTell) – 4:20
2. "Ramblin' Man" (Dickey Betts) – 4:49
3. "Midnight Rider" (Gregg Allman, Robert Payne) – 2:59
4. "Southbound" (Dickey Betts) – 5:10
5. "Melissa" (Gregg Allman, Steve Alaimo) – 3:56
6. "Jessica" (Dickey Betts) – 7:30
7. "Ain't Wastin' Time No More" (Gregg Allman) – 3:40
8. "Little Martha" (Duane Allman) – 2:10
9. "Crazy Love" (Dickey Betts) – 3:44
10. "Revival" (Dickey Betts) – 4:03
11. "Wasted Words" (Gregg Allman) – 4:20
12. "Blue Sky" (Dickey Betts) – 5:10
13. "One Way Out" (Live) (Elmore James, Marshall Sehorn, Sonny Boy Williamson II) – 4:58
14. "In Memory of Elizabeth Reed" (Dickey Betts) – 6:57
15. "Dreams" (Gregg Allman) – 7:19
16. "Whipping Post" (Gregg Allman) – 5:17
- Track 1 from At Fillmore East (1971), recorded live 3/1971 at the Fillmore East in New York, NY
- Tracks 2, 4, 6 and 11 from Brothers and Sisters (1973)
- Tracks 3, 10, 14 from Idlewild South (1970)
- Tracks 5, 7–8, 12–13 from Eat a Peach (1972), track 13 recorded live 6/27/1971 at the Fillmore East in New York, NY
- Track 9 from Enlightened Rogues (1979)
- Track 15–16 from The Allman Brothers Band (1969)

== Charts ==
Chart performance for A Decade of Hits 1969–1979
Chart (2017)	Peak position
US Billboard 200	39
