= Les Brers =

US rock band (2015–2017)

- Les Brers in 2016. (L-R): Marc Quiñones, Pat Bergeson, Bruce Katz, Oteil Burbridge, Butch Trucks, Jaimoe, Jack Pearson, Lamar Williams Jr.

Background information
- Also known as: Butch Trucks & Very Special Friends
- Origin: Jacksonville, FL, USA
- Genres: Rock, blues rock, Southern rock, jazz-rock, jam band
- Years active: 2015–2017
- Spinoff of: The Allman Brothers Band
- Past members: Jai Johanny "Jaimoe" Johanson; Marc Quiñones; Oteil Burbridge; Jack Pearson; Pat Bergeson; Bruce Katz; Lamar Williams Jr. Butch Trucks
- Website: lesbrersband.com

Les Brers was an American rock band formed in 2015 by former members of The Allman Brothers Band. They were initially led by drummer Butch Trucks. After his death on January 24, 2017, the band played their final show in August that year.

== History ==
Les Brers was formed in 2015, following the retirement of The Allman Brothers Band at the end of 2014. The origins are from a band led by Butch Trucks that was billed as Butch Trucks & Very Special Friends. This band performed at two festivals in 2015, the Peach Music Festival and Wanee Music Festival. The lineup at the Peach Festival was Butch Trucks and Jaimoe Johanson on drums, Marc Quiñones on percussion, Dave Yoke and Vaylor Trucks (son of Butch Trucks) on guitar, and Bruce Katz on keyboards. The lineup for the band at the Wanee Music Festival was Butch Trucks, Jaimoe Johanson, Marc Quiñones and Bruce Katz joined by Jack Pearson on lead and slide guitar/lead and backup vocals, Pat Bergeson on guitar, Oteil Burbridge on bass guitar, Bill Evans on saxophone and Lamar Williams Jr. (son of former Allman Brothers Band bassist Lamar Williams) on vocals.

Following the Peach Music Festival, Trucks announced plans to perform in 2016 with a band called "Les Brers". The band's name was taken from the Allman Brothers Band song "Les Brers in A Minor" off of their 1972 album Eat a Peach. It is a combination of French ("Les") and Southern American English ("Brers"), which translates to "The Brothers". This band's lineup consisted of the same lineup of Butch Trucks & Very Special Friends that performed at the 2015 Peach Music Festival without saxophonist Bill Evans (although Trucks stated that Evans would probably join the band for certain shows when his schedule allowed). Trucks, Johanson, Quiñones, Burbridge and Pearson were all former members of the Allman Brothers Band. They all performed together in the band between 1997 and 1999.

Les Brers performed two shows at the Cox Capitol Theatre in Macon, GA in 2016. They also performed at the 2016 Wanee Festival. During this performance, they were joined by former Allman Brothers Band guitarist Warren Haynes for some songs. They performed again at the 2016 Peach Music Festival and went on a short U.S. tour in September 2016.

The band primarily performed songs by the Allman Brothers Band along with some other blues and a few originals from non-Allman members.

After Butch Trucks died on January 24, 2017, the band announced they would play their final show in August that same year.

== Band members ==
- Butch Trucks - drums
- Jai Johanny "Jaimoe" Johanson - drums
- Marc Quiñones - percussion
- Oteil Burbridge - bass, backing vocals
- Jack Pearson - lead guitar, slide guitar, lead/backing vocals
- Pat Bergeson - guitar
- Bruce Katz - keyboards
- Lamar Williams Jr. - lead/backing vocals
