= An Evening with the Allman Brothers Band: First Set =

Live album by The Allman Brothers Band
- Released: June 9, 1992
- Recorded: December 1991, March 1992
- Studio: Mixing, Criteria Studios Miami Florida
- Genre: Southern rock
- Length: 74:10
- Label: Epic
- Producer: Tom Dowd

The Allman Brothers Band chronology
Live at Great Woods (1992)	An Evening with the Allman Brothers Band: First Set (1992)	Where It All Begins (1994)

Professional ratings
Review scores
Source	Rating
AllMusic	3.5/5 stars
Rolling Stone	3.5/5 stars
JazzMusicArchives	2/5 stars

An Evening with the Allman Brothers Band: First Set is the thirteenth album by the rock group the Allman Brothers Band. It was recorded live in December 1991 and March 1992, and released in 1992.

An Evening with the Allman Brothers Band: First Set was the first live Allman Brothers Band album, and their third album overall, to feature Warren Haynes on guitar and Allen Woody on bass. Haynes and Woody had joined the group when it reformed in 1989.

== Track listing ==
1. "End of the Line" (Gregg Allman, Warren Haynes, Allen Woody, John Jaworowicz) – 5:43
2. "Blue Sky" (Dickey Betts) – 8:39
3. "Get On with Your Life" (Gregg Allman) – 7:58
4. "Southbound" (Dickey Betts) – 7:52
5. "Midnight Blues" (Blind Willie McTell, Dickey Betts) – 5:14
6. "Melissa" (Gregg Allman, Steve Alaimo) – 5:28
7. "Nobody Knows" (Dickey Betts) – 15:37
8. "Dreams" (Gregg Allman) – 11:36
9. "Revival" (Dickey Betts) – 5:56

== Personnel ==
=== The Allman Brothers Band ===
- Gregg Allman – Hammond B-3 organ, piano, acoustic guitar, lead vocals
- Dickey Betts – lead and rhythm guitar, acoustic & acoustic slide guitar, lead vocals
- Jaimoe – drums, background vocals
- Butch Trucks – drums, tympani, background vocals
- Warren Haynes – lead, rhythm, and slide guitar, acoustic guitar, background vocals
- Allen Woody – bass, 5 string fretless bass, 18 string bass, acoustic bass, background vocals
- Marc Quinones – congas, percussion

=== Additional musicians ===
- Thom Doucette – harmonica

=== Production ===
- Produced by Tom Dowd
- Recorded and mixed by Jay Mark
- Chief engineer: David Hewitt
- Engineers: Phil Gitomer, Dave Roberts
- Remote Recording Services "Silver Truck"
- Second engineer: Andy Roshberg
- Mastered by Bob Ludwig
- Digital editing: Scott Hull

== Recording dates ==
- December 28 – 31, 1991 – Macon City Auditorium, Macon, Georgia
- March 3 – 4, 1992 – Orpheum Theatre, Boston, Massachusetts
  - The album cover shows the band in front of the Orpheum Theatre
- March 10 – 11, 1992 – Beacon Theatre, New York, New York

== Charts ==
Chart (1992)	Peak position
US Billboard 200	80

== See also ==
- An Evening with the Allman Brothers Band: 2nd Set
