= Where It All Begins =

Studio album by The Allman Brothers Band
- Released: May 3, 1994
- Recorded: January 1994
- Studio: BR Ranch Studios, Jupiter, Florida, US
- Genre: Southern rock; blues rock; country rock
- Length: 55:59
- Label: Sony Music / Epic Records
- Producer: Tom Dowd

The Allman Brothers Band chronology
An Evening with the Allman Brothers Band: First Set (1992)	Where It All Begins (1994)	An Evening with the Allman Brothers Band: 2nd Set (1995)

Where It All Begins is the eleventh studio album by the Allman Brothers Band. "No One to Run With" obtained the most album-oriented rock airplay, while "Soulshine", written by Warren Haynes, gained success as a concert and fan favorite. Gregg Allman also started to confront his substance abuse problems in the past on songs such as "All Night Train". The album sold considerably better than its predecessor, Shades of Two Worlds. In 1998, the album went Gold. Nevertheless, critical reception was weaker. This was also the last studio album the group recorded with original guitarist Dickey Betts, as well as their second album not to include an instrumental, after Brothers of the Road.

Producer Tom Dowd, in an effort to relieve Gregg Allman's dislike of recording in the studio, arranged for the band's full concert stage setup to be assembled in a Florida film soundstage owned by actor Burt Reynolds. This allowed the band to record all the songs for the album live as a unit instead of recording their parts individually.

Where It All Begins features the 1992 to 1997 lineup of the Allman Brothers Band – Gregg Allman on keyboards and vocals, Dickey Betts on guitar and vocals, Warren Haynes on guitar and vocals, Allen Woody on bass, Butch Trucks on drums, Jaimoe on drums, and Marc Quiñones on congas and percussion.

== Recording and production ==
Where It All Begins was recorded in January 1994 at a ranch owned by actor Burt Reynolds in Jupiter, Florida. In contrast to the band's usual recording methods, producer Tom Dowd arranged to have the band record the album live on a soundstage in order to alleviate the band's dislike of recording in the studio. "No One to Run With" was originally written by guitarist Dickey Betts alongside hometown friend John Prestia in the early 1980s. Warren Haynes' song "Soulshine" was recorded by the band and included on the album at the suggestion of Gregg Allman. Haynes also brought in another song, titled "Rockin' Horse", for the band to record with Allman on vocals. Haynes agreed to perform vocals on the song after Allman refused. The track was ultimately not included on the album due to objections by Betts, and replaced with "Mean Woman Blues" instead.

== Reception ==
Professional ratings
Review scores
Source	Rating
Allmusic	3/5 stars
The Music Box	4/5 stars
Rolling Stone	3/5 stars

The album received mixed to positive reviews from critics. Paul Evans of Rolling Stone described the album as "Twin leads, Two drummers, an impossibly soulful vocalist — no American band ever emerged with the sheer power of the Allmans. It's the tragedy of these terrific players that, ever since the long-ago deaths of Duane Allman and Berry Oakley, their albums have only echoed — clearly or confusedly — their original boom. This time out, Gregg's world-weary singing and guitarist Dickey Betts' country inclinations get subsumed too often in formula blooze. But there's no denying stellar jamming. Give the Brothers any obvious three-chord sequence, and they soar, spinning solos and building percussive thunder." Bruce Eder of AllMusic gave it 3 stars out of 5, noting "After a year of personal and personnel problems, the Allman Brothers Band got back together to record the surprisingly consistent live-in-the-studio venture Where It All Begins. It lacks the ambition and stretch of Seven Turns or Shades of Two Worlds, along with their peaks, but it is still a solidly consistent album, driven by some of the virtues of live spontaneity. Highlights include Gregg Allman's frank drug song "All Night Train," the Bo Diddley-beat-driven "No One to Run With," and the glorious dual-guitar workout "Back Where It All Begins." John Metzger of The Music Box gave it four stars out of 5, saying "One of the most notable albums to be released in the past month is the Allman Brothers Band's Where It All Begins. The group has had several solid studio efforts over the past few years with Shades of Two Worlds and Seven Turns. Its latest outing, however, easily blows these two away, and returns the Allman Brothers Band to its prime."

== Track listing ==
1. "All Night Train" (Gregg Allman, Warren Haynes, Chuck Leavell) – 4:04
2. "Sailin' 'Cross the Devil's Sea" (Allman, Haynes, Allen Woody, Jack Pearson) – 4:57
3. "Back Where It All Begins" (Dickey Betts) – 9:12
4. "Soulshine" (Warren Haynes) – 6:44
5. "No One to Run With" (Dickey Betts, John Prestia) – 5:59
6. "Change My Way of Living" (Dickey Betts) – 6:15
7. "Mean Woman Blues" (Dickey Betts) – 5:01
8. "Everybody's Got a Mountain to Climb" (Dickey Betts) – 4:01
9. "What's Done Is Done" (Gregg Allman, Allen Woody) – 4:09
10. "Temptation Is a Gun" (Gregg Allman, Jonathan Cain, Neal Schon) – 5:37

== Personnel ==
The Allman Brothers Band

- Gregg Allman – Hammond B-3 organ, piano, lead vocals
- Dickey Betts – lead and rhythm guitar, acoustic guitar, lead vocals
- Jaimoe – drums, percussion, background vocals
- Butch Trucks – drums, percussion, background vocals
- Warren Haynes – lead, rhythm, and slide guitar, lead and background vocals
- Allen Woody – bass, fretless bass, six-string bass, background vocals
- Marc Quiñones – congas, percussion

Production

- Produced by Tom Dowd
- Recording, mixing: Jay Mark
- Mastering: Vlado Meller
- Recording engineers: David Hewitt, Phil Gitomer, Sean McClintock
- Digital editing engineer: Andrew Roshberg

== Charts ==
Chart (1994)	Peak position
US Billboard 200	45

== Certifications ==
Region	Certification	Certified units/sales
United States (RIAA)	Gold	500,000^{^}
^{^} Shipments figures based on certification alone.
