= Hittin' the Note =

Studio album by The Allman Brothers Band
- Released: March 18, 2003
- Recorded: December 2001 & April 2002; Water Music, Hoboken, NJ
- Genre: Southern rock, blues rock, jam rock
- Length: 74:54
- Label: Sanctuary
- Producer: Michael Barbiero; Warren Haynes

The Allman Brothers Band chronology
American University 12/13/70 (2002)	Hittin' the Note (2003)	Live at the Beacon Theatre (2003)

Hittin' the Note is the twelfth and final studio album by American rock group the Allman Brothers Band. Released through Sanctuary Records, it is their only studio album to include both slide guitar player Derek Trucks and bass player Oteil Burbridge and marks the full-time return of guitar player Warren Haynes to the band. It is also their only studio album not to include original guitarist Dickey Betts.

The track "Instrumental Illness" was nominated for Best Rock Instrumental Performance at the 46th Annual Grammy Awards, losing to "Plan B" from Jeff by Jeff Beck.

== Background ==
The album was recorded live in the studio in New Jersey in December 2001 with lead vocal and minor overdubs recorded in early 2002. It was the first Allman recording co-produced by bandmember Haynes and Michael Barbiero. The album also marked the band's exit from Sony/Epic Records and was released jointly by Sanctuary Records and the band's Peach Records.

The album was met with critical acclaim but very limited radio airplay. Wall Street Journal, Allmusic, and Rolling Stone magazine each gave the record positive reviews. The track "Instrumental Illness" garnered two Grammy Award nominations in 2003 and 2004, both in the Best Rock Instrumental category.

Much of the record was written by the writing team of Gregg Allman and Warren Haynes. The band's history was not ignored: The structure of concert favorite "Desdemona" recalls that of "In Memory of Elizabeth Reed", while "High Cost of Low Living" features the guitarists quoting from other Allmans classics such as "Blue Sky", "Dreams", and "Mountain Jam". But the future is served too: The acoustic track "Old Friend" closes the album; including only Haynes and Derek Trucks, it is the only Allman Brothers Band track ever not to include an original member.

== Critical reception ==
Professional ratings
Review scores
Source	Rating
Allmusic	4.5/5 stars
The Music Box	3.5/5 stars
Rolling Stone	3/5 stars
PopMatters	(not rated)

On AllMusic, Thom Jurek wrote, "Hittin' the Note is the band's finest studio outing since Brothers and Sisters over 20 years before.... In sum, Hittin' the Note does exactly what its title claims – 11 tracks' worth and it burns on every one. This album is in-the-pocket, deep-grooving Allman Brothers Band blues-rock at its best."

In The Music Box, John Metzger said, "... the Allman Brothers Band has persevered and with the release of its new album Hittin' the Note, the group has found a way to return to greatness. True, the departure of [Dickey] Betts is still felt throughout the album. More often than not, however, the ensemble rips into its new batch of songs with such intense force that all but the most diehard Betts fans won’t care one bit."

In Rolling Stone, Parke Puterbaugh wrote, "These southern-rock road warriors' first studio album since 1994 is surprisingly solid: Returning guitarist Warren Haynes – the best axman to pass through the band since Duane Allman – plays with a steely, tensile power, while youngblood Derek Trucks... counterpoints with mellower, more even-keeled lines.... There's nothing radically new going on here, but the level of engagement is noteworthy."

Steven Hyden in PopMatters said, "It should go without saying that the playing on Hittin' the Note is uniformly excellent.... But if the songs are merely workmanlike, the easy roll and tumble of the ensemble playing is still highly enjoyable.... But there's a real warmth and sense of pleasure poring out of the laser-guided grooves here that comes from long-time mates locking into a groove and seeing where it takes them."

== Track listing ==
1. "Firing Line" (Gregg Allman, Warren Haynes) – 5:17
2. "High Cost of Low Living" (Allman, Haynes, Jeff Anders, Ronnie Burgin) – 7:52
3. "Desdemona" (Allman, Haynes) – 9:20
4. "Woman Across the River" (Bettye Crutcher, Allen Jones) – 5:51
5. "Old Before My Time" (Allman, Haynes) – 5:23
6. "Who to Believe" (Haynes, John Jaworowicz) – 5:38
7. "Maydell" (Haynes, Johnny Neel) – 4:35
8. "Rockin' Horse" (Allman, Haynes, Allen Woody, Jack Pearson) – 7:23
9. "Heart of Stone" (Mick Jagger, Keith Richards) – 5:06
10. "Instrumental Illness" (Haynes, Oteil Burbridge) – 12:17
11. "Old Friend" (Haynes, Chris Anderson) – 6:12

== Personnel ==
The Allman Brothers Band

- Gregg Allman – Hammond B-3 organ, piano, clavinet, lead vocals
- Butch Trucks – drums
- Jaimoe – drums
- Warren Haynes – lead, slide, acoustic, and acoustic slide guitars (left side), lead and background vocals
- Marc Quiñones – congas, percussion
- Oteil Burbridge – bass
- Derek Trucks – lead, slide, and acoustic slide guitars (right side)

Production

- Produced and mixed by Michael Barbiero and Warren Haynes
- Engineer: Michael Barbiero
- Assistant engineers: Reuben Kaller, Mike Scielzi
- Mastering: Greg Calbi
- Art direction, illustration: Hugh Syme
- Design: Linda Yue
- Photography: Danny Clinch, Dimo Safari, Kirk West

== Charts ==
Chart (2003)	Peak position
German Albums (Offizielle Top 100)	55
US Billboard 200	37
