= Soulshine (song) =

Song by The Allman Brothers Band

from the album Where It All Begins
- Released: March 1994
- Recorded: 1994
- Genre: Blues rock; Southern rock; soul blues
- Length: 6:44
- Label: Sony Music
- Songwriter: Warren Haynes
- Producer: Tom Dowd

"Soulshine" is a song written by American musician Warren Haynes and originally recorded by Larry McCray on his 1993 album, Delta Hurricane. It is best known as a recording that The Allman Brothers Band released on their 1994 album, Where It All Begins, featuring Gregg Allman on vocals.

Although the Allmans' version was never released as a single, it remained one of their best-known songs among fans and concertgoers. A live version of the song, which appeared on the Allmans' 2003 DVD, Live at the Beacon Theatre, had Allman and Haynes alternating vocals on the verses and harmonizing on the chorus, and includes a slide solo from Derek Trucks, as Dickey Betts was no longer with the band. This has become the standard for the song in most recent years with dual vocals.

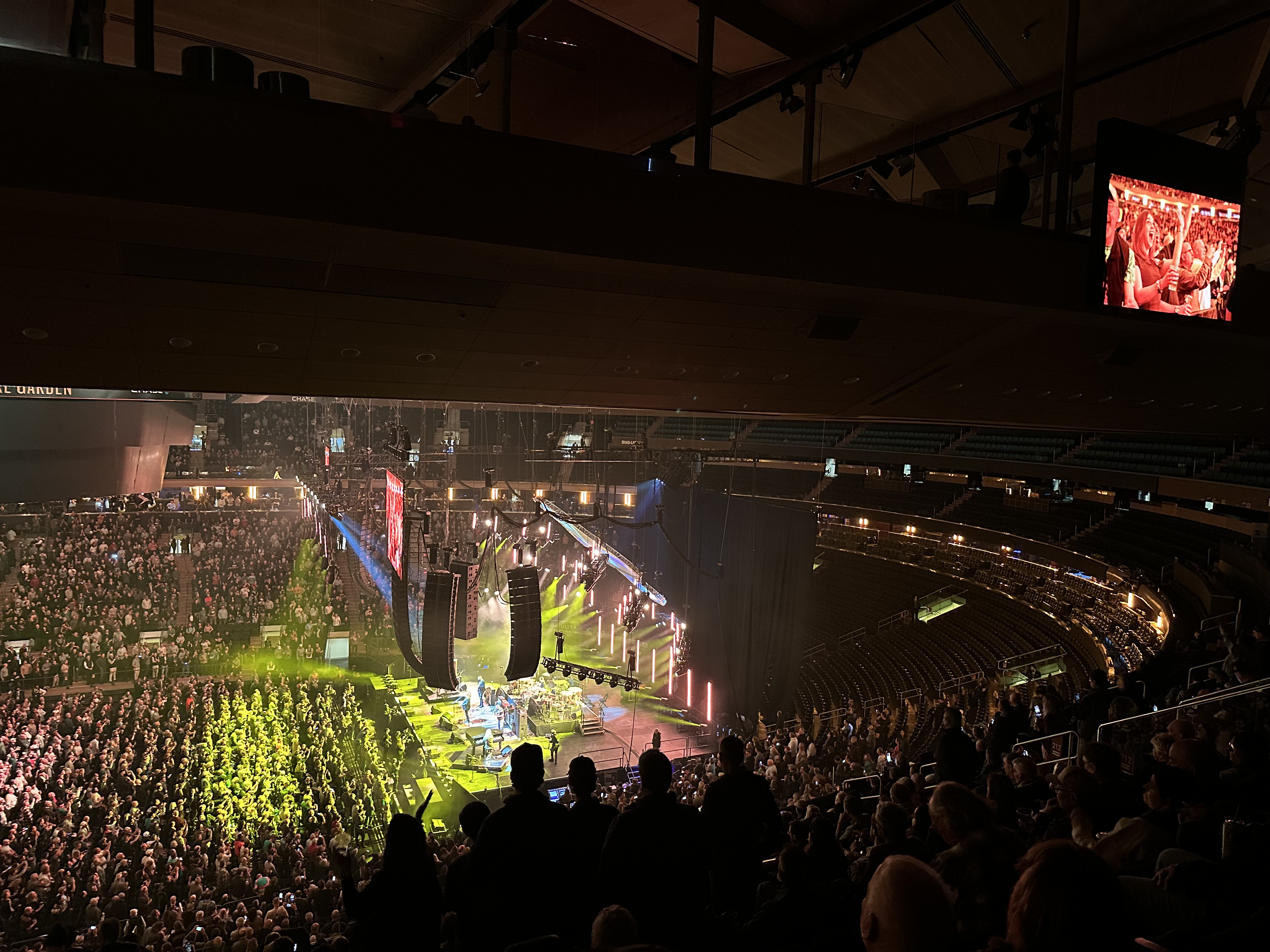
Led by Haynes, The Brothers performing "Soulshine" at Madison Square Garden in 2025

When Haynes and bassist Allen Woody formed Gov't Mule, they took the song with them. Gov't Mule performs "Soulshine" live at their concerts and it was included on the band's Live... With a Little Help from Our Friends, The Deep End, Volume 1, and The Deepest End, Live in Concert releases. The latter versions feature Willie Weeks and Dave Schools filling in on bass after Woody's death.

The song inspired the Soulshine benefit concert, which Haynes and Dave Matthews Band hosted at Madison Square Garden on November 24, 2024, to assist relief and recovery efforts in North Carolina and Florida following Hurricanes Helene and Milton.

== Other versions ==
Beth Hart recorded this song on her 2007 album, 37 Days.

The song was sung by two contestants from the thirteenth season of American Idol. C.J. Harris used it during his audition (and also in the Top 8) and Ben Briley performed the song during "Rush Week".

The 1997 David Allan Coe album Live: If That Ain't Country... has a performance of this song as the second track, since Haynes, Coe's original guitar player, joined him for that concert.
