= Hot 'Lanta =

Instrumental by the Allman Brothers Band

from the album At Fillmore East
- Released: July 1971
- Venue: Fillmore East, New York City
- Genre: Jazz rock; progressive rock
- Length: 5:17
- Label: Capricorn
- Songwriters: Duane Allman; Gregg Allman; Dickey Betts; Butch Trucks; Berry Oakley; Jai Johanny Johanson

At Fillmore East track listing
- 7 tracks: 1. "Statesboro Blues"; 2. "Done Somebody Wrong"; 3. "Stormy Monday"; 4. "You Don't Love Me"; 5. "Hot 'Lanta"; 6. "In Memory of Elizabeth Reed"; 7. "Whipping Post"

"Hot 'Lanta" is an instrumental piece performed by the Allman Brothers Band. It debuted on their live album At Fillmore East, released in July 1971, the fifth track on the album. "Hotlanta" is a nickname for Atlanta, Georgia.

== Composition ==
The song begins with a statement of the theme, followed by solos from Gregg Allman (organ), Duane Allman (guitar), and Dickey Betts (guitar). There is then a (duet) drum break, and then a restatement of the theme, which ends on a dissonant chord that fades into a drone of organ and intermittent snare drum rolls, then growing into a powerful crescendo accentuated by the timpani playing of drummer Butch Trucks.

The composition has elements in common with jazz rock and progressive rock.
