= Jessica (instrumental) =

1973 single by the Allman Brothers Band

Single by The Allman Brothers Band

from the album Brothers and Sisters
- B-side: "Come and Go Blues"
- Released: December 1973
- Recorded: December 1972
- Genre: Southern rock; country rock; instrumental rock
- Length: 7:28 (album version); 4:00 (single version)
- Label: Capricorn 0036
- Songwriter: Dickey Betts
- Producers: The Allman Brothers Band; Johnny Sandlin

The Allman Brothers Band singles chronology
"Ramblin' Man" (1973)	"Jessica" (1973)	"Nevertheless" (1975)

Official audio
- "Jessica" on YouTube

"Jessica" is an instrumental song by American rock band the Allman Brothers Band, released in December 1973 as the second single from the group's fourth studio album, Brothers and Sisters (1973). Written by guitarist Dickey Betts, the song is a tribute to gypsy jazz guitarist Django Reinhardt, in that it was designed to be played using only two fingers on the left hand.

Betts wrote the majority of "Jessica" at the band's farm in Juliette, Georgia. He named it after his daughter, Jessica Betts, who was an infant when it was released. She had bounced along to the song's rhythm, and Betts attempted to capture her attitude with its melody. He invited fellow guitarist Les Dudek over to collaborate on it, and Dudek performed the bridge. The arrangement was crafted prior to recording, which took place at Capricorn Sound Studios in Macon, Georgia.

Issued as a single following the immensely successful "Ramblin' Man", "Jessica" did not receive the same level of chart success. Despite this, it was featured at the time in rotations for the progressive rock and album-oriented rock radio formats, and became a staple for classic rock radio stations in the following decades.

Reviews have been widely positive. Many critics at the time called it a highlight of the album, and a 2006 Wall Street Journal article deemed it "a true national heirloom".

== Background ==
Songwriting always has some gray areas, because if someone plays a particular riff does that mean it's part of the song or part of the arrangement? We all contributed to the arrangement of the piece, but it was Dickey's song.

— Chuck Leavell on songwriting credits

After the untimely death of group leader Duane Allman in 1971, the Allman Brothers Band continued on, adding keyboardist Chuck Leavell. A year later when bassist Berry Oakley died early into recording Brothers and Sisters, Lamar Williams was brought in as his replacement. The addition of Leavell in particular changed the band's sound and direction, which has often been considered most evident on "Jessica". Guitarist Dickey Betts wrote the song at "the Farm," the Band's 432-acre (175 ha) "group hangout" in Juliette, Georgia. "I really need to have an image in my head before I can start writing an instrumental because otherwise it's too vague. I get an emotion or an idea I want to express and see what I can come up with," said Betts in 2014. "Jessica" was an attempt to write a song that could be played with just two fingers, in honor of gypsy jazz guitarist Django Reinhardt, who played with two left fingers due to severe burns. Betts had crafted the main melody of the song but became frustrated with its direction afterward. Jessica, Betts's baby daughter, crawled into the room and began bouncing to the music. "I started playing along, trying to capture musically the way she looked bouncing around the room," said Betts, who named the song after her.

According to session musician Les Dudek, he co-wrote "Jessica" but did not receive credit. Betts had invited him over for dinner, and instructed him to bring his acoustic guitar. They played the song together, and Betts became frustrated, as it went nowhere following the opening and main verse riff. According to Dudek, he formed the bridge section while Betts was away, checking on their steaks. Upon his return, Dudek showed him his new section. "Dickey lit up like a lightbulb he was so happy, because now we had the new section the song desperately needed," he remarked. The two hopped in Betts's pickup truck with their guitars in excitement, with intentions to show each band member their new instrumental. "I'll never forget, right when we got in Dickey's truck, it started to lightly, almost mystically, snow, as if it was Duane sending us a message: 'Hey, you guys finally got that tune.'"

"Jessica"
The song's main melody consists of two keyboards and Betts's electric guitar harmonizing.

The band had laid down tracks for "three or four" recordings for Brothers and Sisters when Betts brought "Jessica" to the studio. Dudek accompanied Betts on guitar, in order to illustrate both the rhythm guitar and the melody. Leavell noted the song presented a challenge, since earlier band instrumentals were more serious in nature: "How do we make this a little more intense and make it work as an Allman Brothers song?" Dudek had worked out harmonies with Betts and believed he would be recording with Betts, but Betts dissuaded him, noting that he had already played harmonies on "Ramblin' Man" and that critics might believe him to be in the band if he played harmonies on "Jessica". Dudek instead played the acoustic rhythm guitar, while Leavell played harmonies on piano. "I was very disappointed, but there was nothing I could say about it," said Dudek later. The song would wind up with two keyboards and one guitar. In the studio, the musicians worked on the song's arrangement, which took six days. Leavell created the transition between the piano and guitar solos. Betts later likened the song's creation to architecture, noting that it is "meticulously constructed, and every aspect has its place."

Leavell disagreed with the notion that Dudek co-wrote the song, noting that Betts created the melody of the song and its rhythm. In contrast, Dudek claims Betts walked with him into manager Phil Walden's office, demanding he receive songwriting royalties for Jessica. "I didn't understand all that exactly at the time, but in retrospect, I should have got 50 percent. Because it wasn't a completed song until I gave him the bridge section, the part that goes to the G chord," remembered Dudek. Drummer Butch Trucks questioned Dudek's account, noting that they all spent time crafting the arrangement. "I wasn't there, so I can't say what Les did or didn't do, but I take that with a grain of salt. Look at the track records of what each of them has written besides Jessica. I think it could be a group credit almost, and if any one person would have a writing claim it would be Chuck Leavell, who added a tremendous amount to 'Jessica'," said Trucks. Leavell acknowledged this: "I could say I co-wrote it, because I made a lot of suggestions, but I don't think that's fair." After Dudek left Capricorn Records to tour with the Steve Miller Band, he was let out of his contract, which involved no credits on the publishing deal for Brothers and Sisters. He maintains that Betts apologized to him about "the whole 'Jessica' thing" years later, claiming Capricorn said they did not have to pay him.

== Composition ==
The tune is in the key of A major, with the main guitar solo using the key of D major. The signature melody line, as with all of Dickey Betts' instrumental compositions, is played harmonically among various instruments, in this case, Betts taking the melody on guitar, Chuck Leavell playing the top harmony line on the Fender Rhodes electric piano, and Gregg Allman playing the bottom harmony line on the Hammond organ. Leavell also plays grand piano on this tune, playing a solo, for over a minute, from around the 2:30 mark. The acoustic guitar is played by Les Dudek.

The original version on Brothers and Sisters clocks in at 7:30, although there is a shortened single edit, which cuts out some of the main theme at the end of the piece, trimming it to 4:00 exactly. This version is the one heard on most classic rock radio stations, and any kind of various artist compilation on which "Jessica" has been featured. However, most Allman Brothers compilations use the full 7:30 version.

== Reception ==
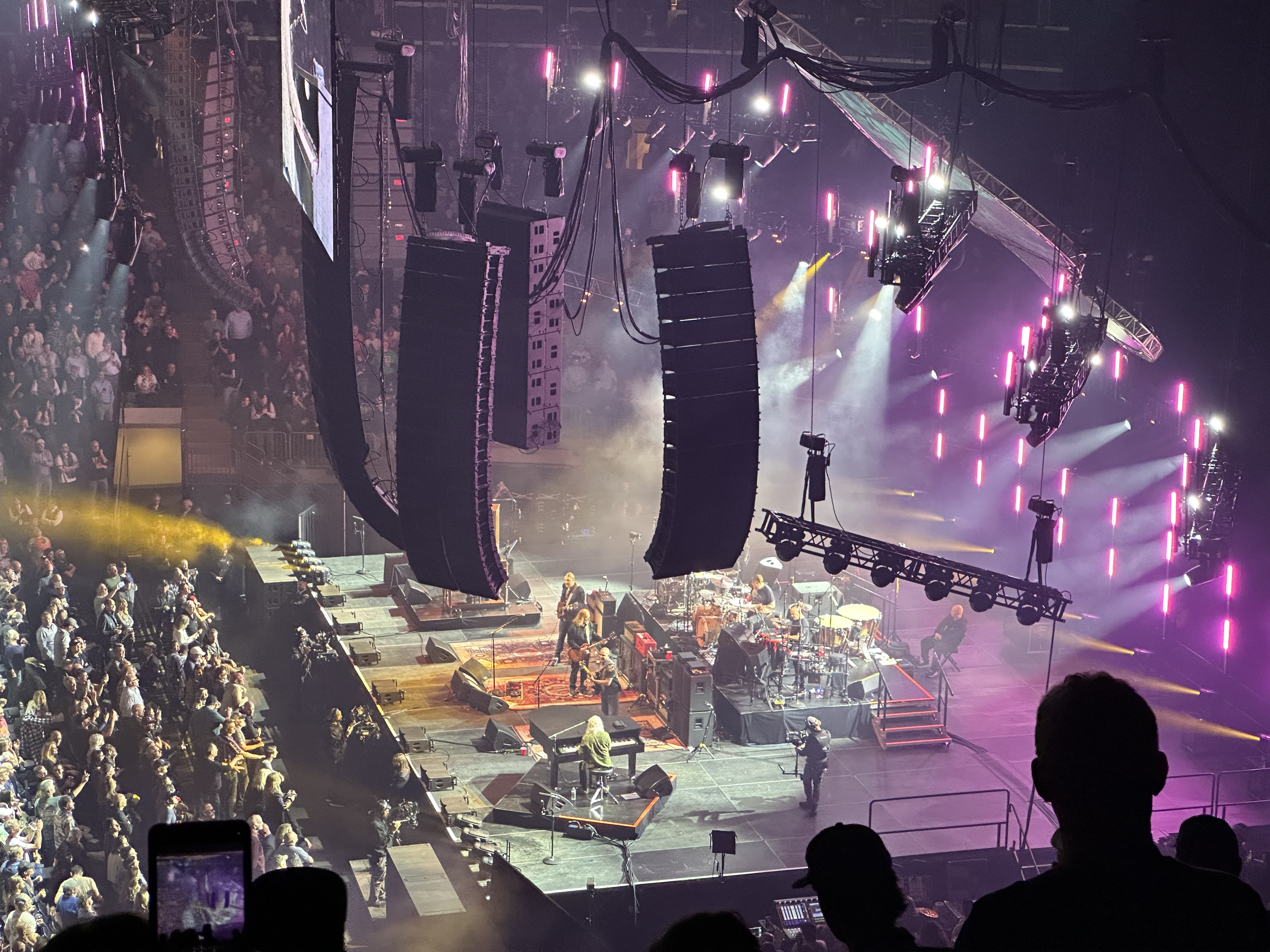
The Allman Brothers, featuring Leavell on piano, performing "Jessica" at a special concert at Madison Square Garden in New York City

The song rose the highest on Billboard's Easy Listening chart, where it peaked at number 29 on March 9, 1974. "Jessica" reached no higher than number 65 on the Hot 100. However, it was one of the tracks from the Brothers and Sisters album that was often played on stations employing the progressive rock or album-oriented rock radio formats. "Jessica" later became a staple of classic rock radio.

=== Critical response ===
Initial reviews of the song in 1973 were very positive. Bud Scoppa of Rolling Stone wrote, "To my ears, this is the most effective instrumental the Allmans have ever recorded: It breaks the band's recent tendency toward humorlessness while demonstrating vividly that this group can elaborate brilliantly on a motif without once falling into obvious blues or rock & roll patterns." Billboard singled it out as one of the "best cuts" from the album, and it was mentioned as a highlight by Janis Schacht of Circus. "The jazzy sound is not only effective, it's aesthetically beautiful. Chuck Leavell's piano work is much on a par with Nicky Hopkins' work for the Rolling Stones. It moves, it boogies, it carries the piece along with incredible style and is met halfway by Dickie Betts' clean, sweeping guitar lead."

A January 2006 Wall Street Journal article referred to the piece as "a true national heirloom."

A later, live recording of "Jessica" is included on the 1995 An Evening with the Allman Brothers Band: 2nd Set. It won a Grammy Award for Best Rock Instrumental Performance at the 38th Annual Grammy Awards in 1996.

== Personnel ==
Per album liner notes

- Richard Betts – lead guitar
- Gregg Allman – organ
- Lamar Williams – bass
- Chuck Leavell – piano and electric piano
- Les Dudek – acoustic guitar
- Butch Trucks – drums, tympani and percussion
- Jai Johanny Johanson – drums and congas

== Chart performance ==
Chart (1973–1974)	Peak position
Canada Top Singles (RPM)	35
Canada Adult Contemporary (RPM)	68
Netherlands (Dutch Top 40)	29
US Billboard Hot 100	65
US Easy Listening (Billboard)	29

== Cover versions ==
- The alternative rock group They Might Be Giants did a cover version of the tune, which was released on their 1993 EP Why Does the Sun Shine? (The Sun Is a Mass of Incandescent Gas).
- Country band Shenandoah does a cover of Jessica at the end of their hit song "I Got You".
- Chuck Leavell continues to perform it as a piano-based piece, as with his version on the album Southscape.
- Jazz fusion band Dixie Dregs also covered the song on their album California Screamin, released in 2000, also used as theme song for Top Gear Indonesia on RTV & Philippines on ABS-CBN.
- The BBC series Top Gear features a version of the tune as its opening theme.
- Hank Marvin did a cover version of the tune on his 1992 album Into the Light.
- On the final broadcast of Top Gear Series 18 on BBC Two on 11 March 2012, Slash played an alternative version of the theme at the show's ending.
- The Spanish group Pata Negra featured a cover of the song in their album Rock Gitano.

== In media and popular culture ==
The tune is also well known as the opening theme to the original BBC TV show Top Gear and for the 2002 format of the series, albeit a modernised cover version. In one episode, James May recreated the tune using nothing but exhaust notes from several cars (Series 6, Episode 11), while in another episode the tune in its full version was heard to be played over the radio when the three presenters tested in America (Series 12, Episode 2). At the end of the last episode of the 18th series of the show, Guns N' Roses guitarist Slash played his version of the tune. "Jessica" is also used for most international versions of Top Gear, including the US version, which used it as its theme only during the first season.

The tune was also featured in the movies Field of Dreams, Did You Hear About the Morgans?, Fear and Lassie, and was used as the opening theme tune for the Dr. Dean Edell radio show. It was also used throughout the 2000s on The Weather Channel as background music for the Local on the 8s.

The song was also featured as a playable track in the 2006 video game Guitar Hero 2

== Notes ==
=== Sources ===
- Paul, Alan (2014). One Way Out: The Inside History of the Allman Brothers Band. St. Martin's Press. ISBN 978-1250040497.
- Freeman, Scott (1996). Midnight Riders: The Story of the Allman Brothers Band. Little, Brown and Company. ISBN 978-0316294522.
- Poe, Randy (2008). Skydog: The Duane Allman Story. Backbeat Books. ISBN 978-0879309398.
- Allman, Gregg; Light, Alan (2012). My Cross to Bear. William Morrow. ISBN 978-0062112033.
