= Shades of Two Worlds =

Studio album by The Allman Brothers Band
- Released: July 2, 1991
- Recorded: April 1991 at Ardent Recording, Memphis, TN
- Genres: Southern rock, blues rock
- Length: 52:35
- Label: Epic
- Producer: Tom Dowd

The Allman Brothers Band chronology
Seven Turns (1990)	Shades of Two Worlds (1991)	A Decade of Hits 1969–1979 (1991)

Shades of Two Worlds is the tenth studio album by the Allman Brothers Band. Among the tracks are several longer songs of varying genres: the rock song "Nobody Knows"; jazzy instrumental "Kind of Bird"; and the blues-rocker "Get On with Your Life". Dickey Betts wrote or co-wrote five of the eight songs. Newer member Warren Haynes also has co-writing credits on five songs, while namesake Gregg Allman is only credited on two songs. There is also a Delta Blues cover of Robert Johnson's "Come On in My Kitchen". It is the band's first album to feature percussionist Marc Quiñones.

The instrumental track "Kind of Bird" was nominated for a Grammy Award for Best Rock Instrumental Performance at the 34th Annual Grammy Awards in 1992, but it lost to "Cliffs of Dover" by Eric Johnson.

== Critical reception ==
Professional ratings
Review scores
Source	Rating
AllMusic	4.5/5 stars
The Encyclopedia of Popular Music	3/5 stars
Rolling Stone	4/5 stars

AllMusic's Bruce Eder wrote: "The group's follow-up to their comeback album is a major step forward, with more mature songs, more improvisation than the group had featured in their work since the early '70s, and more confidence than they'd shown since Brothers and Sisters."

In Rolling Stone John Swenson wrote, "Charged by topflight performances from Dickey Betts and Gregg Allman, the band summons up both the spirit and the musical resonance of the original group.... [Warren Haynes] references [Duane] Allman's tone and signature techniques yet animates his presentation with his own distinct personality."

== Track listing ==
1. "End of the Line" (Gregg Allman, Warren Haynes, Allen Woody, John Jaworowicz) – 4:38
2. "Bad Rain" (Dickey Betts, Warren Haynes) – 5:33
3. "Nobody Knows" (Dickey Betts) – 10:58
4. "Desert Blues" (Dickey Betts, Warren Haynes) – 5:02
5. "Get On with Your Life" (Gregg Allman) – 6:58
6. "Midnight Man" (Dickey Betts, Warren Haynes) – 4:39
7. "Kind of Bird" (Dickey Betts, Warren Haynes) – 8:26
8. "Come On in My Kitchen" (Robert Johnson, arranged by Dickey Betts) – 6:18

== Personnel ==
The Allman Brothers Band

- Gregg Allman – Hammond B-3 organ, piano, lead vocals
- Dickey Betts – lead and rhythm guitar, acoustic guitar, acoustic slide guitar on "Come On in My Kitchen", lead vocals
- Jaimoe – drums, percussion, background vocals
- Butch Trucks – drums, percussion, background vocals
- Warren Haynes – lead, rhythm, and slide guitar, acoustic guitar, National steel body guitar on "Come On in My Kitchen", background vocals
- Allen Woody – bass guitar, acoustic bass
- Marc Quiñones – congas, percussion

Production

- Produced by Tom Dowd and the Allman Brothers Band
- Engineering: Jay Mark, Jeff Powell, Bud Snyder
- Mixing: Jay Mark
- Mastering: Vlado Meller
- Art direction: Michael Caplan

== Charts ==
Chart (1991)	Peak position
Canada Top Albums/CDs (RPM)	78
Swiss Albums (Schweizer Hitparade)	37
US Billboard 200	85
