= Little Martha =

1972 song by Allman Brothers Band

Song by The Allman Brothers Band

from the album Eat A Peach
- Released: 1972
- Recorded: 1971
- Genre: Folk
- Length: 2:07
- Label: Capricorn
- Songwriter: Duane Allman
- Producer: Tom Dowd

"Little Martha" is an acoustic guitar song composed by Duane Allman, which appeared as the final studio track on the Allman Brothers Band's fourth album, Eat a Peach, released in 1972. It was the Band's only track written solely by group leader and lead guitarist Allman. The track was recorded in October 1971, a few weeks before Duane Allman's death in a motorcycle accident.

Allman's original recording of the song is a bouncy fingerstyle instrumental duet with minimal accompaniment. Allman and bandmate Dickey Betts played the tune on 6-string guitars using open E tuning, Allman using a Dobro resonator guitar on lead, and Betts playing rhythm on a flat-top guitar. The song's simple melody and rhythmic counterpoint quickly made it a favorite among fans; acoustic guitar virtuoso Leo Kottke, who often covered the song in performance, once called it "the most perfect guitar song ever written."

== Song origin ==
The story goes that Allman had a dream where Jimi Hendrix showed him the melody of the tune in a Holiday Inn motel bathroom, using the sink faucet as a guitar fretboard. Remembering the melody during the October 1971 sessions that produced most of the third side of what would become Eat a Peach, Allman laid down the track, joined only by Dickey Betts and bassist Berry Oakley, though Oakley's part would be mixed out of the final version, leaving the number as a duet for the two guitarists. (Oakley's part would be restored on the 1989 box set Dreams.)

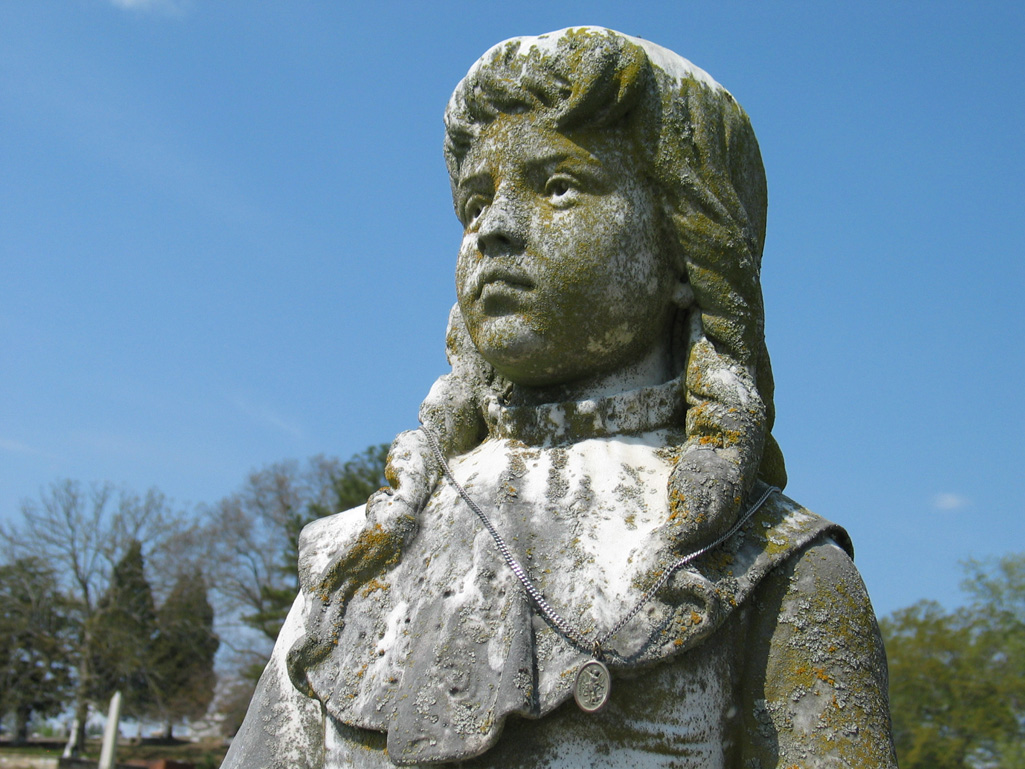
Statue of Martha Ellis in Rose Hill Cemetery

It is commonly believed that the song's namesake was Martha Ellis, a twelve-year-old girl whose statue the Allman Brothers Band most likely came across during their frequent trips to Rose Hill Cemetery in their homebase of Macon, Georgia. However, as with Dickey Betts' 1970 instrumental "In Memory of Elizabeth Reed", the song seems to have been named for one person, while actually being about someone else. "Little Martha" was envisioned by Allman as an ode to his then-girlfriend Dixie Meadows. He had given her the pet name of Martha because of the vintage clothing she sometimes wore – Duane saying "you look like Martha Washington." After Allman's death, Meadows sued unsuccessfully for control of his estate.

Duane Allman, Berry Oakley, and Gregg Allman were all subsequently buried at Rose Hill.

== Legacy ==
Both Gregg Allman and Dickey Betts have included "Little Martha" on live albums. The original studio version can be heard faintly on the PA system after the closing track, "Will The Circle Be Unbroken" on Allman's 1974 effort, The Gregg Allman Tour. It was also interwoven into bassist Oteil Burbridge's bass solos during certain live shows in the late 1990s by The Allman Brothers Band. Pickin' On The Allman Brothers: A Bluegrass Tribute contains a 3:40 min version of "Little Martha" "Little Martha" appears in a wildly different electric version as the opening track to Dickey Betts' 2004 limited-release live album, Instant Live At The Odeon. Guitarist Mac McAnally, a 10 time Country Music Association musician of the year and a long time member of The Coral Reefer Band, Jimmy Buffett's backing band, often plays Little Martha solo during an interlude in the main show. "Little Martha" was recorded by Leo Kottke on his 1986 album "A Shout Toward Noon/Leo Kottke".
