= No One to Run With =

Single by The Allman Brothers Band

from the album Where It All Begins
- Released: May 1994
- Genre: Country rock, Southern rock
- Length: 6:00
- Songwriters: Dickey Betts, John Prestia

The Allman Brothers Band singles chronology
"Back Where It All Begins" (1994)	"No One to Run With" (1994)	"Firing Line" (2003)

"No One to Run With" is a song written by Dickey Betts and John Prestia and performed by The Allman Brothers Band. It was originally written around 1982, and then recorded as a demo by the group Betts, Hall, Leavell and Trucks around 1983. That group was unable to find a recording contract, and it would be over a decade before the song was rediscovered and recorded by the Allman Brothers.

The song reached No. 7 on the U.S. mainstream rock chart in 1994. The song appeared on their 1994 album, Where It All Begins, and on the soundtrack to the 1994 film The Cowboy Way. The song features the Bo Diddley beat. The song was featured in an episode of the TV show King of the Hill.
