= Trouble No More (song) =

Blues song recorded by Muddy Waters in 1955

Single by Muddy Waters
- B-side: "Sugar Sweet"
- Released: 1955–1956
- Recorded: Chicago, November 3, 1955
- Genre: Blues
- Length: 2:40
- Label: Chess
- Songwriter: McKinley Morganfield a.k.a. Muddy Waters (credited)

Muddy Waters singles chronology
"Mannish Boy" (1955)	"Trouble No More" (1955)	"Forty Days and Forty Nights" (1956)

"Trouble No More" is an upbeat blues song first recorded by Muddy Waters in 1955. It is a variation on "Someday Baby Blues", recorded by Sleepy John Estes in 1935. The Allman Brothers Band recorded both studio and live versions of the song in the late 1960s and 1970s.

== Background ==
Several blues musicians have interpreted and recorded variations on "Someday Baby Blues". "Muddy Waters calls his 'Trouble No More' and Big Maceo titled his 'Worried Life Blues'. Be that as it may ... they all derive from Sleepy John Estes' 1935 classic 'Someday Baby Blues'."

As he did with "Rollin' Stone", "Rollin' and Tumblin'", "Walkin' Blues", and "Baby, Please Don't Go", Waters took an older country blues and made it into a Chicago blues. Waters also modified the lyrics, using "Someday baby, you ain't gonna trouble, poor me anymore" instead of Estes' "Someday baby, you ain't gonna worry, my mind anymore" (Estes' 1938 version "New Someday Baby" uses "trouble" in place of "worry;" Bob Dylan's 2006 "Someday Baby" uses "trouble, poor me anymore").

== Recording and releases ==
On November 3, 1955, Waters recorded "Trouble No More" in Chicago with Jimmy Rogers on electric guitar, Little Walter on amplified harmonica, Otis Spann on piano, Willie Dixon on bass, and Francis Clay on drums. Sometimes known as the "Headhunters", a loose group of fellow Chess recording artists, they were instrumental in defining Chicago blues.

Chess Records released the song as a single, with "Sugar Sweet" as the second side. Both songs appeared on the Billboard R&B charts, with "Trouble No More" reaching number seven. The tune is included on several compilations of Waters' Chess singles, such as The Anthology: 1947–1972 (2001). It was also used as the title track for the Chess's collection Trouble No More: Singles (1955–1959) (1989).

== Other renditions ==
The Allman Brothers Band recorded their arrangement of "Trouble No More" for their debut album The Allman Brothers Band (1969). A 1971 live recording of the song from the Fillmore East was included on Eat a Peach (1972). In an album review, Stephen Thomas Erlewine commented, "They're at the best on the punchier covers of "One Way Out" and "Trouble No More", both proof of the group's exceptional talents as a roadhouse blues-rock band."
