= Marc Quiñones =

American percussionist

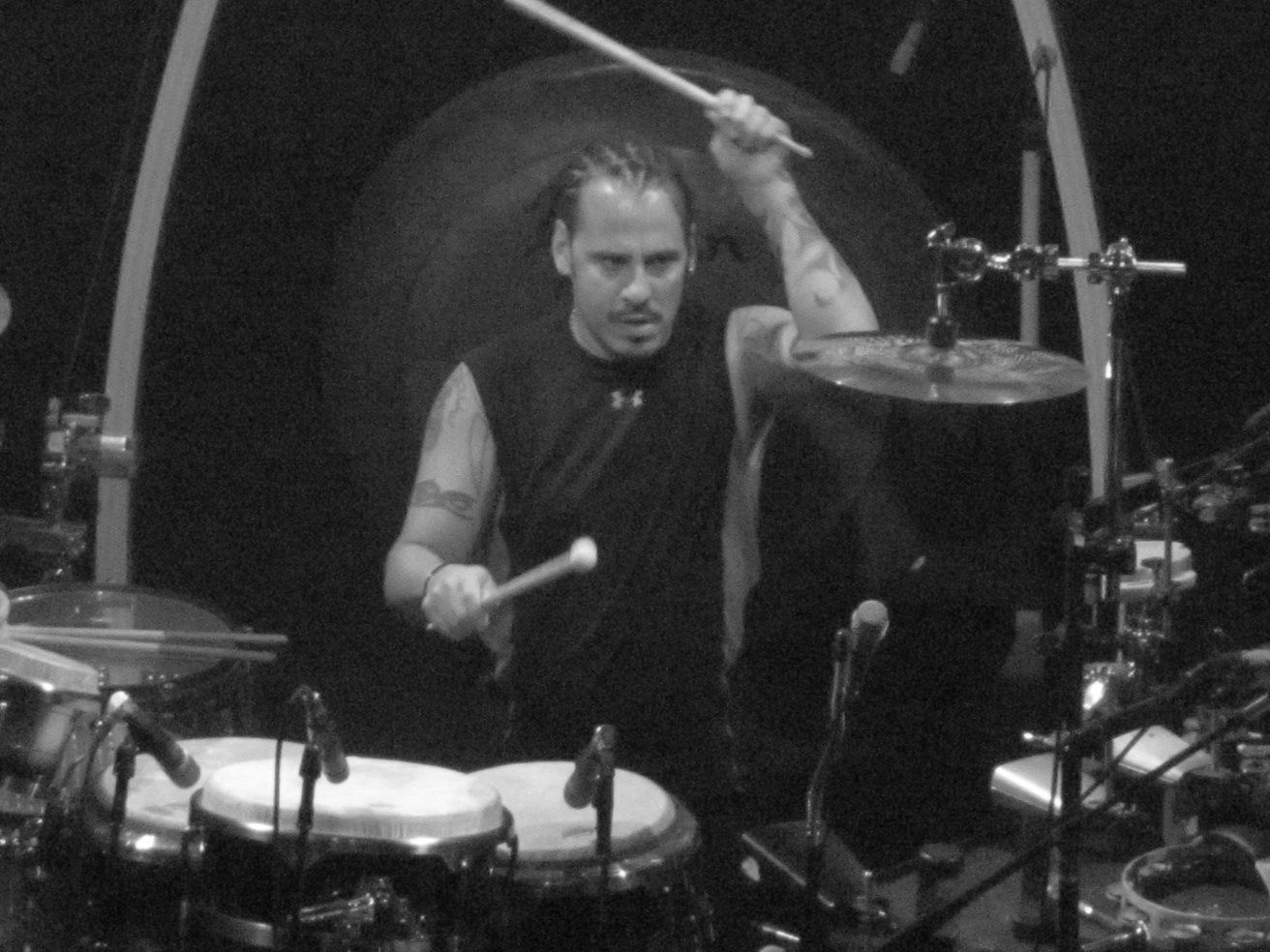
- Quiñones with The Allman Brothers Band in 2011.

Background information
- Born: December 29, 1963 (age 62); The Bronx, New York, United States
- Genres: Southern rock, salsa, Latin music, jazz fusion, new wave
- Occupations: Musician, producer
- Instruments: Percussion, drums
- Years active: 1979–present
- Label: Columbia
- Member of: Doobie Brothers
- Formerly of: The Allman Brothers Band

Marc Quiñones is a percussionist, a longtime player in salsa music, a former member of the Southern rock group The Allman Brothers Band (1991–2014) and the Gregg Allman Band. He is of Puerto Rican ancestry.

Born in The Bronx, New York, he began playing drums and congas at the age of three and was playing professionally at the age of nine. In his youth he played timbales with Latin music stars such as Tito Puente and co-founded a group named Los Rumberitos. At the age of 17 he joined the salsa music band of Rafael de Jesús.

Quiñones spent the next five years in salsa master Willie Colón's band, playing every percussion instrument at one time or another. His ability to sight-read music led to his becoming musical director of the band for the last two years; he also co-produced one of Colon's albums. He then spent two years playing with Rubén Blades as well as playing on and touring for David Byrne's Latin music Rei Momo project. In 1989 Quiñones joined the jazz fusion band Spyro Gyra where he played for two years.

After a chance meeting with Butch Trucks in 1991, he was recruited to join The Allman Brothers Band. There he played alongside original drummers Trucks and Jai Johanny "Jaimoe" Johanson; the general pattern was that Trucks was the timekeeper, Johanson added colors, and Quiñones established rhythms that the guitarists played against. His twenty-three year tenure with the band is the longest outside of the original members that survived into the 2000s.

When the Allman Brothers Band were not active, Quiñones played with various salsa bands and works as a session musician for albums (such as Marc Anthony's 2001 Libre), and creating music scores for television soundtracks, and commercials. Following the Allman Brothers Band's breakup at the end of 2014, Quiñones joined the Gregg Allman Band as well as Les Brers, a part time band led by original Allman Brothers band drummer Butch Trucks, that also consisted of other Allman Brothers alumni.

Quiñones joined the Doobie Brothers as a touring percussionist in May 2018.
