= Jaimoe =

American drummer and percussionist (born 1944)

Jai Johanny Johanson
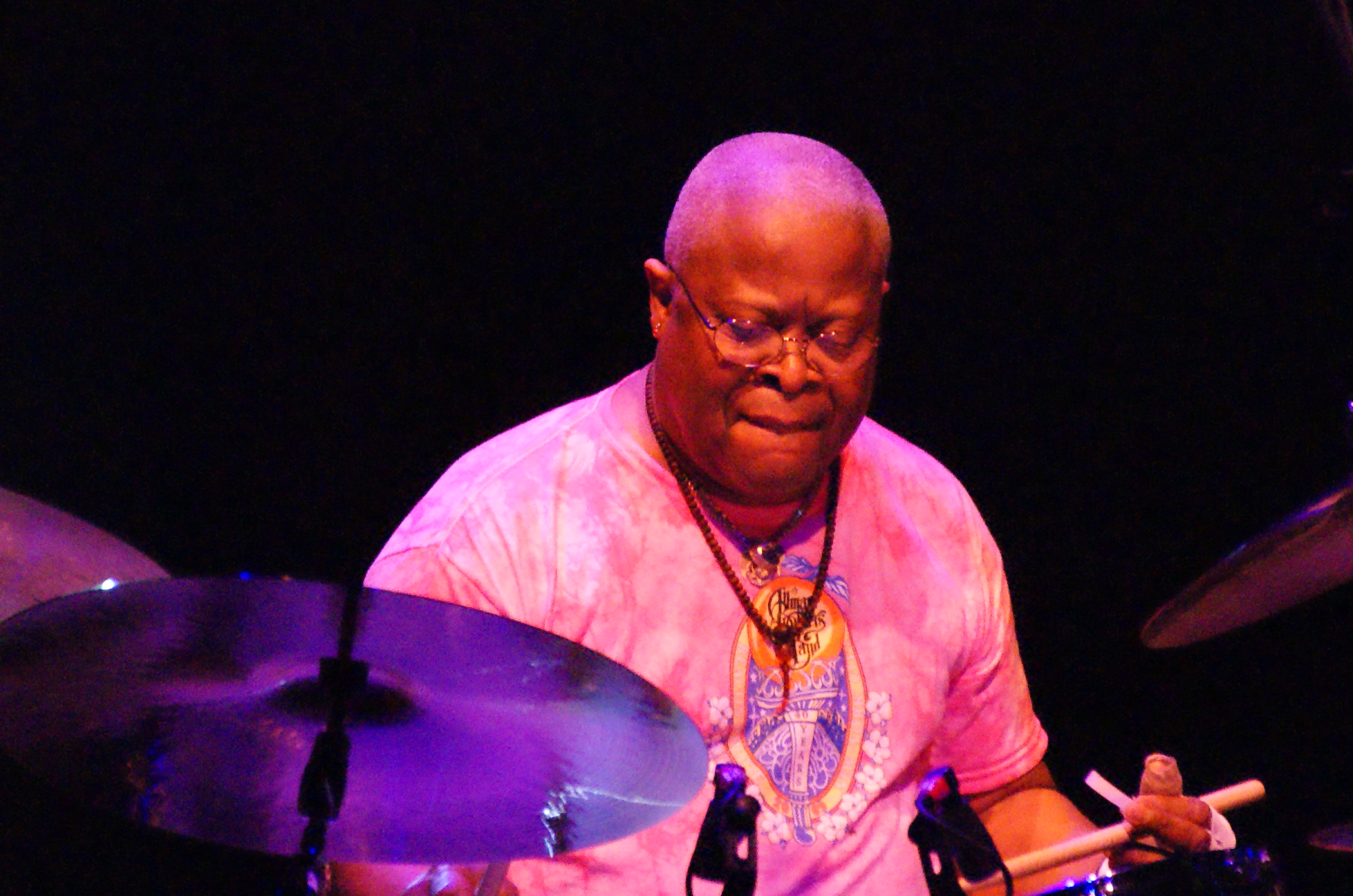
- Jaimoe performing with The Allman Brothers Band in 2009

Background information
- Also known as: Jaimoe; Johnny Lee Johnson
- Born: John Lee Johnson; July 8, 1944 (age 82); Ocean Springs, Mississippi, U.S.
- Genres: Blues rock; jam band; Southern rock; jazz
- Occupation: Musician
- Instruments: Drums, percussion
- Years active: 1966–present
- Labels: Capricorn; Arista; Polydor; Epic; Sony; Sanctuary
- Member of: Jaimoe's Jasssz Band
- Formerly of: The Allman Brothers Band, Sea Level, Les Brers

John Lee Johnson (born July 8, 1944), frequently known by the stage names Jai Johanny Johanson and Jaimoe, is an American drummer and percussionist. He is best known as one of the founding members of the Allman Brothers Band. He is the last surviving original member of the band.

Johanson played with a number of Muscle Shoals and Memphis soul acts in the early-to-mid 1960s, such as Otis Redding and Sam and Dave, as a session and touring drummer. While recording and touring he would meet the various members of what would become the Allman Brothers Band. One of the few bands at the time to employ two drummers, alongside Butch Trucks, they drew on R&B, blues, jazz, country, and rock to create a unique variety of southern rock. Upon the death of founding bassist Berry Oakley in 1972, Johanson brought in frequent collaborator Lamar Williams to replace him.

While on hiatus from the Allman Brothers Band in the late 1970s, he formed the band Sea Level around a core of former Allman Brothers Band members including Williams and pianist/vocalist Chuck Leavell. He briefly rejoined the Allman Brothers in 1979, but left again in 1980 due to back problems, and spent much of the 1980s playing in local Macon, Georgia-area bands. He rejoined the Allman Brothers Band in 1989, as the band transitioned from a southern rock sound to a more jam band feel, having added a third drummer/percussionist Marc Quiñones. The band continued to perform until formally retiring in 2014.

Johanson has since fronted his own jazz outfit, Jaimoe's Jasssz Band, and appeared with former Allman Brothers Band members for one-off reunions and in a number of different side projects. Along with the other members of the Allman Brothers Band, Johanson was inducted into the Rock and Roll Hall of Fame in 1995.

== Biography ==
Born John Lee Johnson in Ocean Springs, Mississippi on July 8, 1944, he came up in the R&B world and began drumming at an early age, often accompanied by friend Lamar Williams on bass. Johanson backed soul singers, including a membership in Otis Redding's touring band in 1966, and afterward touring with the acclaimed soul duo, Sam & Dave.

According to The Wall Street Journal, Jaimoe's "passion for jazz helped form the nascent Allman Brothers Band's improvisational approach, which incorporated blues, country and Western swing into a unique musical approach that nodded toward the Grateful Dead's West Coast explorations but never became as loosey-goosey."

After touring in late 1971 and early- to mid-1972 as a five-piece band, the group added keyboardist Chuck Leavell to their lineup, and began recording their fifth album. After recording only a handful of tracks, however, Berry Oakley was also killed in a motorcycle accident mere blocks from where Duane Allman had been struck. Lamar Williams, a bass guitarist who was a friend of Johansen, became a member of the group in the wake of Oakley's death. The album that resulted, 1973's Brothers and Sisters, added more of a country feel to their trademark sound and went gold within two days of shipping, spending five weeks as the number one album on the Billboard chart. The Dickie Betts penned "Ramblin' Man" from it broke hard rock barriers and became a hit on AM stations nationwide, giving the group their only hit single and rising to number two on the Billboard Hot 100. Just prior to the release of the album, they were the featured act at the largest one-day rock concert in American history, in 1973 Summer Jam at Watkins Glen, complemented by the Grateful Dead and The Band as support acts.

In 1995, Jaimoe and the other founding members of the Allman Brothers Band were inducted into the Rock and Roll Hall of Fame.

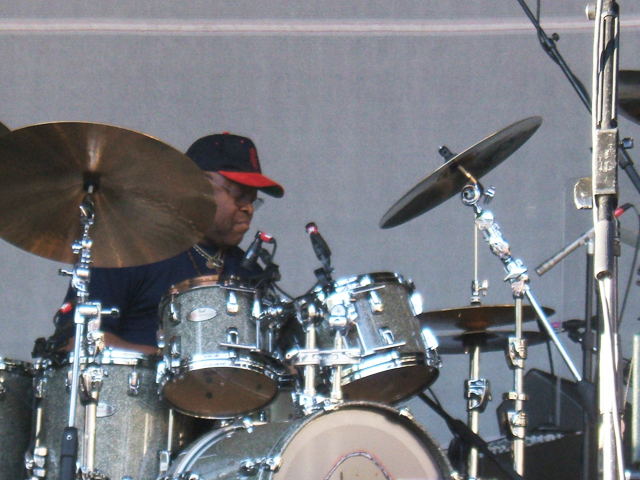
Mountain Jam 2009, May 31, 2009

Following the death of Dickey Betts on April 18, 2024, Jaimoe became the last surviving original member of the Allman Brothers Band.

== Jai Johanny Johanson discography ==
=== The Allman Brothers Band ===
- The Allman Brothers Band (1969)
- Idlewild South (1970)
- At Fillmore East (1971)
- Eat a Peach (1972)
- Brothers and Sisters (1973)
- Win, Lose or Draw (1975)
- Wipe the Windows, Check the Oil, Dollar Gas (1976)
- Enlightened Rogues (1979)
- Reach for the Sky (1980)
- Seven Turns (1990)
- Shades of Two Worlds (1991)
- An Evening with the Allman Brothers Band: First Set (1992)
- Where It All Begins (1994)
- An Evening with the Allman Brothers Band: 2nd Set (1995)
- Peakin' at the Beacon (2000)
- Hittin' the Note (2003)

=== Sea Level ===
- Sea Level (1977)
- Cats on the Coast (1977)

=== Jaimoe's Jasssz Band ===
- Ed Blackwell Memorial Concert 2/27/2008 (2008)
- Live at the Double Down Grill 1/28/2006 (2008)
- Renaissance Man (2011)
- Live at 2016 Wanee Music Festival (2016)
- Live at 2016 Peach Music Festival (2016)
- Wanee Music Festival: Recorded Live at Cornett's Spirit of Suwanee Music Park, April 19–22, 2017 (2017)
- Live at 2018 Peach Music Festival (2018)
- Live at Wanee 2018 (2018)
- Live at the 2019 Peach Music Festival (2019)
