= Gregg Allman discography =

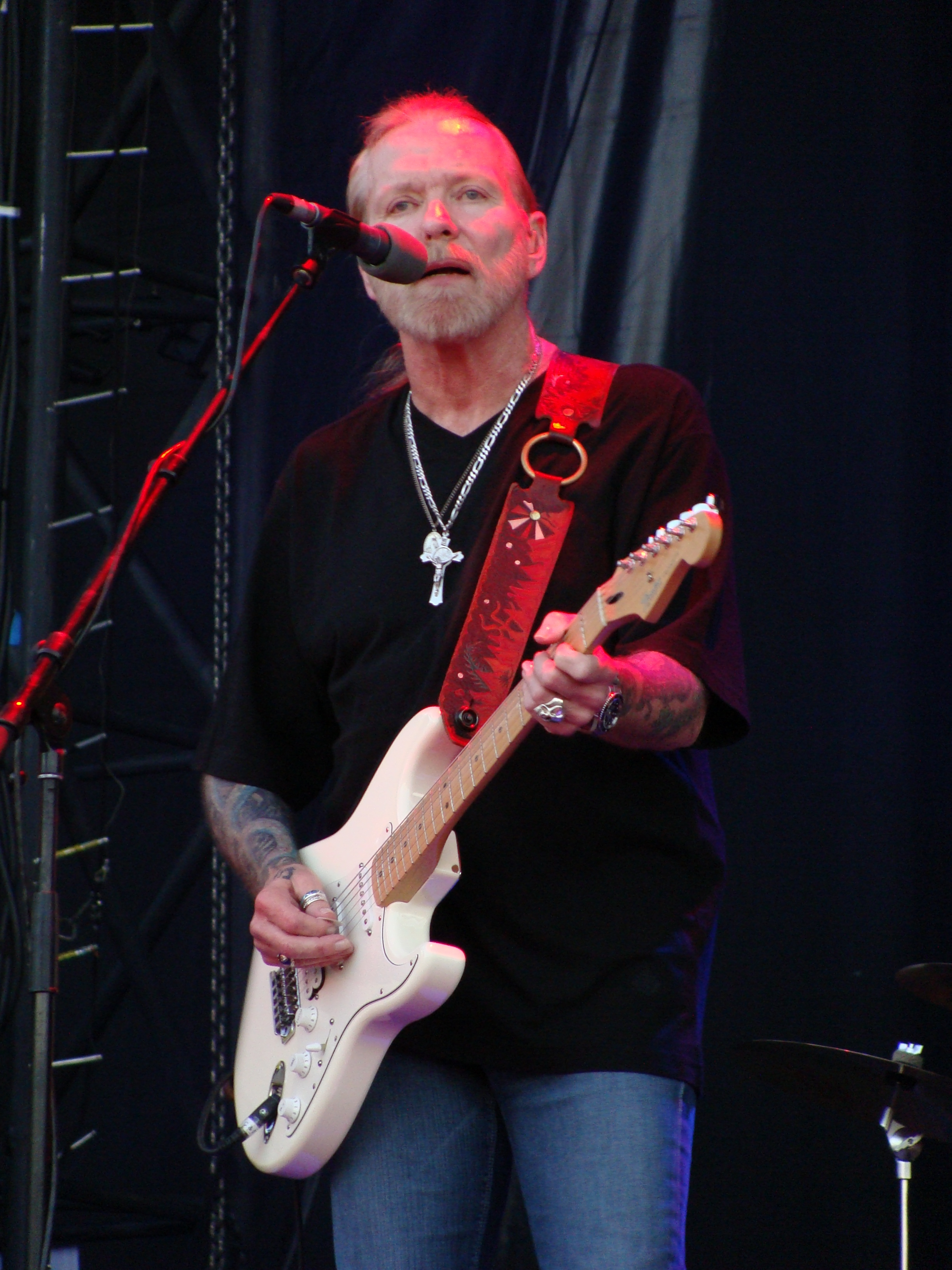
- Gregg Allman performing in 2011
- Studio albums: 8
- EPs: 2
- Live albums: 2
- Tribute albums: 1
- Singles: 14
- Video albums: 2
- Music videos: 3
- Collaboration albums: 1

The following is the discography of Gregg Allman, an American singer-songwriter and musician, also including releases from the Gregg Allman Band. Allman released his debut studio album, Laid Back, in 1973; it charted at number 13 on Billboard's Top Pop Albums chart and went gold. His subsequent solo releases, including the live album The Gregg Allman Tour (1974), Playin' Up a Storm (1977), and the collaboration Two the Hard Way (1977) with Cher, did not fare well on charts or in sales. In 1987, he was signed to Epic Records, and his third solo album, I'm No Angel, went gold on the strength of its title track. His next two solo albums, Just Before the Bullets Fly (1988) and Searching for Simplicity (1997), did not perform well. His final studio album released during his lifetime, Low Country Blues (2011), represented his biggest chart positions, including at number five in the US. A posthumous studio album, Southern Blood, was released on September 8, 2017.

In 2009, Raven Records in Australia released the compilation "One More Silver Dollar: The Solo Years 1973-1997", sampling his first six solo records, plus a duet with Bonnie Bramlett, "Two Steps From the Blues" from her 1976 solo album, "Lady's Choice".

On 28 October 2021, Sony Music Publishing announced it had signed a global agreement with Gregg Allman's estate to administer its catalog of songs. The deal covers many of Allman's compositions from his time as a member of the Allman Brothers Band, as well as songs written throughout his solo career.

== Albums ==
=== Studio albums ===
List of studio albums, with selected chart positions, sales figures and certifications
| Year | Album details | Peak chart positions | | | | | | Sales | Certifications |
| Year | Album details | US | CAN | GER | NOR | SWI | UK | Sales | Certifications |
|---|---|---|---|---|---|---|---|---|---|
| 1972 | Duane & Greg Allman: Released: May 1972; Label: Bold | — | — | — | — | — | — | | |
| 1973 | Laid Back: Released: October 1973; Label: Capricorn | 13 | 19 | — | — | — | — | | RIAA: Gold |
| 1977 | Playin' Up a Storm: Released: May 1977; Label: Capricorn | 42 | — | — | — | — | — | | |
| 1987 | I'm No Angel: Released: February 5, 1987; Label: Epic | 30 | 92 | — | — | — | — | | RIAA: Gold |
| 1988 | Just Before the Bullets Fly: Released: July 12, 1988; Label: Epic | 117 | — | — | — | — | — | | |
| 1997 | Searching for Simplicity: Released: November 11, 1997; Label: 550 Music | — | — | — | — | — | — | | |
| 2011 | Low Country Blues: Released: January 18, 2011; Label: Rounder | 5 | 12 | 83 | 23 | — | 48 | US: 36,000 | |
| 2017 | Southern Blood: Released: September 8, 2017; Label: Rounder | 11 | 84 | 34 | — | 21 | 79 | | |
"—" denotes a recording that did not chart or was not released in that territory.

=== Live albums ===
List of live albums, with selected chart positions
| Year | Album details | Peak chart positions | |
| Year | Album details | US | GER |
|---|---|---|---|
| 1974 | The Gregg Allman Tour: Released: 1974; Label: Capricorn | 50 | — |
| 2015 | Live: Back to Macon, GA: Released: August 7, 2015; Label: Rounder | 124 | 47 |
| 2024 | Uncle Sam's: Released: September 20, 2024; Label: Sawrite | | |
| 2025 | One Night in DC: May 15, 1984: Released: June 20, 2025; Label: Sawrite | | |
| 2026 | Great As Ever: Live in Philadelphia '86: Released: April 10, 2026; Label: Sawrite | | |
"—" denotes a recording that did not chart or was not released in that territory.

=== Collaboration albums ===
List of collaboration albums
| Year | Album details |
|---|---|
| 1977 | Two the Hard Way (with Cher): Released: November 1977; Label: Warner Bros. |

=== Tribute albums ===
List of tribute albums, with selected chart positions
| Year | Album details | Peak chart positions | |
| Year | Album details | US | GER |
|---|---|---|---|
| 2014 | All My Friends: Celebrating the Songs & Voice of Gregg Allman: Released: May 6, 2014; Label: Rounder | 39 | 51 |

=== Compilation albums ===
List of compilation albums
| Year | Album details |
|---|---|
| 1997 | One More Try: An Anthology: Released: September 23, 1997; Label: Polygram |
| 2002 | 20th Century Masters: The Millennium Collection: Released: March 26, 2002; Label: Mercury |
| 2002 | No Stranger to the Dark: The Best of Gregg Allman: Released: June 1, 2002; Label: Epic |
| 2009 | One More Silver Dollar - The Solo Years 1973-1997: Released: October 13, 2009; Label: Raven Records |
| 2012 | Playlist: The Very Best of Gregg Allman: Released: January 31, 2012; Label: Epic/Legacy |

== Extended plays ==
List of extended plays
| Year | Album details |
|---|---|
| 1973 | Laid Back (Note: This extended play featured selections from Allman's 1973 album, also titled Laid Back.): Released: October 1973; Label: Capricorn |
| 2015 | Gregg Allman: Released: April 18, 2015; Label: Rounder |
| 2017 | ...Live: Released: August 4, 2017 |

== Singles ==
List of singles, with selected chart positions and certifications, showing year released and album name
| Title (A-side / B-side) | Year | Peak chart positions | | | Album |
| Title (A-side / B-side) | Year | US | US Main. Rock | CAN | Album |
|---|---|---|---|---|---|
| "I've Been Trying" (Note: "I've Been Trying" is a song by Hour Glass, first released on their self-titled debut album in 1967. It was issued as a single under the name "Greg Allman and The Hour Glass" in 1969.) "Silently" | 1969 | — — | — — | — — | Hour Glass |
| "Midnight Rider" "Multi-Coloured Lady" | 1973 | 19 — | — — | 17 — | Laid Back |
| "Don't Mess Up a Good Thing" "Please Call Home" | 1974 | — — | — — | — — | Laid Back |
| "Cryin' Shame" "One More Try" | 1977 | — — | — — | — — | Playin' Up a Storm |
| "Move Me" "Love Me" (with Cher) | 1977 | — — | — — | — — | Two the Hard Way |
| "Midnight Rider" "Queen of Hearts" | 1978 | — — | — — | — — | Laid Back |
| "In You (I Found Me)" "Roll of the Dice" (with Terri Rice) | 1986 | — — | — — | — — | Terri Rice |
| "I'm No Angel" "Lead Me On" | 1987 | 49 — | 1 — | — — | I'm No Angel |
| "Can't Keep Running" "Anything Goes" | 1987 | — — | 25; 3 | — — | I'm No Angel |
| "Evidence of Love" "Anything Goes" | 1987 | — — | — — | — — | I'm No Angel |
| "Slip Away" "Every Hungry Woman" | 1988 | — — | 17 — | — — | Just Before the Bullets Fly |
| "Can't Get Over You" | 1988 | — | 3 | — | Just Before the Bullets Fly |
| "I'll Be Holding On" | 1989 | — | — | — | Black Rain (Original Motion Picture Soundtrack) |
| "Just Another Rider" | 2011 | — | — | 27 | Low Country Blues |
| "Whipping Post" (live) | 2015 | — | — | — | Gregg Allman Live: Back to Macon, GA |
| "Love Like Kerosene" (live) | 2015 | — | — | — | Gregg Allman Live: Back to Macon, GA |
| "My Only True Friend" | 2017 | — | — | — | Southern Blood |
"—" denotes a recording that did not chart or was not released in that territory.

== Other appearances ==
| Year | Song | Album |
|---|---|---|
| 1974 | "Dreams" | Peaches: Pick of the Crop |
| 1978 | "Are You Lonely for Me, Baby?" | Hotels, Motels and Road Shows |
| 1989 | "I'll Be Holding On" | Black Rain (Original Motion Picture Soundtrack) |
| 1989 | "Brother to Brother" | Next of Kin (Original Motion Picture Soundtrack) |
| 1990 | "Don't Stand in My Way" | Out for Justice (Original Motion Picture Soundtrack) |
| 1991 | "Mountain Cry" | Blues Traveler – Travelers and Thieves |
| 2007 | "Come and Go Blues" | Warren Haynes Presents The Benefit Concert Volume 2 |
| 2011 | "Devil Got My Woman" | T Bone Burnett: The Producer |
| 2013 | "Long Black Veil" | Love for Levon: A Benefit to Save the Barn |
| 2013 | "Midnight Train" | James Cotton – Cotton Mouth Man |
| 2013 | "The Needle and the Damage Done" "Midnight Rider" | Eric Clapton – Crossroads Guitar Festival 2013 |
| 2014 | "Just Say When" | Mindi Abair – Wild Heart |

== Videos ==
=== Music videos ===
List of music videos, with directors, showing year released
| Title | Year | Director(s) |
|---|---|---|
| "I'm No Angel" | 1987 | Jeff Stein |
| "I'll Be Holding On" | 1989 | Michael Bay |
| "My Only True Friend" | 2017 | Adam Jones |

=== Video albums ===
List of video albums
| Year | Album details |
|---|---|
| 1988 | One Way Out: Released: 1988; Label: Castle Hendring |
| 2015 | Live: Back to Macon, GA: Released: August 7, 2015; Label: Rounder |

== See also ==
- The Allman Brothers Band discography
