= My Cross to Bear =

Autobiographic memoir

- Author: Gregg Allman; Alan Light
- Language: English
- Genre: Autobiography; memoir
- Published: William Morrow and Company
- Publication date: May 1, 2012
- Publication place: United States
- Pages: 390
- ISBN: 978-0062112033

My Cross to Bear is an autobiographic memoir of American songwriter-musician Gregg Allman, co-founder of the Allman Brothers Band. It was written by Allman and American journalist Alan Light. The book was published by William Morrow and Company on May 1, 2012. The book's title stems from the Allman Brothers Band song "It's Not My Cross to Bear" (1969). Allman first began keeping a journal in the 1980s, with the intention to possibly write a memoir at some point. He worked with Light to use that, as well as new and old interviews to create the book.

The book chronicles Allman's life and career in music, including his beginnings with the Allman Joys and Hour Glass, finding success and later reforming the Allman Brothers Band, his solo career and albums, and his marriage to pop star Cher. A large portion of the book candidly details the drug and alcohol abuse he dealt with for much of his life. It also covers Allman's brother Duane, his death in a motorcycle crash, and how it affected him.

Upon its May 2012 release, My Cross to Bear achieved high critical reviews, with many praising its tone and honesty. The book was optioned for a feature film, Midnight Rider, which was eventually cancelled after a train accident on set caused the death of a member of the crew.

== Background ==
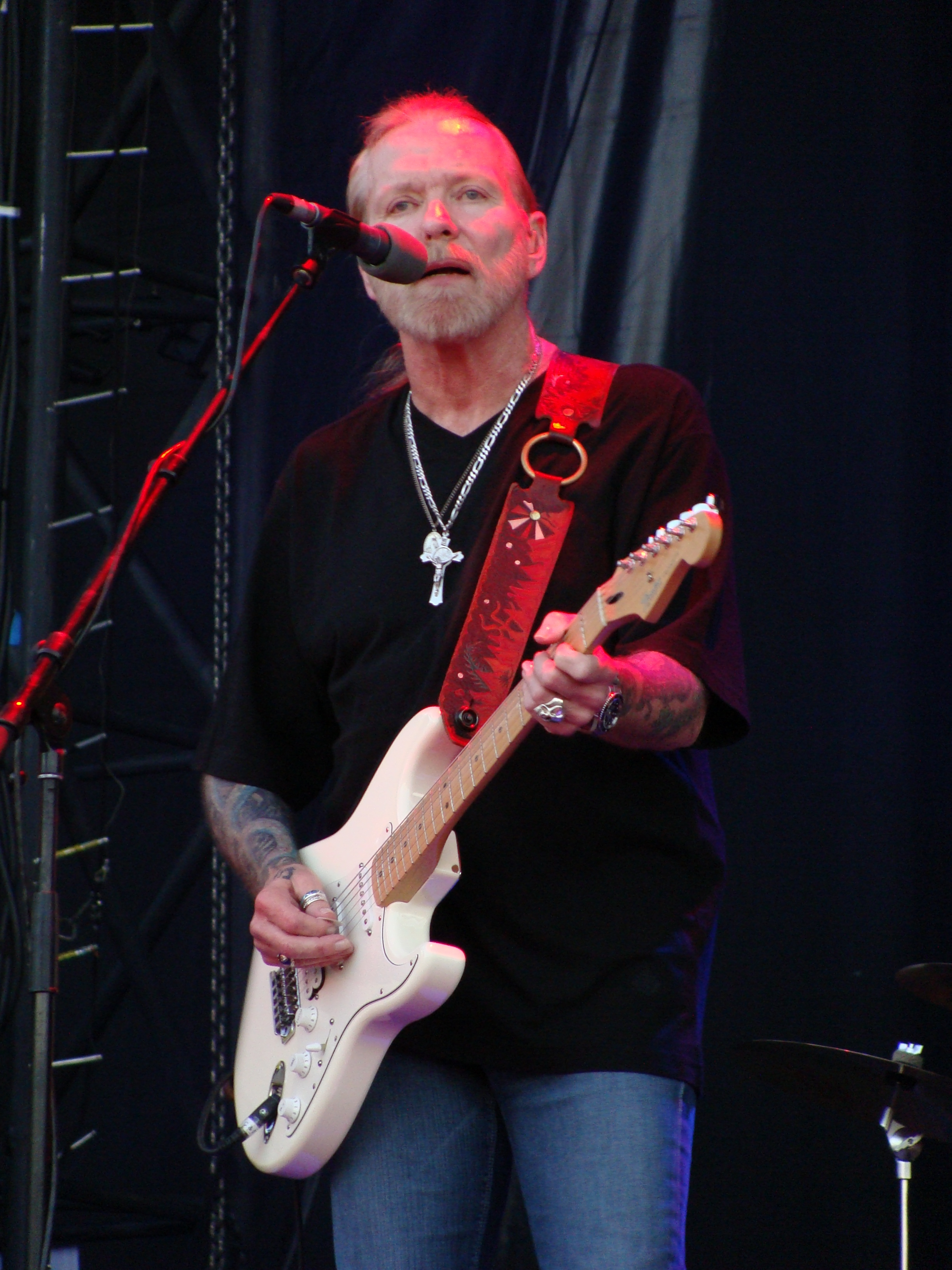
Allman performing in 2011

Allman first had the idea for documenting his life in the mid-1970s, and started keeping a journal in 1981. He first had the idea for a memoir while privately reflecting, noting to himself, "One of these days I will be an old man in a rocking chair on a porch. Wouldn't it be nice to have my whole life there to read and kind of re-live it?" A member of the Allman Brothers Band's road crew, Kirk West, had an encyclopedic memory of their history, and they began to meet each Thursday to record Allman's recollections on cassette tape. Over the years, Allman kept these cassettes—which together amounted to over 67 pounds worth. He eventually showed it to Michael Lehman, his manager from 2003 onward, who suggested begin in earnest on a memoir and connected him with a publishing company.

Journalist Alan Light co-wrote the book. Light first came to Allman's attention when he profiled him for The New York Times in 2010, preceding the release of Allman's seventh album, Low Country Blues. He noted in a later interview that he was apprehensive about working on the book, as Allman could be shy and reluctant to speak. "I think everybody knows this isn't Steven Tyler," Light said. "This is somebody who's more private in some ways for reasons that are easy to understand given his life." He and Allman met for several two-hour interview sessions, amounting to about 20 hours in total, for the book. Allman opened up more than he imagined he would, and considered the sessions therapeutic.

== Critical response ==
The book largely received positive reviews from critics. "This book is everything you could hope for: in a grizzled, laconic drawl, Allman provides a rambling backstage account of his five decades with the Allman Brothers Band, and he doesn't seem to hold anything back," wrote Gregory Cowles for The New York Times Book Review. The Publishers Weekly review for the book states: "In his memoir, the rambling and rambunctious Gregg Allman lays bare his soul [...] In the end, Allman, writing with music journalist Light, has produced a fiercely honest memoir." Marco della Cava of USA Today wrote, "A soul-searching rumination on a hard-lived life [...] My Cross to Bear carries a welcome seal of honesty."

Many considered the conversational tone the book was written with to be a strong point. "He writes in a charming, Southern gentlemanly first-person voice. [...] The book's tone is so open and engaging, My Cross to Bear could appeal even to readers whose knowledge of the band begins and ends with "Ramblin' Man"," said Howard Cohen of PopMatters. John Soeder of The Plain Dealer felt that "Allman maintains a folksy, conversational tone [...] his candor makes for a compelling read." Andy Lewis of The Hollywood Reporter wrote that "As narrator of his private life, Allman is uneven — honest but not particularly insightful. [...] But as a chronicler of the band's exuberant rise and tragic dissolution, however, he is fabulous." Among the more negative reviews, The Washington Post's Mark Jenkins considered it a "just-the-facts telling that gives every event roughly the same emphasis."

The book was listed at number 20 in Rolling Stone's 2012 list of "The 25 Greatest Rock Memoirs of All Time." Billboard ranked it 85 on their 2016 list of the "100 Greatest Music Books of All Time", noting, "Gregg Allman may have a gruff image, but he pours his heart and soul out to co-writer Alan Light for this autobiography."
