= One More Try: An Anthology =

Compilation album by Gregg Allman
- Released: September 23, 1997
- Genre: Southern rock; soul
- Label: Polygram; Capricorn
- Producer: Kirk West; Bill Levenson (exec.)

Gregg Allman chronology
Just Before the Bullets Fly (1988)	One More Try: An Anthology (1997)	Searching for Simplicity (1997)

Professional ratings
Review scores
Source	Rating
AllMusic	4.5/5 stars
Rolling Stone Album Guide	3/5 stars

One More Try: An Anthology is a compilation album by American singer-songwriter Gregg Allman, released on September 23, 1997, by Polygram Records and Capricorn Records. The set collects demos, outtakes, and previously unreleased alternate versions of songs by Allman, mainly dating from the period in which he recorded his first solo album, Laid Back (1973).

It was promptly pulled from distribution shortly after its release and has been out of print since.

== Background ==
One More Try was compiled by Kirk West and Alan Paul, with Paul penning the essay in the album's liner notes. Paul mentions the release in his 2014 book One Way Out, commenting, "It's a true shame that this collection, which so beautifully reveals a hidden side of Gregg—vulnerable, acoustic, aching, soulful—is deeply out of print." No reason for its discontinuing has ever been given.

Geoffrey Himes of The Washington Post considered it a "most unusual retrospective," and wrote, "Many of these rarities suffer from a lack of rhythmic push, but to hear Allman growling and purring his way through his favorite Muddy Waters, Jackson Browne and Bobby Bland tunes as well as his own originals is a genuine treat." Thom Owens at AllMusic gave it 4.5 stars out of 5 and said, "Although it may be a little too comprehensive for some tastes, One More Try: An Anthology is the definitive Gregg Allman collection."

Many of these tracks have subsequently been released on the 2019 double disc remastered edition of Allman's Laid Back.

== Track listing ==
All tracks are written by Gregg Allman, except where noted

Disc one
No.	Title	Writer(s)	Length
1.	"One More Try" (Solo Piano & Vocal Demo)		3:14
2.	"One More Try" (Band Demo)		4:11
3.	"All My Friends" (Alternate Version)	Scott Boyer	4:10
4.	"Can't Lose What You Never Had" (Demo)	McKinley Morganfield	4:22
5.	"Midnight Rider"		4:29
6.	"God Rest His Soul" (Demo)	Steve Alaimo (Note: Though credited to Steve Alaimo, "God Rest His Soul" was written by Allman. He sold the publishing rights to this song and half of "Melissa" (which he later re-acquired) in 1968.)	4:49
7.	"Multi Colored Lady" (Solo Guitar & Vocal Demo)		4:37
8.	"When a Man Loves a Woman" (Demo)	Calvin Lewis; Andrew Wright	3:42
9.	"Slip Away"	W. Terrell; W. Armstrong; M. Daniels	4:27
10.	"I Feel So Bad" (Tour Rehearsal)	Chuck Willis	5:35
11.	"Wasted Words" (Previously Unreleased)		5:59
12.	"Turn on Your Love Light" (Tour Rehearsal)	D. Malone; Joe Scott	3:57
13.	"Brightest Smile in Town" (Tour Rehearsal)	Barry DeVorzon; Bob Sherman; Ray Charles	3:04
14.	"Can You Fool" (Demo)	Michael Smotherman	3:15
15.	"Never Knew How Much" (Solo Guitar & Vocal Demo)		3:15
16.	"Please Call Home"		2:47
17.	"Will the Circle Be Unbroken" (Band Demo)	Traditional, arr. by Allman and Johnny Sandlin	5:13

Disc two
No.	Title	Writer(s)	Length
1.	"Bring It On Back" (Solo Piano & Vocal Demo)		4:34
2.	"Catfish Blues" (Solo Guitar & Vocal Demo)	Morganfield	4:10
3.	"Come & Go Blues" (Solo Guitar & Vocal, Live)		5:00
4.	"Adam's Song" / "Shadow Dream Song" (Solo Guitar & Vocal Demo)	Jackson Browne	4:05
5.	"These Days" (Alternate Version)	Browne	3:56
6.	"God Rest His Soul" (Band Demo)	Alaimo	5:30
7.	"Queen of Hearts" (Alternate Version)		6:13
8.	"Rain" (Demo)	John Lennon; Paul McCartney	3:01
9.	"It's Not My Cross to Bear" (Demo)		4:00
10.	"Win, Lose or Draw" (Previously Unreleased)		4:45
11.	"Will the Circle Be Unbroken" (Solo Guitar & Vocal Demo)	Traditional, arr. by Allman	3:40
12.	"Shadow Dream Song" (Solo Guitar & Vocal Demo)	Browne	2:25
13.	"Multi Colored Lady" (Alternate Version)		4:49
14.	"Bad Dream" (Previously Unreleased)		5:19
15.	"Lead Me On"	Allman; Dan Toler	4:44
16.	"Oncoming Traffic"	Allman; Janice B. Allman	5:56
17.	"Melissa"		4:00
