= One Night in DC: May 15, 1984 =

Live album by Gregg Allman Band
- Released: June 20, 2025
- Recorded: May 15, 1984
- Venue: The Bayou
- Genre: Rock
- Label: Sawrite Records

Gregg Allman chronology
Uncle Sam's (2024)	One Night in DC: May 15, 1984 (2025)	Great As Ever: Live in Philadelphia '86 (2026)

One Night in DC: May 15, 1984 is a live album by the Gregg Allman Band, a rock group led by Gregg Allman. It was recorded at the Bayou in Washington, D.C. on May 15, 1984. It was released on June 20, 2025.

== Critical reception ==
In Glide Magazine Doug Collette wrote, "... instead of any misguided attempt to recreate the sound and power of the Allman Brothers Band, the performance is, like its predecessor [Uncle Sam's], a purposeful exercise in bringing evocative material to life, rendered by essentially the same lineup that had recorded the soon-to-be-released studio album Just Before the Bullets Fly... The overall pacing of this setlist is superb."

In Rock & Blues Muse Hal Horowitz said, "This titular Washington, DC performance finds Gregg’s band in muscular shape; well rehearsed and with a taut, tight fire that keeps eleven of the dozen tunes within six or seven minute boundaries.... Not surprisingly Allman taps into the ABB catalog generously for lively, sometimes slightly rearranged covers of key tunes from their classic period. Eight selections fit that bill..."

On jambands.com, Larson Sutton wrote, "Whether fresh or famed [songs], Allman set alight the repertoire with his immortal, highway-tested vocal, aided well by the gymnastic six-string work of [Dan] Toler and [Bruce] Waibel.... It's a wonder that Waibel would move to the bass chair [later], as his playing here is particularly captivating, and a motivating factor, among many, to add this historic performance to any collection."

== Track listing ==
1. "Dreams" (Gregg Allman) – 6:53
2. "Sweet Feelin'" (Clarence Carter, Marcus Daniel, Rick Hall, Candi Staton) – 5:51
3. "Hot 'Lanta" (Duane Allman, Gregg Allman, Dickey Betts, Jai Johanny Johanson, Berry Oakley, Butch Trucks) – 4:40
4. "Yours for the Asking" (Gregg Allman, Dan Toler, Dave Toler) – 3:38
5. "Need Your Love So Bad" (William Edward John, Mertis John Jr.) – 5:06
6. "Trouble No More" (McKinley Morganfield) – 3:27
7. "Matthew's Arrival" (Neil Larsen) – 17:45
8. "Melissa" (Gregg Allman, Stephen Alaimo) – 5:42
9. "Midnight Rider" (Gregg Allman, Robert Kim Payne) – 4:11
10. "Faces Without Names" (Gregg Allman, Dan Toler) – 3:26
11. "Statesboro Blues" (Will McTell) – 6:39
12. Band introduction – 0:57
13. "One Way Out" (Elmore James, Marshall Sehorn) – 7:45

== Personnel ==
- Gregg Allman – lead vocals, Hammond B-3 organ, acoustic guitar
- Dan Toler – lead guitar
- Frankie Toler – drums
- Greg Voorhess – bass
- Bruce Waibel – guitar
- Chaz Trippy – percussion
- Tim Heding – keyboards
