= Black Rain (soundtrack) =

1989 soundtrack album

Black Rain: Original Motion Picture Soundtrack

Soundtrack album by various artists
- Released: October 3, 1989
- Genre: Hard rock; reggae; R&B; film score
- Length: 48:26
- Label: Virgin Movie Music
- Producer: Hans Zimmer; Jay Rifkin

Black Rain: Music from the Motion Picture

Soundtrack album by Hans Zimmer
- Released: September 25, 2012
- Genre: Film score
- Label: La-La Land Records
- Producer: Hans Zimmer; Jay Rifkin

Black Rain: Original Motion Picture Soundtrack is the soundtrack album to the 1989 film Black Rain directed by Ridley Scott, starring Michael Douglas, Andy García, Ken Takakura, Kate Capshaw, and Yūsaku Matsuda. The film score is composed by Hans Zimmer in his first collaboration with Scott. The soundtrack was released as a double disc album on October 3, 1989, by Virgin Movie Music and featured popular songs alongside Zimmer's score suite. Zimmer's complete score was released by La-La Land Records on September 25, 2012, as a double disc album, that also included contents from the original 1989 release. His score was regarded as the blueprint for action film scores influencing several films.

== Background ==
Black Rain marked Zimmer's maiden collaboration with Ridley Scott, who would collaborate with the director on several films including Thelma & Louise (1991), Gladiator (2000), Hannibal, Black Hawk Down (both 2001) and Matchstick Men (2003). It was also Zimmer's first score for an action film where he used drums, percussions and sequencers for the soundscape. The score was conducted and orchestrated by Shirley Walker.

According to Zimmer, the soundscape for Black Rain was different from other Hollywood films released during that time. However, post the film's release, he recalled that his music was temped by music editors which resulted in every other action film sounding similar to his score. This prompted Zimmer to change the composition and style for Crimson Tide (1995).

Besides Zimmer's score, the album features the chart hits "The Way You Do the Things You Do" by UB40 and "Back to Life" by Soul II Soul, plus the original songs "Livin' on the Edge of the Night" by Iggy Pop and "I'll Be Holding On" by Gregg Allman. Japanese musician Ryuichi Sakamoto contributed the song "Laserman" to the soundtrack.

== Release ==
The soundtrack was originally released as a 7-track album in 1989 by Virgin Movie Music on cassette, vinyl and compact disc. It was re-released in 2012 by La-La Land Records as a two-disc set, with the complete score as Disc 1 and an extended version of the 1989 soundtrack as Disc 2.

== Track listing ==
=== Black Rain: Original Motion Picture Soundtrack ===
Side A
No.	Title	Writer(s)	Artist	Length
1.	"Livin' on the Edge of the Night"	Eric Rackin; Jay Rifkin	Iggy Pop	3:40
2.	"The Way You Do the Things You Do"	Robert Rogers; William Robinson	UB40	3:15
3.	"Back to Life" (Jam on the Groove Mix)	Beresford Romeo; Paul Hooper; Simon Law	Soul II Soul Featuring Caron Wheeler	5:09
4.	"Laserman"	Sakamoto	Ryuichi Sakamoto	4:49
5.	"Singing in the Shower"	Ron Mael; Russell Mael	Les Rita Mitsouko and Sparks	4:24
6.	"I'll Be Holding On"	Hans Zimmer; Will Jennings	Gregg Allman	5:40

Side B: Black Rain Suite
No.	Title	Writer(s)	Length
1.	"Sato"	Hans Zimmer	4:45
2.	"Charlie Loses his Head"	Zimmer	7:03
3.	"Sugai"	Zimmer	6:55
4.	"Nick & Masa"	Zimmer	2:52

=== Black Rain: Music from the Motion Picture ===
All tracks are written by Hans Zimmer, except where noted.

Disc 1
No.	Title	Length
1.	"Sato Pt. 1 - One-Way Glass"	6:34
2.	"Osaka - Phony Cops"	1:46
3.	"You Gonna Be Nice? - Sato Pt. 2"	5:21
4.	"Sato Watching - Circling Motorbikes"	1:59
5.	"Sugai's Photo - Sato Pt. 3"	3:58
6.	"Sato Pt. 4"	2:05
7.	"Charlie Loses His Head"	8:22
8.	"Sequins"	2:42
9.	"Masa's Reprimand - Sugai Pt. 1"	5:33
10.	"The Steel Mill"	2:45
11.	"Steel Mill Chase - Airplane - Escape"	6:18
12.	"Sugai Pt. 2"	8:50
13.	"Arrival of Oyabuns - Sato's Arrival - Meeting"	7:55
14.	"Bikes - Fight - Nick and Masa"	9:29

Disc 2
No.	Title	Writer(s)	Artist	Length
1.	"Livin' on the Edge of the Night"	Rackin; Rifkin	Iggy Pop	3:38
2.	"The Way You Do the Things You Do"	Rogers; Robinson	UB40	3:15
3.	"Back to Live" (Jam on the Groove Mix)	Romeo; Hooper; Law	Soul II Soul Featuring Caron Wheeler	5:07
4.	"Laserman"	Sakamoto	Ryuichi Sakamoto	4:48
5.	"Singing in the Shower"	Ron Mael; Russell Mael	Les Rita Mitsouko and Sparks	4:22
6.	"I'll Be Holding On"	Zimmer; Jennings	Gregg Allman	5:38
7.	"Sato"			4:45
8.	"Charlie Loses his Head"			7:03
9.	"Sugai"			6:55
10.	"Nick & Masa"			2:52
11.	"Airplane Muzak" (Source)		Shirley Walker	2:05
12.	"Charlie Loses His Head Pt. 1" (Alternate Percussion)			2:32
13.	"Charlie Loses His Head Pt. 2" (Alternate with Koto and Oboe)			2:47
14.	"Masa's Reprimand" (Alternate)			1:49
15.	"Bikes - Fight" (Alternate)			3:18
16.	"Bikes" (Percussion Only)			1:35
17.	"Charlie Loses His Head" (Monks Wild)			2:12
18.	"I'll Be Holding On" (Main Title Version)	Zimmer; Jennings	Gregg Allman	2:36

== Reception ==
Jonathan Broxton of Movie Music UK wrote "Black Rain is a truly groundbreaking score, representing the genesis of the Zimmer sound which would come to dominate the Hollywood film music scene over the course of the next decade, and shows no sign of abating thirty years later. However, Black Rain is not just a museum piece – it's an exciting, energetic, enjoyable score in its own right; the three inter-weaving themes, the bold and uncompromising rhythmic and percussive ideas, and the fusion between western and eastern instruments are all things that Zimmer does with great confidence and talent, and anyone who has an affinity for the ‘power anthem years’ as I do will find this score to be firmly aligned with their taste."

Tom Demalon of AllMusic wrote "The first half of the soundtrack to Ridley Scott's Black Rain is a cobbled-together collection of songs that really have little to do with the movie (something that had become the norm during the latter half of the '80s) [...] The second half is a four-part "Black Rain Suite" which fits the taut, suspenseful plot well as composer Hans Zimmer merges electronics with Japanese instrumentation to good effect." Christian Clemmensen of Filmtracks wrote "Zimmer has often commented that it's somewhat amazing (and even baffling) to see his music for Black Rain become so influential, and to an extent, some head-scratching is merited. It's a good score, but not particularly refined or impressive in its sum. No matter your opinion, it's an important work in the history of Digital Age film music, and it deserves appreciation and even study at the very least."

Chris Bumbray of JoBlo.com called it an "amazing, hard-edged score". Em Casalena of American Songwriter noted it as one of Zimmer's underrated scores, saying "The Black Rain soundtrack is an excellent example of Zimmer's earlier, rougher work. The score blends synth, electronica, and traditional orchestral elements in a way that just works. The sound is recognizable in many late 1980s and early 1990s cyberpunk/neo-noir films. Did Zimmer set the trend? Who knows. But, it's a great soundtrack with an iconic ending song." Jacob Dunstan of Collider noted that Zimmer "weaves a beautiful musical tapestry throughout the picture that truly reaches its zenith at the film's conclusion"

== Personnel ==
- Music composer – Hans Zimmer
- Music producer – Hans Zimmer, Jay Rifkin
- Recording and mixing – Jay Rifkin
- Mastering – Tom Baker
- Digital transfers – Johnny Dee Davis
- Soundtrack coordinator – Kim Seiniger, Mary Jo Braun
- Music consultant – Lukas Kendall, Ian Underwood
- Executive producer – Ridley Scott
- Music supervisor – Dick Rudolph
- Liner notes – Tim Greiving
- Production manager – Frank K. Dewald
- Executive in charge of music for Paramount Pictures – Randy Spendlove

Orchestra

- Conductor – Shirley Walker
- Orchestrator – Shirley Walker, Victor Sagerquist
- Contractor – Carl Fortina
- Music librarian – Emmett Estren
- Proofreader – Victor Sagerquist, Emmett Estren
- Copyists – Robert Bornstein, Victor Sagerquist, Emmett Estren

Instruments

- Bass – Arni Egilsson, Charles Berghofer, Charles Domanico, Milton Kestenbaum, Norman S. Ludwin, Stephens La Fever, Timothy Barr
- Bass flute and recorder – Brice Martin
- Cello – Anne Karam, Antony J. Cooke, Barry Gold, Christine Ermacoff, Dane Little, David Shamban, Douglas L. Davis, Fred Seykora, Gloria Lum, Harry Shlutz, Larry Corbett, J. Michael Mathews, Miguel Martinez, Nils Oliver, Paula Hochhalter, Roger Lebow, Ronald B. Cooper, Stephen Erdody
- French horn – Brian O'Connor, Carol Drake, David A. Duke, Jerry Folsom, Richard Todd, Suzette Moriarty
- Guitar – Jennifer Batten
- Keyboards – Steve Porcaro
- Koto – June Kuramoto
- Shakuhachi – Daniel Kuramoto, Brice Martin
- Trombone – Alan Kaplan, William F. Reichenbach, Dick Hyde, Richard T. Nash
- Trumpet – G. Burnette Dillon, Malcolm McNab, Mario F. Guarneri
- Viola – Alan De Veritch, Brian P. Dembow, Carole Mukogawa, David Stenske, Denise Buffum, Dmitri Bovaird, Harry Shirinian, Kenneth Burward-Hoy, Linn Subotnick, Marcy Dicterow, Myra Kestenbaum, Richard Gerding
- Violin – Anatoly Rosinsky, Arnold Belnick, Assa Drori, Bonnie Douglas, Brian Leonard, Bruce Dukov, Christopher Reutinger, Claudia Parducci, Daniel Shindaryov, Darius Campo, David Frisina, Haim Shtrum, Harold Wolf, Herman Clebanoff, Jacqueline I. Brand, Jean Hugo, Jeffrey Gauthier, Jennifer Woodward, John Wittenberg, Julie Gigante, Karen Jones, Kathleen Lenski, Kenneth Yerke, Norman Carr, Pat Johnson, Paul C. Shure, Rene Mandel, Robert Sushel, Roger Wilkie, Ronald Folsom, Sheldon Sanov, Stanley Plummer, Steven Scharf, Thelma L. Hanau (Beach), Thomas Buffum, William Hymanson, Yoko Matsuda

== Additional music ==
Songs not included in the soundtrack, but featured in the film include the following:

- "Beyond the Sea" by Bobby Darin
- "Kasa Odori" by Mary Evans
- "Ogi no Mato (The Folding Fan as a Target)" by Ensemble Nipponia
- "That's Amore" by Harry Warren and Jack Brooks
- "What'd I Say" by Ray Charles, performed by Andy Garcia and Ken Takakura
