= Dottsy =

American country music singer

- Born: Dottsy Brodt; April 6, 1953 (age 73)
- Origin: Seguin, Texas, U.S.
- Genres: Country
- Occupation: Singer
- Instruments: Vocals, guitar
- Years active: 1975–present
- Labels: RCA; Tanglewood; Heart of Texas Records

Dottsy Brodt Dwyer (born April 6, 1953) is an American country music singer. She grew up in Seguin. Between 1975 and 1981, she recorded as Dottsy for the RCA Records label. During that timespan, she charted thirteen cuts on the Billboard Hot Country Songs chart, including the Top Ten "(After Sweet Memories) Play Born to Lose Again." Four of her other songs reached Top 20 on the same chart.

She returned to her hometown where her family has deep roots. She married and took time off needed to raise her children, while being active in local groups. After her children finished college, Dottsy signed with Heart of Texas Records and in 2010 released an album entitled Meet Me in Texas. She has been performing on a circuit of mostly small towns in Texas, usually touring with other artists from the label.

Dottsy's favorite venue is the Texas Theatre in Seguin, an 80-year-old one-time movie house. She helped the Seguin Conservation Society raise funds to restore the small movie palace.

== Discography ==
=== Albums ===
| Year | Album details | Peak chart positions |
| Year | Album details | US Country |
|---|---|---|
| 1976 | The Sweetest Thing: Release date: February 1976; Label: RCA | 27 |
| 1979 | Tryin' to Satisfy You: Release date: April 1979; Label: RCA | — |
| 2010 | Meet Me In Texas: Release date: April 2010; Label: Heart of Texas Records | — |

=== Singles ===
| Year | Single | Peak chart positions | | Album |
| Year | Single | US Country | CAN Country | Album |
|---|---|---|---|---|
| 1975 | "Storms Never Last" | 17 | 5 | The Sweetest Thing |
| 1975 | "I'll Be Your San Antone Rose" | 12 | 7 | The Sweetest Thing |
| 1976 | "The Sweetest Thing (I've Ever Known)" | 86 | — | The Sweetest Thing |
| 1976 | "Love Is a Two-Way Street" | 68 | — | single only |
| 1977 | "(After Sweet Memories) Play Born to Lose Again" | 10 | 6 | Tryin' to Satisfy You |
| 1977 | "It Should Have Been Easy" | 22 | — | Tryin' to Satisfy You |
| 1978 | "Here in Love" | 20 | — | single only |
| 1978 | "I Just Had You on My Mind" | 21 | — | Tryin' to Satisfy You |
| 1979 | "Tryin' to Satisfy You" | 12 | 18 | Tryin' to Satisfy You |
| 1979 | "Slip Away" | 22 | 27 | Tryin' to Satisfy You |
| 1979 | "When I'm Gone" | 34 | — | singles only |
| 1981 | "Somebody's Darling, Somebody's Wife" | 32 | — | singles only |
| 1981 | "Let the Little Bird Fly" | 58 | — | singles only |
