= Gregg Allman: The Music of My Soul =

Documentary film about Gregg Allman

- Film poster
- Directed by: James Keach
- Produced by: Michael Lehman; James Keach; Alexandra Komisaruk
- Starring: Gregg Allman
- Cinematography: Ian Coad
- Edited by: Alexandra Komisaruk
- Music by: Bennett Salvay; Julian Raymond
- Release date: June 9, 2026
- Running time: 96 minutes
- Country: United States
- Language: English
- Box office: $434,622

Gregg Allman: The Music of My Soul is a 2026 American documentary film about the rock musician Gregg Allman. It was directed by James Keach.

== Synopsis ==
Gregg Allman (1947 – 2017) was an American singer, songwriter, and musician who played keyboards and guitar. He was best known as a member of the Allman Brothers Band, which he co-founded with his older brother Duane Allman. Gregg Allman also had a solo career leading his own bands.

The film tells Gregg Allman's life story using a combination of archival material, past interviews with Allman and others, and contemporary interviews with a number of people who knew him, including Jaimoe, Chuck Leavell, and Warren Haynes.

== Release ==
The world premier of Gregg Allman: The Music of My Soul was at the Gramercy Theatre in New York City on June 9, 2026. Prior to the screening, Devon Allman and Duane Betts, the sons of Gregg Allman and Dickey Betts, performed several Allman Brothers Band songs.

The film was released in U.S. theaters on June 17, 2026, for a week in Los Angeles and New York and for a single showing elsewhere.
