= Playin' Up a Storm =

Studio album by The Gregg Allman Band
- Released: May 1977
- Studio: Warner Bros. Recording Studios, North Hollywood, California; United Western Studios, Hollywood, California
- Genre: Southern rock
- Length: 35:22
- Label: Capricorn
- Producer: Russ Titelman, Lenny Waronker

Gregg Allman chronology
The Gregg Allman Tour (1974)	Playin' Up a Storm (1977)	Two the Hard Way (1977)

Professional ratings
Review scores
Source	Rating
AllMusic	3.5/5 stars
Christgau's Record Guide	B+
The Encyclopedia of Popular Music	3/5 stars
MusicHound Rock: The Essential Album Guide	3/5 stars
Music Week	2/4 stars
Rolling Stone	4.5/5 stars
The Rolling Stone Album Guide	3.5/5 stars

Playin' Up a Storm is the second studio album by Gregg Allman. It was the first of three credited to his solo band.

Playin' Up a Storm was released in 1977 on Capricorn Records, not long after the Allman Brothers Band's acrimonious split, and peaked at number 42 on the Billboard 200.

== Background ==
Playin' Up a Storm was Allman's second solo studio effort, following 1973's Laid Back. It came after the breakup of the Allman Brothers Band in 1976. During this time, Allman had moved to Hollywood to live with his then-wife Cher. The album was produced by Lenny Waronker and Russ Titelman, and in his memoir, My Cross to Bear, Allman remembered that Waronker was frustrated with his unpunctuality in regards to studio time. The album was released in May 1977, on Capricorn Records. Allman claimed that Phil Walden, owner of Capricorn, was incensed over his move to the West Coast to live with Cher, and only printed 50,000 copies of the LP.

== Critical reception ==
The Rolling Stone Album Guide called the album a "harder-hitting" followup, writing that it "actually eclipsed most of the Allmans' work of the same period."

== Track listing ==
Side one

1. "Come and Go Blues" (Gregg Allman) – 4:48
2. "Let This Be a Lesson to Ya'" (Gregg Allman, Malcolm Rebennack) – 3:42
3. "Brightest Smile in Town" (Ray Charles, Barry De Vorzon, Bob Sherman) – 3:06
4. "Bring It on Back" (Gregg Allman) – 4:49

Side two

1. "Cryin' Shame" (Steve Beckmeier, Steve Berlin) – 3:44
2. "Sweet Feelin'" (Clarence Carter, Marcus Daniel, Rick Hall, Candi Staton) – 3:37
3. "It Ain't No Use" (Bernie Baum, Bill Giant, Florence Kaye) – 3:54
4. "Matthew's Arrival" (Neil Larsen) – 3:50
5. "One More Try" (Gregg Allman) – 3:53

== Personnel ==
=== The Gregg Allman Band ===
- Gregg Allman – vocals, organ, piano, Fender Rhodes, acoustic guitar
- Steve Beckmeier, John Leslie Hug – guitar
- Ricky Hirsch – guitar, slide guitar
- Willie Weeks – bass guitar
- Neil Larsen – synthesizer, piano, keyboards, Fender Rhodes, horn arrangements
- Bill Stewart – drums

=== Additional musicians ===
- Bill Payne – synthesizer, keyboards
- Fred Beckmeier, Red Callender – bass guitar
- Dr. John – piano, clavinet
- Victor Feldman, Milt Holland – percussion
- David Luell – horn, saxophone
- Steve Madaio, Pat Rizzo – horn
- Venetta Fields – background vocals
- Clydie King – background vocals
- Sherlie Matthews – background vocals
- Nick DeCaro - string and horn arrangements, conductor
- Marty Paich - string and horn arrangement, conductor on "Brightest Smile in Town"
- Harry Bluestone, Sid Sharp - concertmaster

=== Technical ===
- Noel Newbolt, Sue Haverback, Tori Hammond - production assistance
- Diana Marie Kaylan - art direction
- David Alexander - photography
