= Midnight Rider (film) =

Unfinished American biographical film

- Directed by: Randall Miller
- Screenplay by: Randall Miller; Jody Savin
- Based on: My Cross to Bear by Gregg Allman
- Produced by: Randall Miller; Jody Savin
- Starring: William Hurt; Tyson Ritter; Zoey Deutch; Eliza Dushku; Wyatt Russell
- Cinematography: Mike Ozier
- Production companies: Film Allman LLC; Unclaimed Freight Productions
- Distributed by: Open Road Films
- Country: United States
- Language: English

Midnight Rider, also known as Midnight Rider: The Gregg Allman Story, is a cancelled American biographical drama film. Director Randall Miller co-wrote the screenplay with Jody Savin, based on the autobiography My Cross to Bear by the singer Gregg Allman. Miller and Savin were also the producers. The film was to star William Hurt, Tyson Ritter, Zoey Deutch, Eliza Dushku, and Wyatt Russell.

On February 20, 2014, the first day of filming, the crew was on an active railroad trestle bridge, high over the Altamaha River in Wayne County, Georgia. Second assistant camerawoman Sarah Jones was killed when she was struck by a CSX freight train that arrived on the trestle. Seven other crew members were also injured, one seriously. Production was suspended the following week and multiple investigations into the incident were undertaken. Miller, Savin, executive producer Jay Sedrish, and first assistant director Hillary Schwartz were charged with involuntary manslaughter and criminal trespass. On March 9, 2015, Miller pled guilty to felony involuntary manslaughter and criminal trespassing and received a 10-year sentence, of which he served one year, followed by probation. Sedrish was also convicted of felony involuntary manslaughter and criminal trespassing via a plea bargain and sentenced to 10 years of probation. The charges against Savin were dropped as part of the plea agreement with her husband and business partner Randall Miller.

Film Allman LLC, referenced in multiple lawsuits, is the production company created by Randall Miller, Jody Savin and Brad Rosenberger in the state of Georgia specifically for the production of Midnight Rider. Unclaimed Freight Productions is Miller and Savin's parent California production company.

== Cast ==
- William Hurt as Gregg Allman
  - Tyson Ritter as young Gregg Allman
- Zoey Deutch as Mae
- Eliza Dushku as Rita
- Wyatt Russell as Duane Allman
- Bradley Whitford as Michael Lehman
- Joel David Moore as Bill McEuen
- Chad Lindberg as Joseph L. Campbell
- Charles S. Dutton as Chank Middleton
- Aldis Hodge
- Kathy Baker

== Development ==
On May 18, 2013, it was announced that Open Road Films, Randall Miller and Jody Savin planned to film a biopic based on Gregg Allman's autobiography My Cross to Bear. Miller was announced as the director and co-writer of the screenplay with Savin.

When Open Road Films was announced as the US distribution partner this was a substantial boost to the independent production, as it is owned by AMC Theatres and Regal Entertainment Group, and thus at the time could directly distribute to approximately 31% of the nation's theaters. Open Road Films' Tom Ortenberg said, "We are thrilled to have the opportunity to be a part of this movie. Gregg Allman's story is fascinating and we are looking forward to working with Randall, Jody and Gregg to bring this project to theaters." Miller and Savin would produce, along with their business partner Brad Rosenberger, and work closely with Allman and his manager Michael Lehman, who would serve as executive producers.

The name of the film was announced as Midnight Rider: The Gregg Allman Story on November 1, 2013, and was followed with promotional artwork, a Facebook page, and casting calls using that title.

== Death of Sarah Jones ==
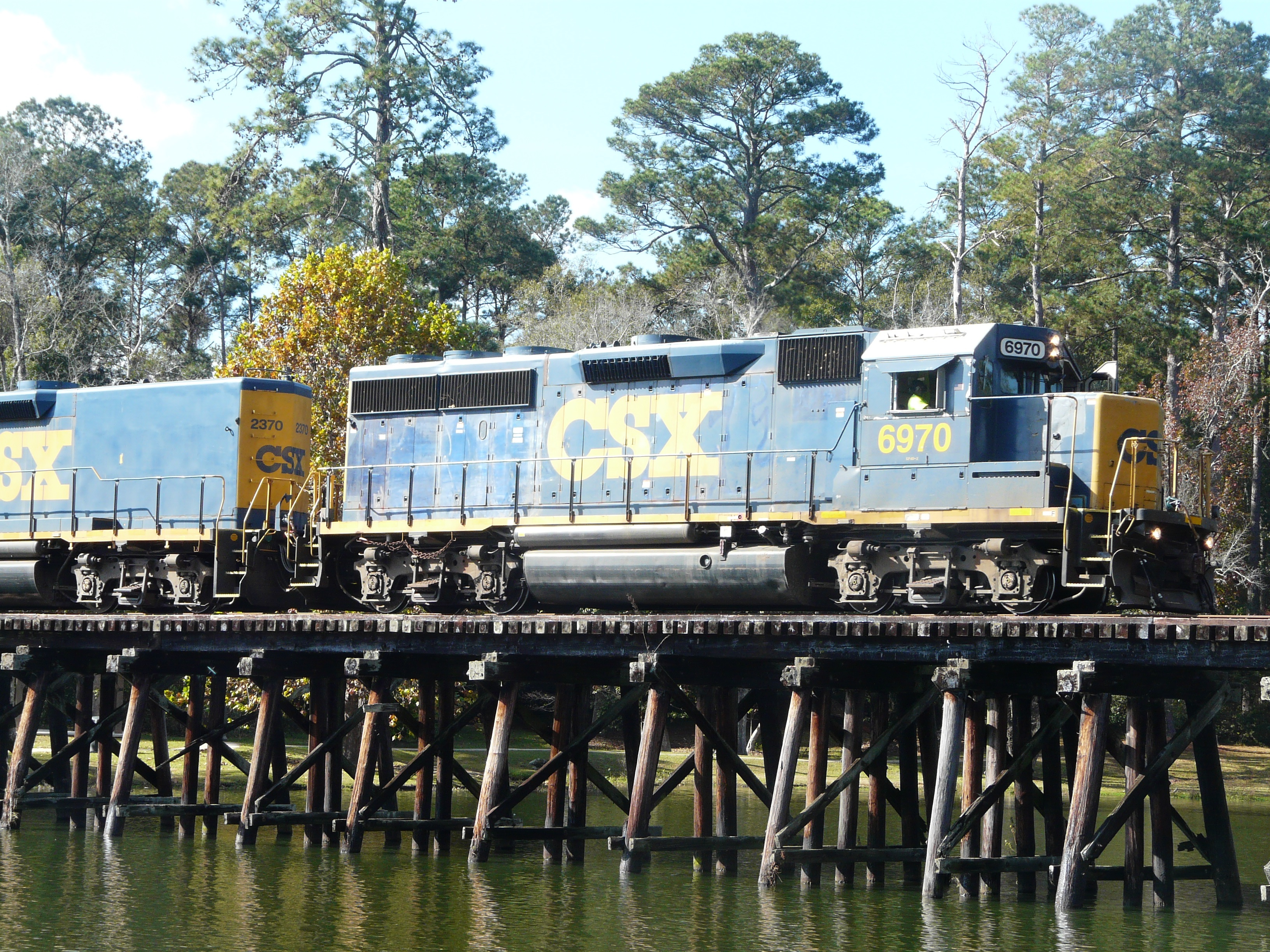
A railroad trestle bridge on Western and Atlantic Railroad in Cherokee Lake, Georgia carrying a CSX train in 2020

On Thursday, February 20, 2014, the film crew was transported an hour from Meddin Studios to a remote location for a "camera test". They had permission to film on property that was secured by fencing, owned by Rayonier for mill operations. Running through this property was CSX railroad property, which included Wayne County's historic Doctortown railroad trestle. CSX claims that the production asked twice for permission to use its property, and was denied both times in writing. Sergeant Ben Robertson later wrote in an incident report, "In my presence, Mr. Sedrish was asked by an employee of CSX if he had permission to be on the trestle or tracks and Mr. Sedrish replied, 'That's complicated.'"

Under Miller's direction, the crew prepared and started filming a dream sequence involving William Hurt as Allman on a heavy, metal hospital bed on a live railroad trestle, high above the Altamaha River. The producers had assured the cast and crew that it was safe to film on the trestle. Even though official shooting of the film was scheduled to begin on February 24, in and around Savannah, and February 20 had been called a camera test, it seems that the producers intended to shoot a substantial scene without the full crew.

While they were filming, a CSX freight train came around a curve at 58 mph (93 km/h; 26 m/s), giving the cast and crew less than a minute to evacuate the filming location, a substantial way out onto the trestle. The only escape route was toward the oncoming train. Video of the crew indicates that they were unaware how fast it was approaching; some attempted to remove camera equipment and the metal bed from the trestle. They failed to remove the bed before the train rolled through, and many of the crew were trapped on the trestle. The train struck and shattered the metal bed, sending shrapnel toward crew members. Fragments struck camera assistant Sarah Jones and propelled her toward the still fast-moving train, killing her instantly. Hurt, who was to be lying on the hospital bed in the scene, got off the trestle before the train hit the bed, collecting splinters on his bare feet as he ran across the ties, and then onto sharp rocks on the shore. Several other crew members were injured and taken to the hospital, such as hair stylist Joyce Gilliard, who suffered a fractured arm.

The trestle the film crew was on is a historic bridge crossing the Altamaha River in Wayne County where the Battle of Altamaha Bridge took place. According to the NTSB preliminary report, the train was traveling at 58 mph (93 km/h; 26 m/s) and the speed limit for this section of track was 70 mph (110 km/h; 31 m/s). On February 21, sheriff's deputies identified the deceased as Jones, and confirmed that seven others were injured in the incident.

Executive producer Nick Gant, creative director and principal of Meddin Studios, denied any wrongdoing or negligence in the incident, told Variety that the crew was extremely well qualified, and blamed the railway company for the mishap. On February 24, the Wayne County Sheriff's Office released an incident report that said the production company had been denied permission by CSX to film on the trestle. The investigation was later expanded to include the Occupational Safety and Health Administration, the National Transportation Safety Board, the Federal Railroad Administration and the Georgia Bureau of Investigation, investigating Jones's death as a negligent homicide.

=== Attempts to restart filming after the incident ===
Producers had intended to continue filming immediately following the tragedy, evidenced by their request for new film permits from the city of Savannah, but on February 26, 2014, Film Allman, LLC announced that the production was on hold due to Jones's death and the injuries to crew members. Miller hired public relations strategist Matthew Hiltzik, of Hiltzik Strategies, on February 27, to address the negative press coverage. On April 14, 2014, it was reported that Miller was planning to resume filming in Los Angeles in June 2014.

On April 17, the International Alliance of Theatrical Stage Employees said that Unclaimed Freight Productions had notified them that they would begin pre-production "in a couple weeks", but that the company "did not ask for permission and was not granted permission to restart production". IATSE also said, "As uncomfortable as this is, we cannot prevent them from starting up again. Whether or not they can get people to work for them is a decision that those people will have to make for themselves."

In response to Miller's and Savin's decision to resume filming, film crews that had remained largely silent on the details of pending criminal investigations mounted a very vocal protest against the production company and asked Allman, Open Road Films, Hurt and other actors to withdraw their support for the film. The greatest concern was that despite what seemed to be the production company's negligence, resulting in serious injuries and a death, there was no federal, state or union entity that could prevent them from resuming production. A Facebook group of crew members voicing opposition had grown to more than 10,800 members by April 23 when Hurt announced he was leaving the film.

Hurt, who was scripted to be lying on the metal bed in the scene, wrote in an email to a friend that the production crew had twice assured him that the bridge scene was safe to film. In a personal letter Allman released to the press on April 25, he asked the producers not to proceed with the film, writing, "Your desires as a filmmaker should not outweigh your obligations as a human being, I am asking you to do the right thing and to set aside your attempts to resume the production out of respect for Sarah, her family and the loss that all of us feel so deeply." Allman later filed a civil suit against Miller and Savin in an attempt to halt the film. Open Road Films has yet to withdraw their support for it.

== Criminal and civil actions ==
=== Criminal case and convictions ===
Miller, Savin, and Sedrish were charged with involuntary manslaughter and criminal trespass on July 3, 2014. Miller and Savin originally pleaded not guilty. On September 10, 2014, Hillary Schwartz, the first assistant director of Midnight Rider, was charged with involuntary manslaughter and criminal trespassing.

On March 9, 2015, just before the trial was to commence, the DA agreed to plea bargains for two of the defendants. Miller and Sedrish entered guilty pleas to felony involuntary manslaughter and criminal trespassing, while charges were dropped against Savin as part of Miller's plea.

Miller received a sentence of 10 years, of which he was expected to serve two years in prison followed by probation (during which he would be precluded from working as a director or assistant director or other capacity involving employee safety) as well as pay a fine and do community service. He was immediately remanded to custody after the plea hearing to begin serving his sentence in the Wayne County jail. He was released in March 2016 after serving one year of his term.

Sedrish was sentenced to 10 years' probation and a fine, and is likewise precluded from working as a director or assistant director or other capacity involving employee safety. On March 10, 2015, Schwartz pleaded guilty to felony involuntary manslaughter and criminal trespass, and was also sentenced to 10 years' probation.

=== Civil lawsuits ===
==== Gregg Allman v. Unclaimed Freight Productions et al. ====
In an attempt to halt Miller's and Savin's effort to resume filming Midnight Rider, Allman, the subject of the film and executive producer, filed suit on April 28, 2014, in Chatham County Superior Court. He claimed that Miller and Savin had failed to pay the agreed option price for the film rights or to start primary photography by the date stipulated in the option contract. After one day of court proceedings that included Miller testifying, the trial ended when Allman's and Miller's attorneys agreed to an out-of-court settlement. Nothing has been publicly revealed about this settlement.

==== Richard Jones and Elisabeth Jones v. CSX Transportation and Unknown Corporations ====
Richard and Elisabeth Jones, Sarah's parents, filed a wrongful death lawsuit on Sarah's behalf against CSX, the film's producers, and related companies and individuals, on May 21, 2014, in Chatham County, Georgia, where the production was based. The complaint alleged that the defendants "had knowledge, actual or constructive, that the scene filmed on February 20 was to take place on active railroad tracks, without permission from CSX" and that they "knew of the danger presented by filming under those circumstances." In reply, CSX stated that it had repeatedly denied the producers permission to use its property and railroad trestle. It also revealed that its employees on two previous CSX trains saw the film crew congregating near CSX's property where there is also a railroad crossing. The Joneses' attorneys contended that given these warning signs CSX should have slowed the train and sent an investigator to the site. The Joneses settled with a number of parties before trial. Defendants CSX, Meddin Studios, and Jeffery Gant remained in the trial.

In July 2017, a jury awarded the Joneses $11.2 million. Liability for $3.9 million was allocated to CSX, $3.14 million to Miller, and $2 million to Rayonier Performance Fibers, the company that owned the land where the tracks were; the remaining liability was allocated to Savin, Schwartz and Serdish. CSX appealed and ultimately settled with the Joneses for an undisclosed lesser amount while the appeal was pending.

==== Film Allman LLC v. New York Marine Insurance ====
On August 12, 2014, Film Allman LLC filed a lawsuit against New York Marine Insurance contending that if it did not receive the $1.6 million insurance payout for the interruption caused by the collision, it would be unable to continue with the production. The lawsuit also revealed that it had rewritten the script, and submitted it to the insurance carrier, to be about 1970s rock music in general, not specifically about Allman. This revelation, along with Allman's undisclosed out-of-court settlement with Film Allman LLC, raised substantial questions about whether the film would still be a "Gregg Allman biopic", based on his autobiography. The insurance policy has a clear stipulation that the insured must adhere to all safety standards and laws to prevent loss, but OSHA cited Film Allman LLC for putting its crew at risk both of falls from the trestle, a "serious citation", and of being struck by a train, a "willful citation", in addition to criminal indictments of the three managing producers and first AD for criminal trespassing and involuntary manslaughter.

== Federal NTSB, OSHA and FRA investigations, citations and reports ==
=== NTSB investigation ===
On March 23, 2015, the National Transportation Safety Board adopted a final report that cited the probable cause of the accident as "the film crew's unauthorized entry onto the CSX Transportation right-of-way at the Altamaha River bridge with personnel and equipment, despite CSX Transportation's repeated denial of permission to access the railroad property. Contributing to the accident was the adjacent property owner's actions to facilitate the film crew's access to the right-of-way and bridge."

=== OSHA citations of Film Allman LLC ===
OSHA issued a $74,600 fine to Miller's production company, with Miller appealing the fine directly to OSHA's review board; the board declined to overturn the penalty. Miller appealed the board's decision to a panel (three judges) of the Eleventh Circuit Court of Appeals which again upheld the fine. Miller further appealed to the Eleventh Circuit for an en banc (all judges of the court) hearing. The Eleventh Circuit would affirm the previous judgements and ultimately upheld the fine in 2017.

=== FRA statement on investigation ===
On October 15, 2014, the Federal Railroad Administration said it was still investigating the collision. A spokesperson said, "The FRA is investigating the February 20, 2014 accident that occurred on the CSX rail line in Nahunta, Georgia. Once completed, the investigation will identify the root cause of the accident, and we will take all appropriate enforcement actions."

=== National Council on Occupational Safety and Health report ===
In its annual report, the National Council on Occupational Safety and Health (COSH) cited Sarah Jones as one of seven case studies of workplace deaths that could have been prevented. Hairstylist Joyce Gilliard, also injured in the collision, spoke about the report on a conference call with reporters and separately said in a statement, "After what I saw and lived through, I want to advocate for safety and prevent any other tragedies or injuries in the workplace."

== Legacy ==
=== Slick Rock Trail ===
On October 2, 2014, it was revealed that Miller was in pre-production for a film called Slick Rock Trail and working with casting director Rick Pagano of Pagano/Manwiller Casting. Pagano had also worked with Miller as casting director on Midnight Rider, CBGB, Noble Son and Bottle Shock. It seems the film had similarities to Midnight Rider, including a line from Allman's book that is also a commonly quoted line from the Allman Brothers band's origin story, calling a band with two drummers as a potential train wreck. It was unclear whether the Slick Rock Trail script was the same one Miller presented as a rewrite of Midnight Rider in his lawsuit against New York Marine Insurance.

=== Safety for Sarah movement ===
In the wake of Jones' death, her family, friends, supporters and others in the film industry launched a campaign for greater awareness and attention to safety issues in film and television productions.

== See also ==
- List of film accidents
- Twilight Zone accident
- Rust shooting incident
