= Searching for Simplicity =

Studio album by Gregg Allman
- Released: November 11, 1997
- Genre: Southern rock; blues
- Length: 53:24
- Label: 550
- Producer: Tom Dowd; Johnny Sandlin

Gregg Allman chronology
| One More Try: An Anthology (1997) | Searching for Simplicity (1997) | Low Country Blues (2011) |

Searching for Simplicity is the sixth studio album by the American singer-songwriter Gregg Allman, released on November 11, 1997, by 550 Music. The album is mainly composed of cover songs associated with Ray Charles, James Carr, and Jimmy Hughes, as well as originals.

== Background ==
The album was produced by Tom Dowd, who worked extensively with the Allman Brothers, and Johnny Sandlin, who co-produced Allman's first solo album, Laid Back. The idea to record a new version of "Whipping Post" came from longtime Allman Brothers roadie Red Dog, who suggested it after the success of Eric Clapton's version of "Layla" on MTV Unplugged. While recording "The Dark End of the Street"—once his brother Duane's favorite song—he had to stop and go outside because he was tearing up.

The album came on the heels of Allman quitting drugs and alcohol, and the album's title reflected his search "for a more simple life." He was nearly complete with the recording process, which spanned two and a half years, when he quit substances altogether. In all, he completed 20 songs for the project, but felt some were not as good as others. He cut the track listing down from there, but then decided it was too short. Near the end of the process, he went to Fantasy Studios in Berkeley, California with Tom Dowd to record two new songs, a cover of "Memphis in the Meantime" and an original, "Startin' Over".

The photo on the cover is of Allman at age 15.

== Reception ==
Professional ratings
Review scores
| Source | Rating |
|---|---|
| AllMusic | 3/5 stars |
| Rolling Stone Album Guide | 3/5 stars |

William Ruhlmann of AllMusic gave the album three stars, writing that the "album finds him growling through standard-issue blues-rock, some of the songs originals, some covers." Biographer Alan Paul, who wrote 2014's One Way Out: The Inside History of the Allman Brothers Band, called it Allman's "finest new solo work since Laid Back."

== Track listing ==
All tracks composed by Gregg Allman; except where indicated

1. "Whipping Post" – 4:41
2. "House of Blues" – 4:00
3. "Come Back and Help Me" (Allman and Jack Pearson) – 3:35
4. "Silence Ain't Golden Anymore" – 3:33
5. "Rendezvous with the Blues" (Johnny Douglas and Jimmy Hall) – 3:53
6. "Wolf's A-Howlin'" – 4:14
7. "Love the Poison" (G. Nicholson and W. Wilson) – 3:29
8. "Don't Deny Me" (J. L. Williams) – 4:37
9. "The Dark End of the Street" (Chips Moman and Dan Penn) – 3:16
10. "Neighbor, Neighbor" (Huey P. Meaux) – 3:55
11. "I've Got News for You" (Ray Alfred and Roy Alfred) – 4:37
12. "Memphis in the Meantime" (John Hiatt) – 3:43
13. "Startin' Over" – 5:51
