= Great As Ever: Live in Philadelphia '86 =

Live album by Gregg Allman Band
- Released: April 10, 2026
- Recorded: January 11, 1986
- Venue: Chestnut Cabaret
- Genre: Rock
- Label: Sawrite Records

Gregg Allman chronology
One Night in DC: May 15, 1984 (2025)	Great As Ever: Live in Philadelphia '86 (2026)

Great As Ever: Live in Philadelphia '86 is an album by the Gregg Allman Band. It was recorded at the Chestnut Cabaret in Philadelphia on January 11, 1986. The third in a series of live archival albums of music by Gregg Allman, it was released on April 10, 2026.

== Critical reception ==
In Glide Magazine, Doug Collette said, "With the release of Great As Ever: Live In Philadelphia '86, a theme is beginning to emerge in the chronological issues of this archival series. Notwithstanding how this package lives up to its title – it's actually a reference to the loyalty of the audience from the leader of the band – Gregg Allman's self-assurance and pride in his work is too obvious to ignore throughout the third edition of concert recordings from the late Southerner's vault..."

In Rock & Blues Muse, Hal Horowitz wrote, "Great As Ever, with its lack of overdubs or sweetening, is an enjoyably unvarnished example of the Gregg Allman Band's talents as they became an even tighter, more focused unit. The repetition [of some songs from the previous album] won't bother longtime fans as previously unavailable performances excavate and revisit worthy obscurities with the verve and integrity he always demonstrated."

In Bourbon and Vinyl, Kenneth Corsini wrote, "Of the three of these live vault releases, Great As Ever is now my favorite. The band just sounds better here. Maybe it's the fact that they had a record deal and were working on an album, but the performance here just feels more confident. Not that Gregg ever lacked confidence on a stage."

== Track listing ==
1. "Don't Want You No More" (Spencer Davis, Eddie Hardin) – 2:46
2. "It's Not My Cross to Bear" (Gregg Allman) – 5:29
3. "Sweet Feelin'" (Clarence Carter, Marcus Daniel, Rick Hall, Candi Staton) – 4:47
4. "Hot 'Lanta" (Duane Allman, Gregg Allman, Dickey Betts, Jai Johanny Johanson, Berry Oakley, Butch Trucks) – 4:33
5. "Need Your Love So Bad" (William Edward John, Mertis John Jr.) – 6:08
6. "Trouble No More" (McKinley Morganfield) – 3:42
7. "Things You Used to Do" (Gregg Allman, Keith England) – 5:02
8. "Queen of Hearts" (Gregg Allman) – 7:51
9. "Melissa" (Gregg Allman, Stephen Alaimo) – 6:28
10. "Midnight Rider" (Gregg Allman, Robert Kim Payne) – 4:19
11. "Just Ain't Easy" (Gregg Allman) – 6:54
12. "I'm No Angel" (Tony Colton, Phil Palmer) – 4:04

== Personnel ==
Gregg Allman Band

- Gregg Allman – lead vocals, Hammond B-3 organ, acoustic guitar
- Dan Toler – guitar
- Frankie Toler – drums
- Tim Heding – keyboards, vocals
- Bruce Waibel – bass, vocals
- Chaz Trippy – percussion

Production

- Original recording produced by Gregg Allman
- Executive producers: Michael Lehman, Devon Allman
- Engineering: Tim Pace
- Mastering: Jason Nesmith
- Art direction, design: Charley Robinson
