= Two the Hard Way =

1977 album by Gregg Allman and Cher

Studio album by Allman and Woman
- Released: November 1977
- Recorded: 1976–1977
- Studios: Record Plant, Los Angeles; Sunset Sound, Hollywood; Record Plant, New York City; Wally Heider, San Francisco
- Genre: Pop rock
- Length: 38:35
- Label: Warner Bros.
- Producers: Gregg Allman; Johnny Sandlin; John Haeny

Cher chronology
| Cherished (1977) | Two the Hard Way (1977) | Take Me Home (1979) |

Gregg Allman chronology
| Playin' Up a Storm (1977) | Two the Hard Way (1977) | I'm No Angel (1987) |

Singles from Two the Hard Way
- 1. "Move Me" Released: 1977; 2. "You've Really Got a Hold On Me" Released: 1977

Two the Hard Way is a collaborative studio album by American singer and actress Cher (credited as "Woman") and American singer and keyboardist Gregg Allman. It was released in November 1977 by Warner Bros. Records. The album, billed to Allman and Woman, was a critical and commercial failure.

== History ==
In conjunction with the release of the album Cher and Allman did a 21-show tour called the "Two the Hard Way Tour", consisting of seven shows in Japan and 14 in Europe. The tour ended abruptly when Cher parted ways with Allman and returned to the United States.

The album was never officially re-issued on CD or 8-track, although it has been bootlegged. In 2008, Billboard correspondent Keith Caulfield stated that Cher owned the rights to the master tapes of this album (as well as three solo albums she made in the mid-1970s) and hence she would have to approve any reissues. The song "Can You Fool" was included in the 1989 Allman Brothers compilation album Dreams, which is still in print.

For many years "Can You Fool" was the only Allman and Woman song to have been officially made available online. However, on October 8, 2021, Cher released all 11 tracks, "restored and remastered", on her YouTube channel. A few days later, she also released several live videos produced in November 1977 for the BBC TV series The Old Grey Whistle Test.

== Singles ==
"Move Me" was released as the first single with "Love Me" as its b-side. Record World described the song as "a melodic, up-tempo soul tune, powered by brass and two distinctive vocals", noting that the singers "test the pop waters" with their collaboration. On December 3, 1977, Billboard recommended the single in the "Top Single Picks" section.

== Critical reception ==
Professional ratings
Review scores
| Source | Rating |
|---|---|
| AllMusic | 1/5 stars |
| The Encyclopedia of Popular Music | 1/5 stars |
| MusicHound Rock: The Essential Album Guide | 1/5 stars |
| The Rolling Stone Record Guide | 0/5 stars |

The album was generally panned by critics. Rolling Stone stated that although the concept "is perfect", Cher and Gregg Allman "aren't really singers at all, but media personalities", arguing that "neither of them has enough voice" for the material. The Toledo Blade wrote that Cher and Gregg Allman "set out in a field foreign to both — rhythm and blues", and concluding that "they match rather well — one's as bad as the other", with the vocals described as a "monumental groaner". The Walrus! wrote that Cher "is a super singer" and Gregg Allman "a super rock 'n' roller", but concluding that "the two audiences are incompatible. But, isn't that the story of their whole relationship?". The Rolling Stone Record Guide wrote: "It's hard to imagine a more inappropriate combination... It's the bottom of the barrel after a long fall for Gregg, and more of the same for Cher." The guide gave the album zero stars, rating it "Worthless".

On the other hand, Cash Box was more cordial, explaining that "there were some complications in the meantime, as the title perhaps alludes to, but the end result is all you could ever hope for in a collaboration from these two unique musical performers," and concluding that "it's a very personal and moving album, and if there is an anthem, it might just be the gritty "We're Gonna Make It," which we hope is prophetic." Record World, for their part, included the album on the "Album Picks" list on November 19, 1977, and considered the collaboration to be "more in the bluesy vein of the Allman Brothers than what one might expect from Cher". They also highlighted the song "You've Really Got A Hold On Me", saying that it finds both singers "trading verses and breathing new life into the Smokey Robinson classic".

== Track listing ==
Side one
| No. | Title | Writer(s) | Length |
|---|---|---|---|
| 1. | "Move Me" | Fred Beckmeier; Vella M. Cameron; Steve Beckmeier; Jimmie Cameron | 2:58 |
| 2. | "I Found You Love" | Alan Gordon | 3:58 |
| 3. | "Can You Fool" | Micheal Smotherman | 3:21 |
| 4. | "You've Really Got a Hold on Me" | Smokey Robinson | 3:18 |
| 5. | "We're Gonna Make It" | Billy Davis; Carl Smith; Raynard Miner; Gene Barge | 3:15 |
| 6. | "Do What You Gotta Do" | Jimmy Webb | 3:26 |

Side two
| No. | Title | Writer(s) | Length |
|---|---|---|---|
| 1. | "In for the Night" | Ed Sanford; Johnny Townsend | 3:34 |
| 2. | "Shadow Dream Song" (lead vocals by Gregg Allman) | Jackson Browne | 3:43 |
| 3. | "Island" (lead vocals by Cher) | Ilene Rappaport | 4:25 |
| 4. | "I Love Makin' Love to You" | Benjamin Weisman; Evie Sands; Richard Germinero | 3:49 |
| 5. | "Love Me" | Jerry Leiber; Mike Stoller | 2:48 |

== Personnel ==
- Cher – lead vocals, harmony vocals
- Gregg Allman – lead vocals, harmony vocals, organ, producer
- Ricky Hirsch, John Leslie Hug, Fred Tackett, Scott Boyer – guitar
- Willie Weeks – bass
- Neil Larsen – piano, electric piano, clavinet, organ
- Randall Bramblett, Harvey Thompson, Ronnie Eades – saxophone
- Harrison Calloway, Jim Horn – horn
- Ben Cauley – trumpet, flugelhorn
- Dennis Good – trombone
- Mickey Raphael – harmonica
- Bobbye Hall – percussion
- Bill Stewart – drums
- Clydie King, Doug Hayward, Pat Henderson, Russell Morris, Sherlie Matthews, Tim Schmit – backing vocals
- Jimmy Webb – string and horn arrangements on "We're Gonna Make It" and "Do What You Gotta Do"
- Ed Freeman – string arrangements
- Sid Sharp – concertmaster

Technical

- Johnny Sandlin – producer
- John Haeny – producer on "You Really Got a Hold On Me" and "Do What You Gotta Do"
- Tom Flye – engineer
- David Pinkston – engineer
- John Cabalka – art direction
- Brad Kanawyer – design
- Bob Jacobs – artwork, photo hand tinting
- Harry Langdon – photography
