= The Allman Joys =

Musical group

The Allman Joys was an early rock band fronted by brothers Duane and Gregg Allman. It was originally the Escorts, but it eventually evolved into the Allman Joys. Duane Allman quit high school to spend his days at home practicing guitar. They auditioned for Bob Dylan's producer, Bob Johnston, at Columbia Records, backing a girl trio called The Sandpipers. Eventually, they went on to form the group Hour Glass and then the Allman Brothers Band.

== Members ==
- Gregg Allman - organ, lead vocals
- Duane Allman - lead guitar, vocals
- Bobby Dennis - rhythm guitar
- Jack Jackson - rhythm guitar
- Mabron McKinney - bass guitar
- Ralph Bollinger - bass guitar
- Bill Connell - drums
- Bob Keller - bass guitar
- Ronnie Wilkins - piano
- Charlie Winkler - guitar
- Allison Miner - vocals
- Maynard Portwood - drums
- Doug Montague - bass guitar
- Mike Alexander - bass guitar
- George Henderson - bass guitar

== History ==
From the back of the Early Allman compilation (Allman Joys - Early Allman):

One quiet Nashville evening back in '66, songwriter John D. Loudermilk walked into a small club called the Briar Patch. Up on the bandstand was what looked like just another of the thousands of teen age rock bands of the era. When they started to play, Loudermilk could tell they weren't so typical after all. The two front men were both blond and very intense. One played a trebly, stinging slide guitar; the other sang in an anguished, world-weary voice. John D. wondered how it was that these two looked so young yet played with so much experience. Needless to say, he was very interested in the group, which called themselves the Allman Joys. Allman was the surname of the two blond brothers, Duane and Gregg, who led the band. Although he'd never produced before, Loudermilk decided to take the group into the studio and cut some sides on them.

One of the Allman Joys' sides, "Spoonful", was released locally and sold well. But Loudermilk had already decided to concentrate on song writing, so he brought the group to Buddy Killen, head of Dial Records. Killen thought the group was quite good, so he had John Hurley take them into the studio to record more tunes.

"They were really way ahead of their times, I realize now", Killen says. "Nobody really understood what Duane and Gregg were all about at the time. Eventually I gave them their release and they went to California, leaving these tapes behind." Duane and Gregg Allman went on to form Hour Glass and the Allman Brothers Band.

Note: Loudermilk's memory is slightly inaccurate, since Duane did not learn to play slide guitar until his birthday in 1968, a couple of years later.

== Discography ==
Early Allman (recorded in 1966, released in 1973)
