= Slip Away (Clarence Carter song) =

- Japan picture sleeve

Single by Clarence Carter

from the album This Is Clarence Carter
- B-side: "Funky Fever"
- Released: April 1968
- Recorded: 1967
- Studio: FAME Studios
- Genre: Southern soul; blues
- Length: 2:40
- Label: Atlantic
- Songwriters: William Armstrong, Marcus Daniel, Wilbur Terrell
- Producer: Rick Hall

Clarence Carter singles chronology
"Looking for a Fox" (1967)	"Slip Away" (1968)	"Too Weak to Fight" (1968)

"Slip Away" is a song written by William Armstrong, Marcus Daniel, and Wilbur Terrell and performed by Clarence Carter, featured on the 1968 album This Is Clarence Carter.

== Original version ==
=== Composition ===
In its musical structure and theme (of infidelity), "Slip Away" would seem based on the template of "Steal Away", the 1964 self-penned Jimmy Hughes hit which had been the first single recorded at FAME Studios. The official songwriting credit for "Slip Away" lists three musicians from Clarence Carter's touring band: keyboardist William Armstrong, bassist Marcus Daniel, and drummer Wilbur Terrell.

Marcus Daniel, Carter's sideman since 1962, had previously co-written - with Carter and Wilbur Terrell - "Tell Daddy" which, after becoming Carter's inaugural R&B hit at the start of 1967, would - as "Tell Mama" - be recorded by Etta James that summer to become an R&B Top Ten R&B hit and Top 40 crossover. Daniel would nevertheless recall that in 1967 he had been feeling uneasy about his musical career:(Marcus Miller 2008 quote:)"I got down on my knees and asked God to allow me to do better" - as a songwriter and musician - "and stay with the band, and within twenty minutes I sat up in bed with both the melody and the lyrics of 'Slip Away' in my mind." Commenting on the arguable incongruity of a divinely inspired song being focused on infidelity, Marcus Daniel would state: "I wrote about what I knew":"back then...I was a bad womanizer, which...shames to this day": in 1988 Daniel would leave his musical career behind, serving as pastor of the Piney Groves Missionary Baptist Church in Mathews, Alabama until his 10 May 2021 passing.

Clarence Carter would in 2009 have a somewhat contrasting recollection of the song's genesis: "My bass player had written some lyrics...and he and I sat down and really put 'Slip Away' together."

=== Recording/ release ===
"Slip Away", arranged and produced by Rick Hall, was recorded at FAME Studios in a mid-1967 recording session whose players, besides vocalist Clarence Carter himself on guitar, included visiting American Sound Studio (Memphis) session regulars Spooner Oldham on keyboards and David Hood whose bass riffs on the track would become iconic in the canon of Southern soul: other session players included drummer Roger Hawkins and - in one of his first session jobs - Duane Allman on guitar. Despite the track's credentials, Rick Hall decided against releasing "Slip Away": that the track would eventually serve as the B-side of the April 1968 single release "Funky Fever" was according to Carter his own suggestion, made in the hopes that "Slip Away" would prove to be a "flip hit".

=== Impact ===
As Clarence Carter had hoped, it would indeed transpire that as "Funky Fever" ended its comparatively unimpressive chart run - reaching #49 on the U.S. R&B chart and #88 on the U.S. pop chart- in June 1968, "Slip Away" would "breakout" as a "flip hit" in Cincinnati, becoming Carter's first Top 40 hit on the Billboard Hot 100 for the week ending 17 August 1968 on its way to a #6 peak in October, which is the month it reached its R&B chart peak of #2 (behind James Brown's "Say It Loud – I'm Black and I'm Proud"), "Slip Away" already having been certified gold for sales of one million units in September.Billboard's year-end charts would rank "Slip Away" as the #44 biggest pop hit of 1968, and as the #2 R&B hit of 1968 (again, behind James Brown's "Say It Loud – I'm Black and I'm Proud").

RPM, the music industry journal for Canada, would rank "Slip Away" as high as #12 on its national 100 single survey.

== Other charting versions ==
- Dottsy released a version of the song as a single in 1979 which reached #22 on the U.S. country chart and #27 on the Canadian country chart.
- Gregg Allman released a version of the song as a single in 1988 which reached #17 on the U.S. rock chart. It was featured on his album Just Before the Bullets Fly.

== Other versions ==
- Hank Ballard released a version of the song on his 1968 album You Can't Keep a Good Man Down.
- Eddie Floyd released a version of the song on his 1968 album I've Never Found a Girl.
- Don Bryant released a version of the song on his 1969 album Precious Soul.
- Tyrone Davis released a version of the song on his 1969 album Can I Change My Mind.
- Barbara Lewis released a version of the song on her 1970 album The Many Grooves of Barbara Lewis.
- O. B. McClinton remade "Slip Away" for his 1972 album release O. B. McClinton Country.
- Travis Wammack remade "Slip Away" for his 1972 self-title album: the B-side to the Billboard Hot 100 single "Whatever Turns You On" (#95), the track was - like the Clarence Carter original - produced by Rick Hall at FAME Studios.
- Narvel Felts released a version of the song on his 1975 album Narvel Felts.
- Juice Newton & Silver Spur released a version of the song on their 1976 album After the Dust Settles.
- Billy Price and The Keystone Rhythm Band released a version of the song on their 1979 album Is It Over?
- Dee Clark remade "Slip Away" for his 1982 album Hey Little Girl.
- Cassell Webb released a version of the song on her 1989 album Songs of a Stranger.
- Dobie Gray remade "Slip Away" for his 1998 album release Diamond Cuts.
- Slim Smith released a version of the song on his 2000 compilation album A Unique Technique - Classic Rocksteady and Reggae 1968-72.
- Carla Olson & The Textones released a version of the song on their 2008 compilation album Detroit '85 Live & Unreleased.
- Armand Schaubroeck Steals released a version of the song on their 2014 album God Made the Blues to Kill Me!

== In popular culture ==
- The song was featured on the soundtrack for the 1991 film The Commitments.
- Carter's version was featured on the soundtrack of the 2000 film Wonder Boys.
- Carter's version was featured on the soundtrack of the 2000 film Almost Famous.
- Carter's version was featured in the 2006 Cold Case episode "Forever Blue".
- Carter’s version was featured in the fifth episode of season two of the British TV series Sex Education (2020).
- Carter's version was featured in the 2021 film Licorice Pizza.
- Carter's version was featured in the 2024 film Fly Me to the Moon.
