= Gregg Allman Live: Back to Macon, GA =

Live album by Gregg Allman
- Released: August 7, 2015
- Recorded: January 14, 2014
- Genre: Southern rock; blues
- Length: 89:57
- Label: Rounder
- Producer: Gregg Allman; Michael Lehman

Gregg Allman chronology
| Low Country Blues (2011) | Gregg Allman Live: Back to Macon, GA (2015) | Southern Blood (2017) |

Gregg Allman Live: Back to Macon, GA is the second live album by American singer-songwriter Gregg Allman, released on August 7, 2015 by Rounder Records. Recorded at the Grand Opera House in Macon, Georgia, the CD/DVD package showcases Allman's eight-piece solo band.

== Reception ==
The album received critical acclaim. Hal Horowitz of American Songwriter wrote that the record "shows Allman not only hasn't lost any steps musically, but he just may be near the top of his game." Stephen Thomas Erlewine at AllMusic praised the casual nature of the concert, commenting, " there are hits, but not enough for this to be an oldies revue; there are obscurities, but they don't distract; there is virtuosity, but no showboating; there's stylistic diversity, but it feels unified – and that's why it's worth experiencing: it's an old pro whose home is a stage, no matter where that stage is and who happens to be on it."

== Track listing ==
All tracks are written by Gregg Allman, except where noted.

Disc one
| No. | Title | Writer(s) | Length |
|---|---|---|---|
| 1. | "Statesboro Blues" | Blind Willie McTell | 5:25 |
| 2. | "I'm No Angel" | Tony Colton; Phil Palmer | 4:06 |
| 3. | "Queen of Hearts" | | 6:35 |
| 4. | "I Can't Be Satisfied" | McKinley Morganfield | 5:15 |
| 5. | "These Days" | Jackson Browne | 4:02 |
| 6. | "Ain't Wastin' Time No More" | | 6:50 |
| 7. | "Brightest Smile in Town" | Ray Charles; Bob Sherman; Barry De Vorzon | 4:55 |
| 8. | "Hot 'Lanta" | Allman; Duane Allman; Dickey Betts; Berry Oakley; Jaimoe; Butch Trucks | 5:33 |
| 9. | "I've Found a Love" | Wilson Pickett; Willie Schofield; Robert West | 4:39 |

Disc two
| No. | Title | Writer(s) | Length |
|---|---|---|---|
| 1. | "Don't Keep Me Wonderin'" | | 5:11 |
| 2. | "Before the Bullets Fly" | Warren Haynes; John Jaworowicz; Henry Jack Williams | 4:11 |
| 3. | "Melissa" | | 6:19 |
| 4. | "Midnight Rider" | Allman; Robert Kim Payne | 5:10 |
| 5. | "Love Like Kerosene" | Scott Sharrard | 4:42 |
| 6. | "Whipping Post" | | 5:36 |
| 7. | "One Way Out" | Sonny Boy Williamson II; Elmore James; Marshall Sehorn | 11:28 |

== Personnel ==
Musicians

- Gregg Allman – lead vocals, Hammond B-3 organ, guitars
- Scott Sharrard – guitars, vocals
- Ben Stivers – keyboards
- Steve Potts – drums
- Marc Quiñones – percussion, vocals
- Ron Johnson – bass
- Jay Collins – horns
- Art Edmaiston – horns
- Dennis Marion – horns
- Devon Allman – guitar

Production – CD

- Produced by Gregg Allman and Michael Lehman
- Recording: David Barbe
- Assistant engineering: Bob Evans
- Mixing: Seth Presant
- Mastering: Paul Blakemore

Production – DVD

- Executive producers: Keith Wortman, Michael Lehman
- Producers: Keith Wortman, Conor McAnally
- Director: Conor McAnally
- Editor: Brian McCue
- Colorist: Brian Buongiorno
- Production manager and audio engineer: Earl "Big E" McCoy
