= Low Country Blues =

Studio album by Gregg Allman
- Released: January 18, 2011
- Studio: Village Recorder, Los Angeles, California
- Genre: Blues rock
- Length: 52:32
- Label: Rounder
- Producer: T Bone Burnett

Gregg Allman chronology
Searching for Simplicity (1997)	Low Country Blues (2011)	Gregg Allman Live: Back to Macon, GA (2015)

Professional ratings
Review scores
Source	Rating
AllMusic	4/5 stars
Classic Rock	7/10 stars

Low Country Blues is the seventh studio album by Gregg Allman, and the last studio album to be released during his lifetime. It was produced by T Bone Burnett, and was released through Rounder Records on January 18, 2011. The album reached No. 5 on the Billboard 200 and No. 1 on the Top Blues Albums charts, making it Allman's highest-charting album. It was nominated for a 2011 Grammy Award for Best Blues Album.

== Track listing ==
1. "Floating Bridge" (John Adam Estes) – 4:45
2. "Little by Little" (Melvin London) – 2:45
3. "Devil Got My Woman" (Nehemiah "Skip" James) – 4:52
4. "I Can't Be Satisfied" (Muddy Waters) – 3:31
5. "Blind Man" (Don D. Robey, Joseph Wade Scott) – 3:46
6. "Just Another Rider" (Gregg Allman, Warren Haynes) – 5:39
7. "Please Accept My Love" (B.B. King, Sam Ling) – 3:07
8. "I Believe I'll Go Back Home" (Traditional, arranged by Gregg Allman and T Bone Burnett) – 3:49
9. "Tears, Tears, Tears" (Amos Milburn) – 4:54
10. "My Love Is Your Love" (Samuel Maghett) – 4:14
11. "Checking on My Baby" (Otis Rush) – 4:06
12. "Rolling Stone" (Traditional, arranged by Gregg Allman, T Bone Burnett and Mac Rebennack) – 7:04

== Personnel ==
- Gregg Allman – vocals, B3, acoustic guitar
- Doyle Bramhall II – guitar
- T Bone Burnett – producer, guitar on 1, 4, 6, 7, 8, 11
- Hadley Hawkensmith – guitar on "Floating Bridge"
- Vincent Esquer – guitar on "Just Another Rider"
- Mike Compton – mandolin, background vocals on "I Believe I'll go Back Home"
- Colin Linden – Dobro on "Devil Got My Woman", "Rolling Stone"
- Dennis Crouch – double bass
- Dr. John – piano
- Jay Bellerose – drums, percussion
- Lester Lovitt – trumpet on "Blind Man"
- Daniel Fornero – trumpet on "Blind Man"
- Joseph Sublett – tenor saxophone on 5, 6, 7, 9, 11
- Thomas Peterson – baritone saxophone on 5, 6, 7, 9, 11
- Jim Thompson – tenor saxophone on 5, 6, 7, 9, 11
- Darrell Leonard – horn arrangements on 5, 6, 7, 9, 11, bass trumpet on 6, 7, 9, 11 trumpet on 7, 9, 11
- Judith Hill – background vocals on "My Love Is Your Love"
- Alfie Silas-Durio – background vocals on "My Love Is Your Love"
- Tata Vega – background vocals on "My Love Is Your Love"
- Jean Witherspoon – background vocals on "My Love Is Your Love"
- Bill Maxwell – background vocals arrangements on "My Love Is Your Love"

=== Additional personnel ===
- Ivy Skoff – production coordination
- Gavin Lurssen – mastering
- Mike Piersante – engineer, mixing
- Vanessa Parr – 2nd engineer
- Zachary Dawes – 2nd engineer
- Kyle Ford – 2nd engineer
- Jason Wormer – editing
- Emile Kelman – editing
- Paul Ackling – guitar technician
- Danny Clinch – photography
- Larissa Collins – art direction, design

== Charts ==
=== Weekly charts ===
Chart (2011)	Peak position
Austrian Albums (Ö3 Austria)	66
Canadian Albums (Billboard)	12
German Albums (Offizielle Top 100)	83
Norwegian Albums (VG-lista)	23
Scottish Albums (OCC)	50
UK Albums (OCC)	48
US Billboard 200	5
US Top Blues Albums (Billboard)	1
US Top Rock Albums (Billboard)	4

=== Year-end charts ===
Chart (2011)	Position
US Top Blues Albums (Billboard)	1
US Top Rock Albums (Billboard)	52
