= Just Before the Bullets Fly =

Studio album by Gregg Allman Band
- Released: July 12, 1988
- Genre: Blues
- Length: 40:11
- Label: Epic
- Producer: Rodney Mills

Gregg Allman chronology
I'm No Angel (1986)	Just Before the Bullets Fly (1988)	One More Try: An Anthology (1997)

Just Before the Bullets Fly is a studio album by the Gregg Allman Band, released on Epic Records in 1988. The album peaked at number 117 on the Billboard 200 chart.

== Production ==
The album was recorded in Miami. "Slip Away" is a cover of the song made famous by Clarence Carter. "Ocean Awash the Gunwale" was written after Gregg Allman overdosed. He mentions this in his memoir, My Cross to Bear (pages 152–153).

== Critical reception ==
Professional ratings
Review scores
Source	Rating
AllMusic	2/5 stars
(The New) Rolling Stone Album Guide	3/5 stars

The Los Angeles Times called the title track "a fine, contemporary blues with an affirmatively chunky rhythm conveying the confidence of a well-tested survivor." The Toronto Star noted that the "grooves are of the solid blues, country and Southern funk variety." The Gazette praised the "road-hardened rhythm 'n' rock."

== Track listing ==
1. "Demons" (Gregg Allman, Dan Toler, David Toler) – 3:28
2. "Before the Bullets Fly" (Warren Haynes, John Jaworowicz, Williams) – 3:41
3. "Slip Away" (William Armstrong, Marcus Daniel, Wilbur Terrell) – 4:31
4. "Thorn and a Wild Rose" (Tony Colton, Dan Toler, Bruce Waibel) – 4:14
5. "Ocean Awash the Gunwale" (Gregg Allman, Tony Colton, Dan Toler) – 4:53
6. "Can't Get Over You" (Billy Burnette, David Malloy) – 3:28
7. "Island" (Gregg Allman, Tony Colton, Johnny Neel, Dan Toler) - 4:17
8. "Fear of Falling" (Gregg Allman, Tim Heding, John Townsend) – 3:35
9. "Night Games" (Gregg Allman, Tony Colton, Dan Toler) – 3:53
10. "Every Hungry Woman" (Gregg Allman) – 4:33

== Personnel ==
- Gregg Allman – Keyboards, Hammond Organ, Lead Vocals
- Tim Heding – Keyboards, Background Vocals
- Dan Toler – Guitar, Keyboards
- Bruce Waibel – Bass Guitar, Background Vocals
- David Frankie Toler – Drums
- Chaz Trippy – Percussion

Production

- Michael Caplan – Executive Producer
- Rodney Mills – Producer, Engineer, Mixing
- Christopher Austopchuk – Art Direction
- Caroline Greyshock – Photography
- Mike Gallo – Electronics
