= Gregg Allman =

American musician (1947–2017)

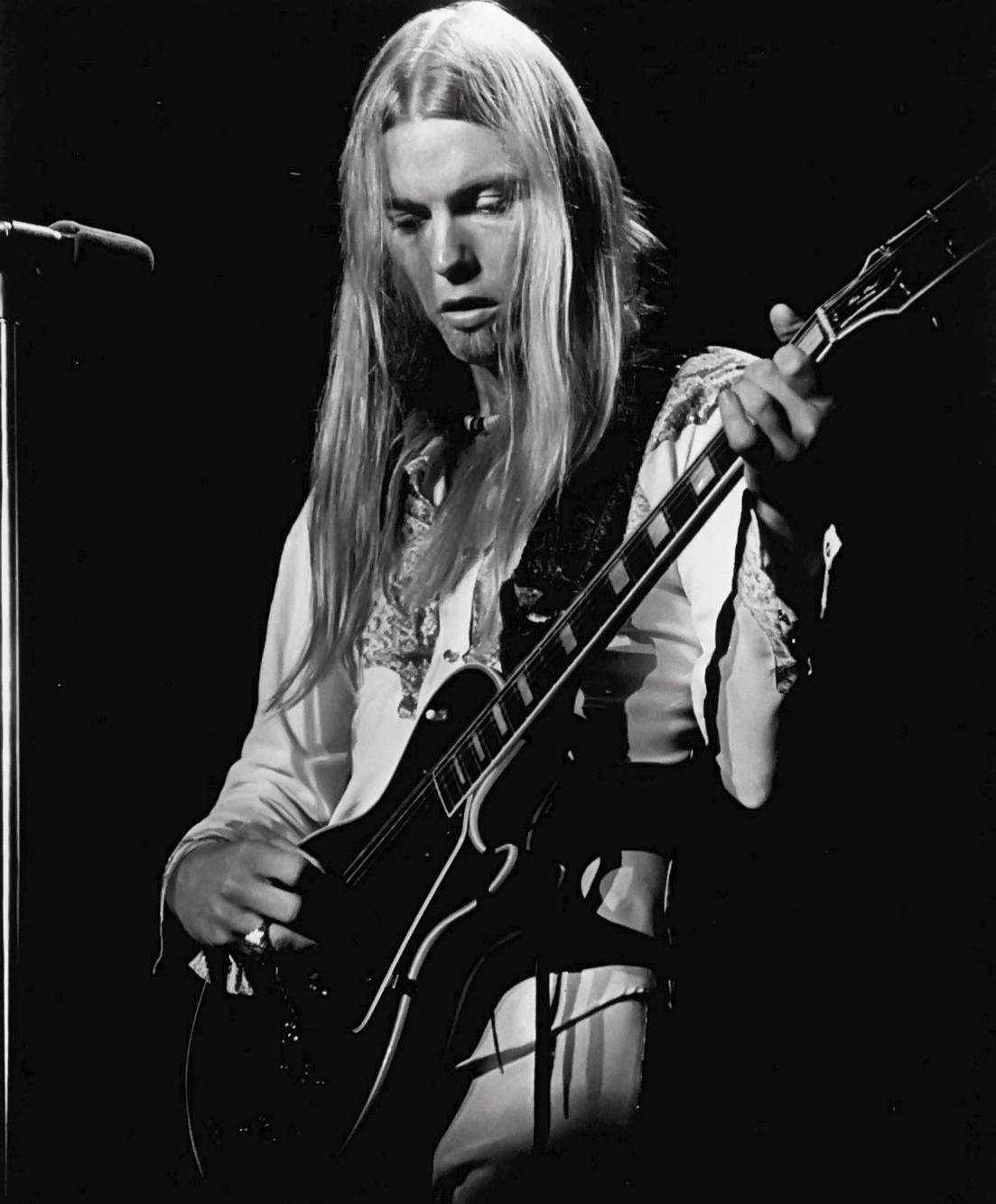
- Allman performing in 1975
- Born: Gregory LeNoir Allman; December 8, 1947; Nashville, Tennessee, U.S.
- Died: May 27, 2017 (aged 69); Richmond Hill, Georgia, U.S.
- Resting place: Rose Hill Cemetery
- Occupations: Musician; singer; songwriter
- Years active: 1960–2017
- Spouses: Shelley Kay Jefts (m. 1971; div. 1972); Janice Blair (m. 1973; div. 1974); Cher (m. 1975; div. 1979); Julie Bindas (m. 1979; div. 1981); Danielle Galiana (m. 1989; div. 1994); Stacey Fountain (m. 2001; div. 2008); Shannon Williams (m. 2017)
- Children: 5, including Michael, Devon and Elijah Blue
- Musical career
- Genres: Blues; rock; southern rock; gospel; country
- Instruments: Vocals; keyboards; guitar
- Labels: Liberty; Capricorn; Warner Bros.; Epic; Rounder
- Formerly of: Hour Glass; The Allman Joys; The Allman Brothers Band; Allman and Woman; Gregg Allman Band
- Website: greggallman.com

Gregory LeNoir Allman (December 8, 1947 – May 27, 2017) was an American musician, singer and songwriter. He was known for being a founding member, lead singer, and keyboardist for the Allman Brothers Band. Allman grew up with an interest in rhythm and blues music, and the Allman Brothers Band fused it with rock music, jazz, and country. He wrote several of the band's most popular songs, including "Whipping Post", "Melissa", and "Midnight Rider". Allman also had a successful solo career, releasing eight studio albums.

He was born and spent much of his childhood in Nashville, Tennessee, before relocating to Daytona Beach, Florida, and then Macon, Georgia.

He and his brother Duane Allman formed the Allman Brothers Band in 1969, which reached mainstream success with their 1971 live album At Fillmore East, but shortly thereafter, Duane was killed in a motorcycle crash. The band continued, and released Brothers and Sisters, which became their most successful album, in 1973. Allman began a solo career with Laid Back the same year. He gained some additional fame for his 1975 to 1979 marriage to pop star Cher. He had an unexpected mid-career hit with his cover of the song "I'm No Angel" in 1987, and his seventh solo album, Low Country Blues (2011), saw the highest chart positions of his career.

Throughout his life, Allman struggled with alcohol and substance use, which formed the basis of his memoir My Cross to Bear (2012). His final album, Southern Blood, was released posthumously on September 8, 2017.

As a musician, Allman was fundamentally an organist, performing with a Hammond B3 organ, but also was skilled in the guitar. As a lead singer, he was recognized for his soulful voice. For his work in music, Allman was referred to as a Southern rock pioneer and received numerous awards, including one Grammy Award; he was inducted into the Rock and Roll Hall of Fame and the Georgia Music Hall of Fame. His distinctive voice placed him 70th in the Rolling Stone list of the "100 Greatest Singers of All Time".

== Early life ==
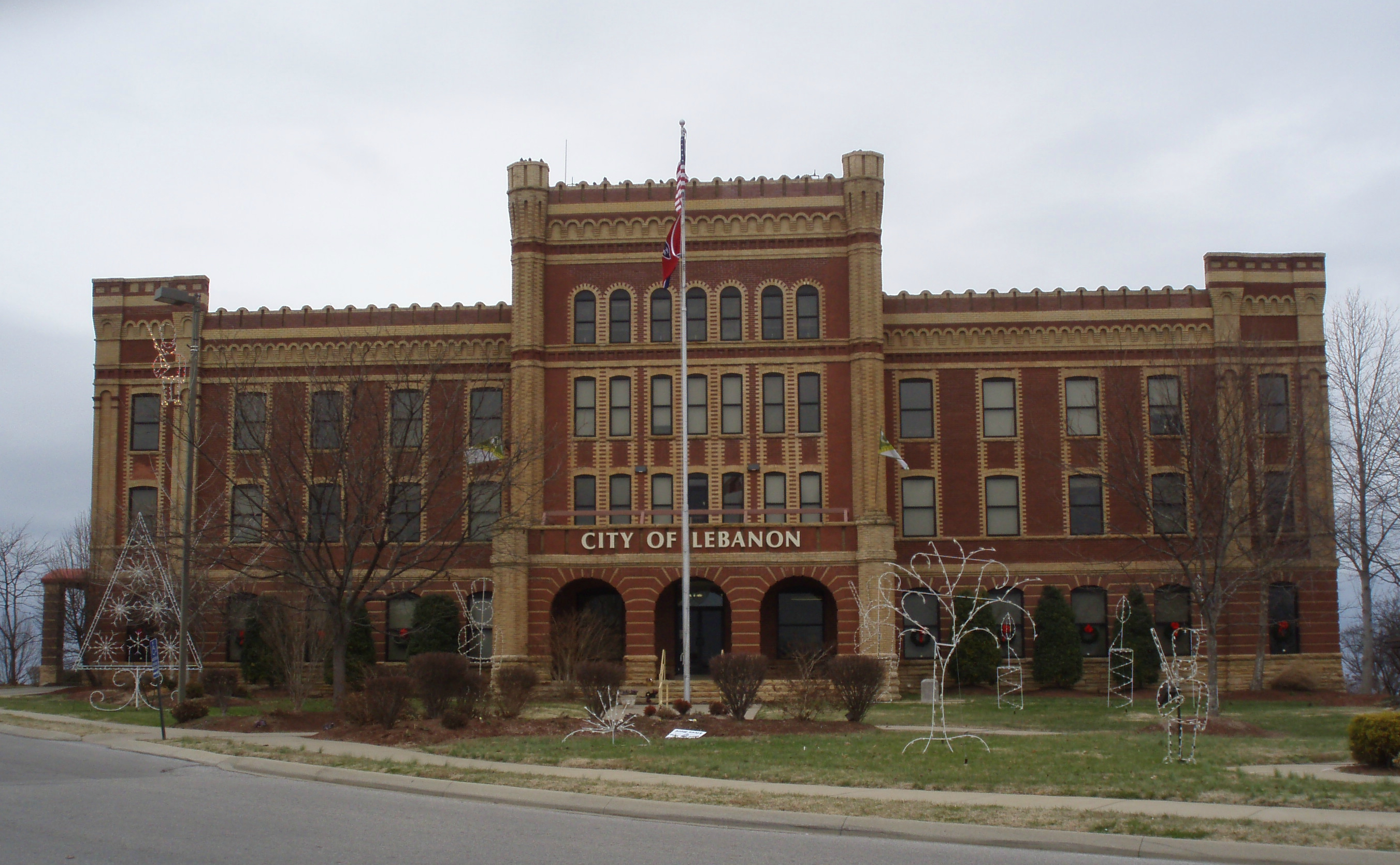
Allman and his elder brother Duane attended Castle Heights Military Academy in Lebanon, Tennessee

Allman was born on December 8, 1947, at Saint Thomas Hospital in Nashville, Tennessee, to Geraldine Robbins Allman (1917–2015) and Willis Turner Allman (1918–1949). The couple had met during World War II in Raleigh, North Carolina, when Willis was on leave from the U.S. Army, before marrying and moving to Tennessee. Their first child, Duane, was born in Nashville in November 20, 1946. In 1949, the Army relocated the family to Fort Story in Norfolk, Virginia

On December 26, 1949, Willis offered a ride to a hitchhiker, Michael Robert "Buddy" Green (1923–2024), an Army veteran, who then shot and killed Willis during an armed robbery in Norfolk. Green was captured, convicted, sentenced, and paroled in 1972. Geraldine returned to Nashville with her two sons shortly after Willis was killed and never remarried. Lacking money to support her children, she enrolled in college to become a Certified Public Accountant (CPA). State laws at the time, according to her son, required students to live on-campus, so Gregg and his brother were sent to Castle Heights Military Academy in nearby Lebanon. Young Gregg interpreted these actions as evidence of his mother's dislike for him, though he later came to understand the reality: "She was actually sacrificing everything she possibly could—she was working around the clock, getting by just by a hair, so as to not send us to an orphanage, which would have been a living hell." While his brother adopted a defiant attitude to his surroundings, Allman felt largely depressed at the school. With little to do, he studied often and developed an interest in medicine; had he not gone into music, he hoped to become a dentist. He was rarely hazed at Castle Heights as his brother protected him, but he often suffered beatings from instructors when he received poor grades. The brothers returned to Nashville upon their mother's graduation, and the family moved to Daytona Beach, Florida, in 1959.

Allman would later recall two events that led to his interest in music. In 1960, the two brothers attended a concert in Nashville with Jackie Wilson headlining alongside Otis Redding, B.B. King, and Patti LaBelle. Allman was also exposed to music through Jimmy Banes, an intellectually disabled neighbor of his grandmother in Nashville, who introduced him to the guitar.

Gregg worked as a paper boy to afford a Silvertone guitar, which he purchased from Sears when he saved up enough funds. Like his brother, he was left-handed but played the guitar right-handed. He and Duane often fought to play the instrument, although there was "no question that music brought" the two together. In Daytona, they joined a YMCA group called the Y Teens, their first experience performing music with others. He and Duane returned to Castle Heights in their teen years, where they formed a band called The Misfits. Despite this, he still felt "lonesome and out of place", and quit the academy. He returned to Daytona Beach and pursued music further, and the duo formed another band, The Shufflers, in 1963. He attended high school at Seabreeze High School, where he graduated in 1965. However, he grew undisciplined in his studies as his interests diverged: "Between the women and the music, school wasn't a priority anymore."

== Musical beginnings ==
=== First bands (1960–1968) ===
We would rehearse every day in the club, go have lunch, rehearse some more, go home and take a shower, then go to the gig. Sometimes we would rehearse after we got home from the gig too, just get out the acoustics and play. The next day, we'd go have breakfast, go rehearse, and do it all over again. We rehearsed constantly.

— Allman on his musical evolution

The two Allman brothers began meeting various musicians in the Daytona Beach area. They met a man named Floyd Miles, and they began to jam with his band, the Houserockers. "I would just sit there and study Floyd ... I studied how he phrased his songs, how he got the words out, and how the other guys sang along with him", Gregg would later recall. They later formed their first "real" band, the Escorts, which performed a mix of Top 40 and R&B music at clubs around town. Duane, who took the lead vocal role on early demos, encouraged his younger brother to sing instead. He and Duane often spent all of their money on records, as they attempted to learn songs from them. The group performed constantly as music became their entire focus; Gregg missed his high school graduation because he was performing that evening. In his autobiography, Gregg recalls listening to Nashville R&B station WLAC at night and discovering artists such as Muddy Waters, who later became central to his musical evolution. He avoided being drafted into the Vietnam War by intentionally shooting himself in the foot.

The Escorts evolved into the Allman Joys, the brothers' first successful band. After a successful summer run locally, they hit the road in fall 1965 for a series of performances throughout the Southeast; their first show outside Daytona was at the Stork Club in Mobile, Alabama, where they were booked for 22 weeks straight. Afterward, they were booked at the Sahara Club in nearby Pensacola, Florida, for several weeks. Allman later regarded Pensacola as "a real turning point in my life", as it was where he learned how to capture audiences and about stage presence. He also received his first Vox keyboard there, learning how to play it during the ensuing tour. By the following summer, the band booked time at a studio in Nashville, where they recorded several songs, aided by a plethora of drugs. These recordings were later released as Early Allman in 1973, to Allman's dismay. He soon grew tired of performing covers and began writing original compositions. They settled in St. Louis, Missouri, for a time, where in the spring of 1967 they began performing alongside Johnny Sandlin and Paul Hornsby, among others, under various names. They considered disbanding, but Bill McEuen, manager of the Nitty Gritty Dirt Band, convinced the band to relocate to Los Angeles, giving them the funds to do so.

"Melissa"
"Melissa" was the first original song Allman completed, and followed over 200 attempts.

He arranged a recording contract with Liberty Records in June 1967, and the band began to record an album under the new name the Hour Glass, suggested by their producer, Dallas Smith. Recording was a difficult experience: "The music had no life to it—it was poppy, preprogrammed shit", Allman said. Though they considered themselves sellouts, they needed money to live. At concerts, they declined to play anything off their debut album, released that October, instead opting to play the blues. Such gigs were sparse, however, as Liberty only allowed one performance per month. After some personnel changes, they recorded their second album, Power of Love, released in March 1968. It contained more original songs by Allman, though they still felt constricted by its process. The band broke up when Duane explicitly told off executives at Liberty. They threatened to freeze the band, so they would be unable to record for any other label for seven years. Allman stayed behind to appease the label, giving them the rights to a solo album. The rest of the band mocked Allman, viewing him as too scared to leave and return to the South. Meanwhile, Duane began doing session work at FAME Studios in Muscle Shoals, Alabama, where he began putting together a new band. He phoned his brother with the proposition of joining the new band—which would have two guitarists and two drummers. With his deal at Liberty fulfilled, Gregg drove to Jacksonville, Florida, in March 1969 to jam with the new band. He called the birth of the group "one of the finer days in my life ... I was starting to feel like I belonged to something again."

== The Allman Brothers Band and mainstream success ==
=== Formation, touring, and Duane's death (1969–1971) ===
The Allman Brothers Band moved to Macon, Georgia, and forged a strong brotherhood, spending countless hours rehearsing, consuming psychedelic drugs, and hanging out in Rose Hill Cemetery. In addition to Gregg, the band included Duane, Dickey Betts on guitar, Berry Oakley on bass, and Jaimoe and Butch Trucks on drums. The group remade blues numbers like "Trouble No More" and "One Way Out", in addition to improvising jams. Gregg, who had struggled to write in the past, became the band's main songwriter, composing songs such as "Whipping Post" and "Midnight Rider". The group's self-titled debut album was released in November 1969 through Atco and Capricorn Records, but suffered from poor sales. The band played continuously in 1970, performing over 300 dates on the road, which contributed to a larger following. Their second record, Idlewild South, was issued in September 1970, and also received a muted commercial response.

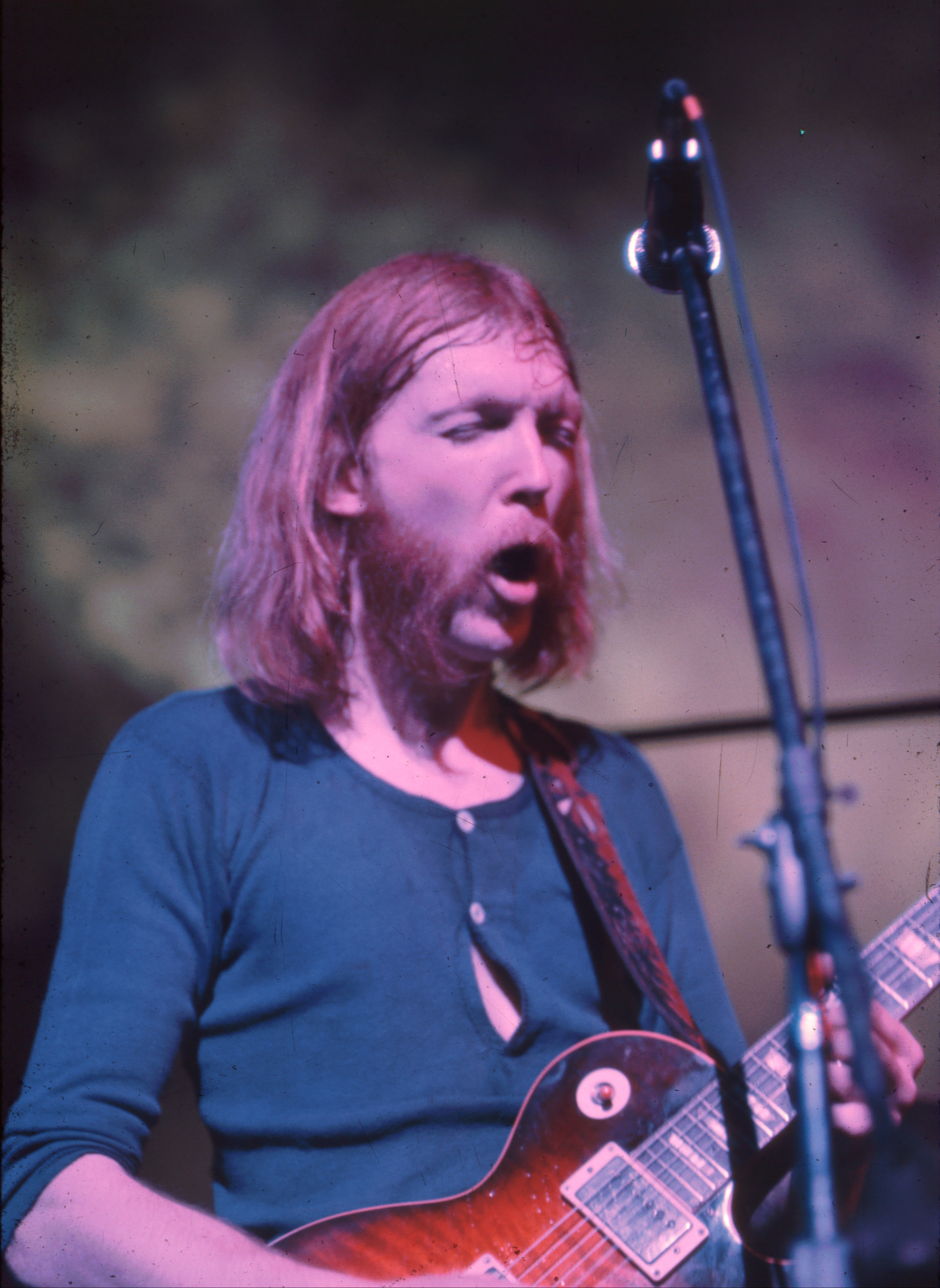
Allman's elder brother Duane, who was killed in a motorcycle crash in 1971

Their fortunes began to change over the course of 1971, where the band's average earnings doubled. "We realized that the audience was a big part of what we did, which couldn't be duplicated in a studio. A lightbulb finally went off; we needed to make a live album", said Gregg. At Fillmore East, recorded at the Fillmore East in New York City, was released in July 1971. At Fillmore East peaked at No. 13 on Billboard's Top Pop Albums chart, and was certified gold by the Recording Industry Association of America that October, becoming their commercial and artistic breakthrough. Although suddenly prosperous and successful, much of the band and its entourage struggled with addiction to numerous drugs; they all agreed to quit heroin, but cocaine remained a problem.

Duane was killed in a motorcycle accident on October 29, 1971, in Macon. At his funeral, Gregg performed "Melissa", which was his brother's favorite song. As the band took some time apart to process their loss, At Fillmore East continued to be a major success domestically.

=== Mainstream success and fame (1972–1976) ===
After Duane's death, the band held a meeting on their future; it was clear all wanted to continue, and after a short period, the band returned to the road. They completed their third studio album, Eat a Peach, that winter, which raised each member's spirits. Eat a Peach was released the following February, and it became the band's second hit album, shipping gold and peaking at No. 4 on Billboard's album chart. The band purchased 432 acres of land in Juliette, Georgia, which became a group hangout. Berry Oakley, however, was visibly suffering from Allman's death. In November 1972, he too was killed in a motorcycle crash.

"Queen of Hearts"
"Queen of Hearts" led Allman to record his first solo album, Laid Back (1973).

The band unanimously decided to carry on, and enlisted Lamar Williams on bass and Chuck Leavell on piano. The band began recording Brothers and Sisters, their follow-up album, and Betts became the group's de facto leader during the recording process. Meanwhile, after some internal disagreements, Allman began recording a solo album, which he titled Laid Back. The sessions for both albums often overlapped and its creation caused tension within the rest of the band. Both albums were released in late 1973, with Brothers and Sisters cementing the Allman Brothers' place among the biggest rock bands of the 1970s. "Ramblin' Man", Betts' country-infused number, rose to No. 2 on the Billboard Hot 100 and gave the band their biggest hit. The group returned to touring, playing arenas and stadiums almost exclusively. Privately, the group was dealing with miscommunication and spiraling drug problems. In 1974, the band was regularly making $100,000 per show, and was renting the Starship, a customized Boeing 720B used by Led Zeppelin and the Rolling Stones.

Band member relationships became increasingly frustrated, amplified by heavy drug and alcohol abuse. In January 1975, Allman began a relationship with pop star Cher—which made him more "famous for being famous than for his music", according to biographer Alan Paul. The sessions that produced 1975's Win, Lose or Draw, the last album by the original Allman Brothers Band, were disjointed and inconsistent. Upon its release, it was considered subpar and had disappointing sales; the band later remarked that they were "embarrassed" by the album. Though their relationships were fraying, the Allman Brothers Band went on tour for some of the biggest crowds of their career. Allman later pointed to a benefit for presidential candidate Jimmy Carter as the only real "high point" in an otherwise "rough, rough tour". The "breaking point" came when Allman, granted immunity from prosecution, testified in the trial of band security man Scooter Herring, who was arrested and convicted on five counts of conspiracy to distribute cocaine. Bandmates considered Allman a "snitch", and he received death threats, leading to law enforcement protection. Herring received a 75-year prison sentence, but he only served eighteen months. The band refused to communicate with Allman after the ordeal and finally broke up. Leavell, Williams, and Jaimoe continued playing together in Sea Level, Betts formed Great Southern, and Allman founded the Gregg Allman Band.

== Mid-career and struggles ==
=== Marriages, breakups, and music (1975–1981) ===
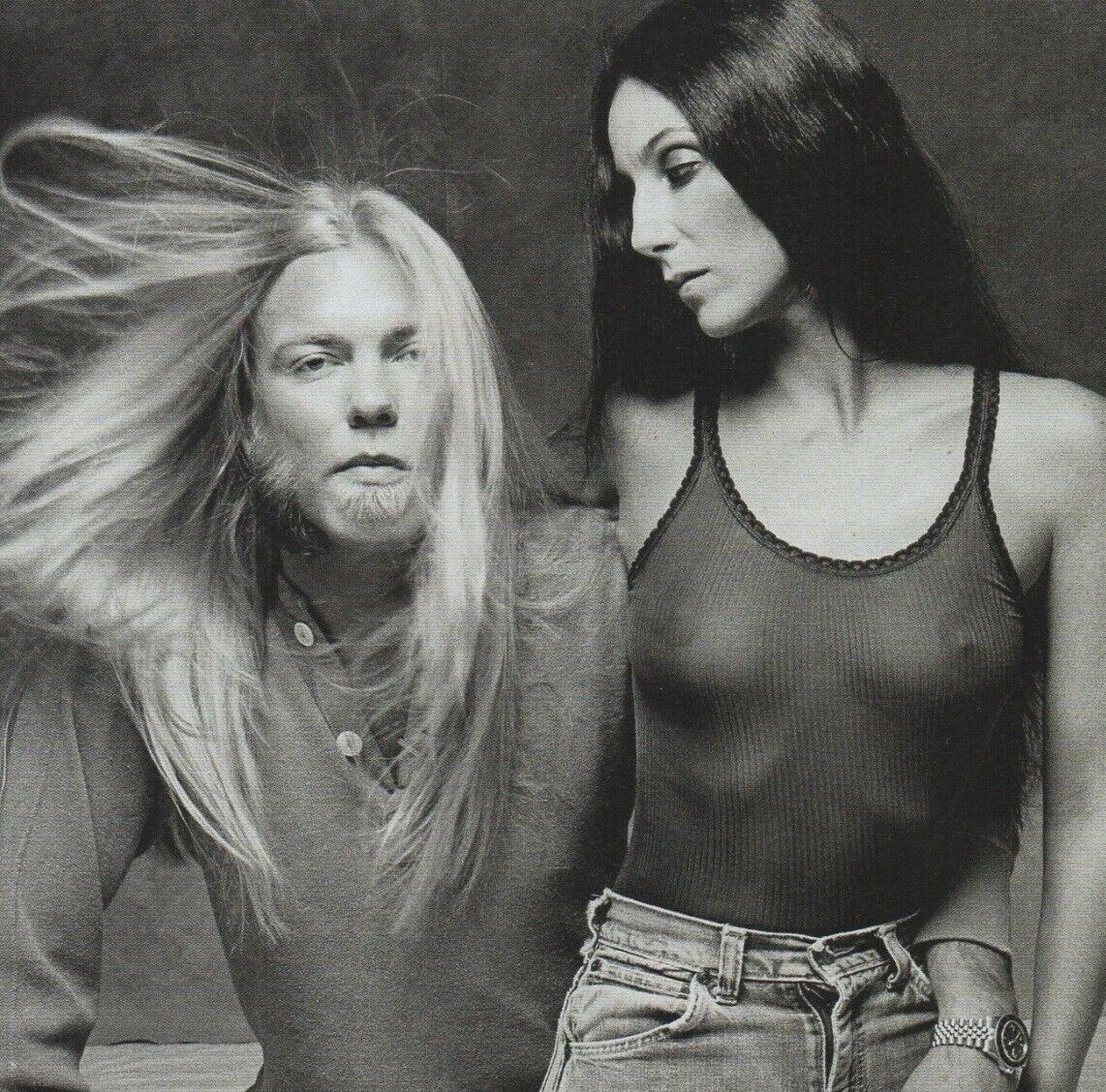
Allman with then-wife Cher in 1976

Allman married Cher in June 1975, and the two lived in Hollywood during their years together as tabloid favorites. Their marriage produced one son, Elijah Blue Allman, who was born in July 1976. Allman recorded his second solo album, Playin' Up a Storm, with the Gregg Allman Band, and it was released in May 1977. He also worked on a collaborative album with Cher titled Two the Hard Way, which, upon its release, was a massive failure. The couple went to Europe to tour in support of both albums, though the crowd reception was mixed. With a combination of Allman Brothers fans and Cher fans, fights often broke out at venues, which led Cher to cancel the tour. Turmoil began to overwhelm their relationship, and the two divorced in 1979. Allman returned to Daytona Beach to stay with his mother, spending the majority of his time partying, chasing women, and touring with the Nighthawks, a blues band.

The Allman Brothers Band reunited in 1978. Allman said that each member had his own reasons for rejoining, though he surmised it was a combination of displeasure with how things ended, missing each other, and a need for money. The band's reunion album, Enlightened Rogues, was released in February 1979 and was a mild commercial success. Betts's lawyer, Steve Massarsky, began managing the group, and he led the band to sign with Arista, who pushed the band to "modernize" their sound. Drugs remained a problem with the band, particularly for Betts and Allman. The band again grew apart, replacing Jaimoe with new guitarist, Dan Toler's brother Frankie. The band considered their post-reunion albums—Reach for the Sky (1980) and Brothers of the Road (1981)—"embarrassing", and subsequently broke up in 1982.

=== Downtime, a surprise hit, and another reformation (1982–1990) ===
Allman spent much of the 1980s adrift and living in Sarasota, Florida, with friends. David "Rook" Goldflies, Allman's bass player, managed to bring him to Kenny Veenstra's Progressive Music Studios in Tampa. There Allman recorded vocals on a number of Goldflies' songs. Though Allman had never heard the cuts, he sang them perfectly... one line at a time... (the producer promising beer and pizza after he finished the vocals). His alcohol abuse was at one of its worst points, with Allman consuming "a minimum of a fifth of vodka a day." He felt that the local police pursued him heavily; during this time, he was arrested and charged with a DUI. While he did not consider himself "washed up", Allman noted in his autobiography that he kept a "fear of everybody forgetting about you." Southern rock had faded from view, and electronic music formed much of the pop music of the decade. "There was hardly anybody playing live music, and those who did were doing it for not much money, in front of some die-hard old hippies in real small clubs", he later recalled. Nevertheless, he reformed the Gregg Allman Band and toured nationwide.

By 1986, having grown tired of financial instability, Allman approached Betts for a co-headlining tour, a sort-of Allman Brothers reunion. After recording several demos, Allman was offered a recording contract by Epic Records. His third solo release, I'm No Angel (1987), sold well; its title track became a surprise hit on radio. Allman released another solo album the following year, Just Before the Bullets Fly, though it did not sell as well as its predecessor. In the late 1980s, he moved to Los Angeles. He married Danielle Galiana in what he dubbed a midlife crisis. The marriage began with Allman overdosing—"so [it] started off with a bang", he said. He dabbled in acting starting in 1989, taking several small parts. His largest (and final) role was criminal Will Gaines in the 1991 crime drama Rush.

The Allman Brothers Band celebrated its 20th anniversary in 1989, and the band reunited once more for a summer tour, with Jaimoe again on drums. The band featured guitarist Warren Haynes and pianist Johnny Neel, both from the Dickey Betts Band, and bassist Allen Woody. The band returned to the studio with longtime producer Tom Dowd for 1990's Seven Turns, which was considered a return to form. "Good Clean Fun" and "Seven Turns" each became big hits on the Mainstream Rock Tracks chart. The addition of Haynes and Woody had "reenergized" the ensemble.

=== Reforming the band and breaking addictions (1991–2000) ===
The newly reformed Allman Brothers began touring heavily, which helped build a new fan base: Neel left the group and the band added percussionist Marc Quiñones, formerly of Spyro Gyra, the following year. They recorded two more studio albums—Shades of Two Worlds (1992) and Where It All Begins. In 1993 his youngest daughter Layla Brooklyn Allman was born while Gregg was living in Novato, California. When his relationship with Shelby Blackburn ended, Layla and Shelby moved back to Los Angeles. Allman's older daughter, Island, came to live with him in Novato, and despite early struggles, they eventually grew very close.

The band was inducted into the Rock and Roll Hall of Fame in January 1995; Allman was severely inebriated and could barely make it through his acceptance speech. Seeing the ceremony broadcast on television later, Allman was mortified, providing a catalyst for his final, successful attempt to quit alcohol and substance abuse. He hired two in-home nurses who switched twelve-hour shifts to help him through the process.

For much of the 1990s, Allman lived in Marin County, California, spending his free time with close friends and riding his motorcycle. He recorded a fifth solo album, Searching for Simplicity, which was quietly released on 550 Music in 1997. Despite positive developments in his personal life, relationships began declining in the band yet again. Haynes and Woody left to focus on Gov't Mule, feeling as though a break was imminent. The group recruited Oteil Burbridge of the Aquarium Rescue Unit to replace Woody on bass, and added Jack Pearson on guitar. Concerns arose over the increasing loudness of Allman Brothers shows, which were largely centered on Betts. "It had ceased to be a band—everything had to be based around what Dickey was playing", said Allman. Pearson, struggling with tinnitus, left as a result. Butch Trucks phoned his nephew, Derek Trucks, asking him to join the band for a 30th anniversary tour. Anger boiled over within the group toward Betts, which led to all original members sending him a letter, informing him of their intentions to tour without him. All involved contended that the break was temporary, but Betts responded by hiring a lawyer and suing the group, which led to a permanent divorce. That August, Woody was found dead in a hotel room in New York, which hit Allman particularly hard. In 2001, Haynes rejoined the band, setting the stage for more than a decade of stability within the group.

== Later life ==
=== Touring and health problems (2000–2011) ===
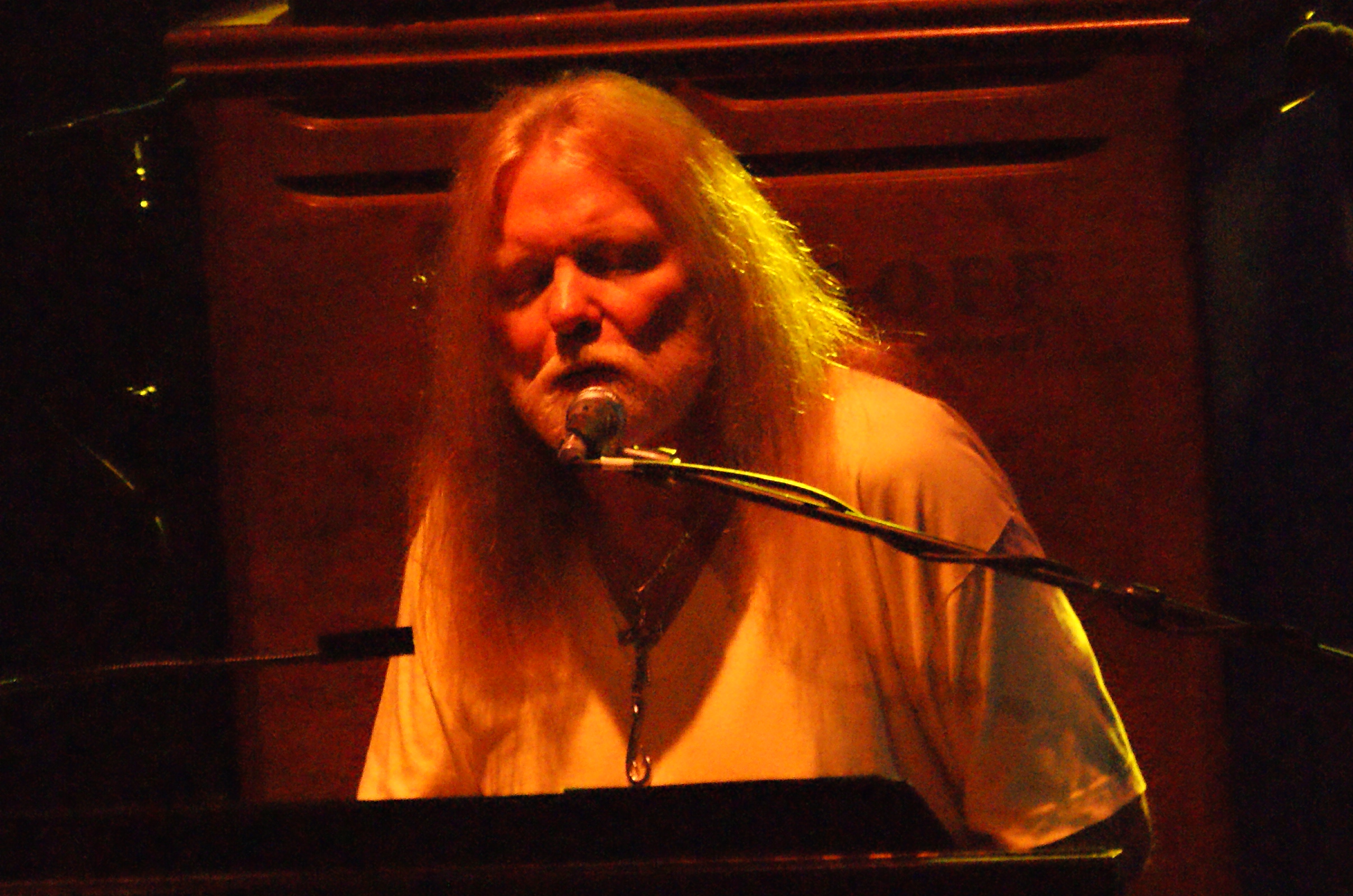
Allman during the Allman Brothers Band's annual residency at the Beacon Theatre in New York in 2009

Allman moved to Richmond Hill, Georgia, in 2000, purchasing five acres on the Belfast River. The last incarnation of the Allman Brothers Band was well-regarded among fans and the general public, and the group remained stable and productive. The band released its final studio album, Hittin' the Note (2003), to critical acclaim. Allman co-wrote many songs with Haynes and regarded it as his favorite album by the group since their earliest days. The band continued to tour throughout the 2000s, remaining a top touring act, regularly attracting more than 20,000 fans. The decade closed with a successful 40th anniversary celebration at the Beacon Theatre, where the band would hold residencies most years during their reunion. In 2014, the Allman Brothers Band performed their final concerts, as Haynes and Derek Trucks desired to depart the group.

Allman struggled with health problems during the last years of his life. He was diagnosed with hepatitis C in 2007, which he attributed to a dirty tattoo needle. By the next year, three tumors were discovered in his liver. He went on a waiting list and, after five months, underwent a successful liver transplant in 2010.

In 2011, Allman went public about his battle with hepatitis C. He headlined Merck and the American Liver Foundation's "Tune In to Hep C Campaign" to raise awareness and urge Baby Boomers to get tested and treated. As part of Tune In to Hep C, The Allman Brothers Band headlined a hepatitis C fundraiser and awareness concert at the Beacon Theatre in New York. The concert raised $250,000 to benefit the National Viral Hepatitis Roundtable and the American Liver Foundation for education and awareness efforts. The National Viral Hepatitis Roundtable in October 2017 created the Gregg Allman Hepatitis C Leadership Award – an annual award to posthumously honor Allman and others who work on behalf of people living with hepatitis C. Michael Lehman, Allman's longtime manager, accepted the award on his behalf.

Allman's seventh album, Low Country Blues, was produced by T-Bone Burnett. Upon its release in January 2011, it represented Allman's highest-ever chart peak in the U.S., debuting at No. 5. He promoted the album heavily in Europe, until he canceled the rest of the trip due to an upper respiratory infection. This led to lung surgery later in 2011, and rehab in 2012 for addiction following his treatments. That year, Allman released his memoir, My Cross to Bear. In 2014, a tribute concert was held celebrating his career; it was later released as All My Friends: Celebrating the Songs & Voice of Gregg Allman.

=== Final years and death (2012–2017) ===
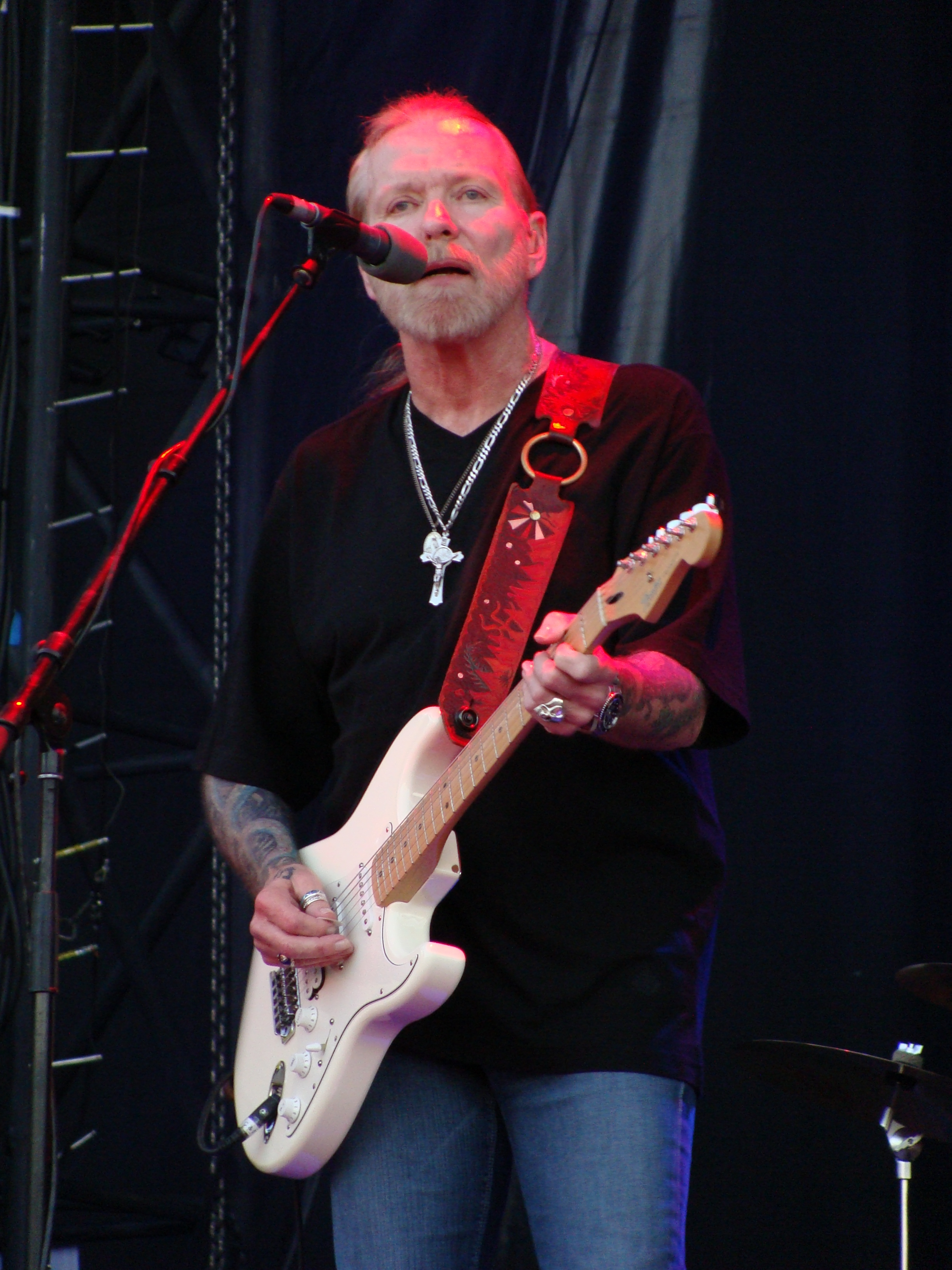
Allman performing in 2011

After the dissolution of the Allman Brothers, Allman kept busy performing music with his solo band, releasing the live album Gregg Allman Live: Back to Macon, GA in 2015. In 2016, he received an honorary doctorate from Mercer University in Macon, presented by former President Jimmy Carter. However, his health problems remained; he had atrial fibrillation, and although it did not become public knowledge, his liver cancer had returned. "He kept it very private because he wanted to continue to play music until he couldn't", his manager Michael Lehman said. He attempted to keep a light schedule at the advice of doctors, who warned that too many performances might amplify his conditions. His last concert took place in Atlanta at his own Laid Back Festival along with ZZ Top at Lakewood Amphitheatre on October 29, 2016. In succeeding months, he cancelled his remaining concerts, citing "serious health issues". He denied reports that he had entered hospice care, but was resting at home on doctor's orders.

Allman died in his sleep in his Richmond Hill home on May 27, 2017, due to complications from liver cancer at the age of 69. His funeral took place at Snow's Memorial Chapel in Macon on June 3, and was attended by family and associates, including Dickey Betts, Derek Trucks, Cher, and former President Carter, among others. According to Rolling Stone, the mourners dressed casually in jeans per Allman's request, and "hundreds of fans, many wearing Allman Brothers shirts and listening to the band's music, lined the route along the funeral procession." Allman was buried at Rose Hill Cemetery in Macon beside his brother Duane and fellow band member Berry Oakley.

Before his death, Allman recorded his last album, Southern Blood, with producer Don Was at FAME Studios in Muscle Shoals, Alabama. The album was recorded with his then-current backing band. The album was released on September 8, 2017, and it received critical acclaim.

In My Cross to Bear, Allman reflected on his life and career:

Music is my life's blood. I love music, I love to play good music, and I love to play music for people who appreciate it. And when it's all said and done, I'll go to my grave and my brother will greet me, saying, "Nice work, little brother—you did alright." I must have said this a million times, but if I died today, I have had me a blast.

A documentary film about Allman's life, Gregg Allman: The Music of My Soul, was released in 2026.

== Musical style and songwriting ==
"Midnight Rider"
Allman's solo rendition of "Midnight Rider" (1973). He considered it his signature song.

Allman's style was rooted in rhythm and blues music. He characterized his work with the Allman Brothers Band as "playing some blues with some jazz mixed in." He was introduced to blues music through musician and childhood friend Floyd Miles, who later toured with Allman as a part of his solo band. He also gave him advice on how to sing from his stomach, as opposed to his chest. Allman was inspired by "Little Milton" Campbell, who "inspired me all my life to get my voice crisper, get my diaphragm harder, use less air, and just spit it out. He taught me to be absolutely sure of every note you hit, and to hit it solid." After his death, many outlets credited Allman as among the greatest white blues vocalists of his time. Many close to Allman disputed this, with son Devon Allman commenting, "My dad didn't see color. ... I know people mean well when they say the best white blues singer, but I say take white off of there, because he was just one of the best ever. He just channeled so much feeling." Jaimoe called the label "straight bullshit. He's a great blues singer. A great singer, period." An editorial published in The Roanoke Times questioned that while Allman could rightfully be considered a cultural appropriator: "Is that not the nature of music, or art in general, that it borrows from different cultures to create something new?" Likewise, a Newsweek tribute to Allman noted that "Ray Charles took grief for making a country and western album, too."

As a songwriter, Allman wrote several famous songs, including "Whipping Post", "Melissa", and "Midnight Rider", which he dubbed the "song I'm most proud of in my career." He could be a very slow songwriter, writing only when inspiration struck. If the song was forced, he felt it could end up contrived. In My Cross to Bear, his 2012 memoir, he laid out his approach to songwriting: the first verse introduces a story, it is expounded upon in the second, and the third may serve as an epilogue. Allman credited singer-songwriter John D. Loudermilk, whom he first met while touring with the Allman Joys, as an influence on his writing. "[He] taught me to let the song come to me, not to force it, not to put down a word just because it might rhyme or fit. He taught me to let the feeling come from your heart and go to your head." Allman received the Songwriter Award from the Georgia Music Hall of Fame in the last year of his life.

On October 28, 2021, Sony Music Publishing announced it had signed a global agreement with Gregg Allman's estate to administer its catalog of songs. The deal covered many of Allman's compositions from his time as a member of the Allman Brothers Band, as well as songs written throughout his solo career.

== Personal life ==
Allman was married seven times:

- He married Shelley Kay Jefts in 1971; they divorced the following year. They had a son, Devon.
- He married Janice Blair in 1973; they divorced in 1974. She is pictured on the sleeve of Laid Back.
- His most well-known relationship was with Cher, whom he married in 1975. They had a son, Elijah Blue, and divorced in 1979.
- He wed Julie Bindas in 1979; they had a daughter, Delilah Island, and divorced in 1981.
- He married Danielle Galiana in 1989; they divorced in 1994.
- His longest marriage was to Stacey Fountain, from 2001 to 2008—"seven out-of-sight years," he remarked.
- In 2012, he announced his engagement to Shannon Williams, who was 40 years his junior. They were married in February 2017.

In My Cross to Bear, he wrote that "Every woman I've ever had a relationship with has loved me for who they thought I was." At the time of its writing, he noted that he only spoke to two out of his then-six ex-wives, including Cher. Although he said would not want to be married to Cher again, they eventually became close friends.

Allman had five children, three with various wives and two with other women he had relationships with:

- son Michael Allman (born 1966), lead singer of the Michael Allman Band, from his relationship with Mary Lynn Sutton;
- son Devon Allman (born 1972), lead singer of Honeytribe and The Allman Betts Band, from his marriage to Shelley Kay Jefts;
- son Elijah Blue Allman (born 1976), lead singer of Deadsy, from his marriage to Cher;
- daughter Delilah Island Allman (born 1980) from his marriage to Julie Bindas; and
- daughter Layla Brooklyn Allman (born 1993), lead singer of Picture Me Broken, from a relationship with radio journalist Shelby Blackburn

Allman was averse to organized religion for many years but claimed he always believed in a God. Following his health ailments in the latter stages of his life, he came around to his own form of Christianity and began wearing a cross necklace. He credited his sixth wife Stacey Fountain with helping him increase his faith.

== Discography ==
Studio

- Laid Back (1973)
- Playin' Up a Storm (1977)
- Two the Hard Way (1977) (with Cher)
- I'm No Angel (1987)
- Just Before the Bullets Fly (1988)
- Searching for Simplicity (1997)
- Low Country Blues (2011)
- Southern Blood (2017)

Live

- The Gregg Allman Tour (1974)
- Gregg Allman Live: Back to Macon, GA (2015)
- Uncle Sam's (2024)
- One Night in DC: May 15, 1984 (2025)
- Great As Ever: Live in Philadelphia '86 (2026)

== Filmography ==
=== Film ===
Year	Title	Role	Notes	Ref.
1989	Rush Week	Cosmo Kincald		
1991	Rush	Will Gaines		
2026	Gregg Allman: The Music of My Soul	Himself		

=== Television ===
Year	Title	Role	Notes	Ref.
1975	Cher	Himself		
1990	Superboy	Samuels	Episode: "Carnival"	
1992	Tales from the Crypt	Toland	Episode: "On a Deadman's Chest"	
2000	Family Guy	Himself	Episode: "Let's Go to the Hop"	

== See also ==
- List of Hammond organ players
- Midnight Rider (film)
