= 20th Century Masters – The Millennium Collection: The Best of the Allman Brothers Band =

Compilation album by The Allman Brothers Band
- Released: January 25, 2000
- Genre: Rock
- Length: 53:45
- Label: Polydor/UME

The Allman Brothers Band chronology
Madness of the West (1998)	20th Century Masters – The Millennium Collection: The Best of the Allman Brothers Band (2000)	Still Rockin' (2000)

20th Century Masters – The Millennium Collection: The Best of the Allman Brothers Band is a compilation album by the American rock group the Allman Brothers Band.

== Reception ==
Professional ratings
Review scores
Source	Rating
AllMusic	3/5 stars
The Encyclopedia of Popular Music	4/5 stars
The Rolling Stone Album Guide	3/5 stars
Tom Hull	B+
The Vinyl District	A−

William Ruhlmann of AllMusic stated that people likely didn't know why UMG found it necessary to release the album seeing as the A Decade of Hits 1969–1979 album already had been released, going on to state that "the new 11-track album shares nine selections with the earlier 16-track one." Michael H. Little of The Vinyl District stated the album dug into the band's "fine collection of shorter and less bluesy originals, which showed more country and boogie influences, as exemplified by the exquisitely beautiful tunes on 1973's Brothers and Sisters."

== Track listing ==
1. "Whipping Post" – 5:22
2. "Dreams" – 7:18
3. "Revival (Love Is Everywhere)" – 4:06
4. "Midnight Rider" – 3:00
5. "Hot 'Lanta" – 5:22
6. "Melissa" – 3:57
7. "Stand Back" – 3:27
8. "Blue Sky" – 5:11
9. "Ramblin' Man" – 4:49
10. "Jessica" – 7:30
11. "Crazy Love" – 3:43

== Personnel ==
Credits adapted from the album notes of the album.

The Allman Brothers Band

- Gregg Allman – organ, piano, vocals
- Duane Allman – lead guitar, acoustic guitar, slide guitar (1–5, 7, 8)
- Dickey Betts – lead guitar, acoustic guitar, slide guitar, vocals
- Berry Oakley – bass guitar (1–9)
- Butch Trucks – drums, percussion
- Jaimoe – drums, percussion

Additional musicians

- Chuck Leavell – piano (9, 10)
- Les Dudek – lead guitar (9), acoustic guitar (10)
- Lamar Williams – bass guitar (10)
- Dan Toler – guitar (11)
- David Goldflies – bass guitar (11)
- Bonnie Bramlett – backing vocals (11)

== Certifications and sales ==
Certifications for 20th Century Masters – The Millennium Collection: The Best of the Allman Brothers Band
Region	Certification	Certified units/sales
United States (RIAA)	Gold	500,000^{^}
^{^} Shipments figures based on certification alone.
