= Brothers of the Road (concert video) =

Concert video by the Allman Brothers Band

- DVD cover

Video by The Allman Brothers Band
- Released: 1982
- Recorded: 1980–1981
- Venue: University of Florida Bandshell, Capitol Theatre
- Genre: Southern rock, blues rock
- Length: 113 minutes
- Producer: Amy Polan, Len Dell'Amico

The Allman Brothers Band chronology
Brothers of the Road (1981)	Brothers of the Road (1982)	Dreams (1989)

Brothers of the Road is a concert video by the rock group the Allman Brothers Band. It includes songs from two concerts, one at the University of Florida Bandshell in Gainesville, Florida, and one at the Capitol Theatre in Passaic, New Jersey. It also includes several songs from a hotel room jam session, and several songs from an "unplugged" studio session. It was released as a VHS videotape in 1982, and as a DVD in 1998.

Brothers of the Road features the 1980 to 1982 lineup of the Allman Brothers Band – Gregg Allman on keyboards and vocals, Dickey Betts on guitar and vocals, Dan Toler on guitar, David Goldflies on bass, Mike Lawler on keyboards, and Butch Trucks and Frankie Toler on drums. In 1981 this lineup released a studio album that is also called Brothers of the Road, but the concert video includes live performances of only two songs from the album – "The Judgment" and "Never Knew How Much (I Needed You)".

== Track listing ==
University of Florida Bandshell, Gainesville, Florida, October 26, 1980:

1. Intro / "Pony Boy" (Dickey Betts)
2. "Jessica" (Betts)
3. "You Don't Love Me" (Willie Cobbs)
4. "Blue Sky" (Betts)
5. "Never Knew How Much (I Needed You)" (Gregg Allman)
6. "Statesboro Blues" (Will McTell)
7. "Whipping Post" (Allman)

Hotel room jam:

8. "Let Me Ride" (Betts)
9. "Danny Blue"
10. "The Preacher" (Horace Silver)

Studio jam:

11. "Melissa" (Allman)
12. "Come and Go Blues" (Allman)

Capitol Theatre, Passaic, New Jersey, December 16, 1981:

13. Intro / "Can't Take It with You" (Betts, Don Johnson)
14. "Crazy Love" (Betts)
15. "In Memory of Elizabeth Reed" (Betts)
16. "One Way Out" (Elmore James, Marshall Sehorn)
17. "Southbound" (Betts)
18. "The Judgment" (Betts)
19. "Ramblin' Man" (Betts)

== Personnel ==
The Allman Brothers Band

- Gregg Allman – keyboards, vocals, occasional guitar
- Dickey Betts – guitar, vocals
- Butch Trucks – drums
- David "Rook" Goldflies – bass
- "Dangerous" Dan Toler – guitar
- David "Frankie" Toler – drums
- Mike Lawler – keyboards

Additional musicians

- Keith England – backing vocals
- Bonnie Gallie – backing vocals

Production

- Director: Len Dell'Amico
- Producers: Amy Polan, Len Dell'Amico
- Executive producer: John Scher
- Editor: Veronica Loza
- Sound mix: Stephan Galfas, Butch Trucks
- Photos: Kirk West
