= Pegasus (instrumental) =

"Pegasus" is the third song from The Allman Brothers Band's 1979 album Enlightened Rogues. It is an instrumental written by lead guitarist Dickey Betts.

The song draws some comparisons to "Jessica" in some respects. It begins with an opening motif that builds into a main theme (similar to "Jessica") played in three-part harmony by Betts and Dan Toler on guitar, and Gregg Allman on Hammond B3 Organ. The main theme then leads into the first guitar solo by Toler, an organ solo by Allman, and a second guitar solo by Betts. The song suddenly gets quiet for a different reintroduction into the main theme, featuring muted guitar and Clavinet. During the second repetition of the main theme, it suddenly begins to slow into a breakdown that shifts key from A Major to B Major at the very end of the song.
