= Brothers of the Road =

Brothers of the Road may refer to:

- Brothers of the Road (album), by the Allman Brothers Band
  - "Brothers of the Road", a song from the album
- Brothers of the Road (concert video), also by the Allman Brothers Band, but with mostly different songs than the album
