= Anything Goes (Gregg Allman song) =

Single by Gregg Allman Band

from the album I'm No Angel
- A-side: "Can't Keep Running"
- Released: June 1987
- Genre: Southern rock; pop rock
- Length: 4:12
- Label: Epic
- Songwriter: Gregg Allman
- Producer: Rodney Mills

The Gregg Allman Band singles chronology
| "I'm No Angel" (1987) | "Anything Goes" (1987) | "Evidence of Love" (1987) |

"Anything Goes" is a song by the American rock band the Gregg Allman Band. It was the third single from their studio album I'm No Angel (1987), released on Epic Records.

The song reached number three on Billboard's Album Rock Tracks chart.

== Charts ==
| Chart (1987) | Peak position |
|---|---|
| US Album Rock Tracks (Billboard) | 3 |
