= I'm No Angel (Bill Medley song) =

Rock song by Tony Colton and Phil Palmer

"I'm No Angel" is a rock song written by Tony Colton and Phil Palmer, and first recorded by Bill Medley of The Righteous Brothers on his 1982 solo album Right Here and Now. It gained greater fame when it was covered by American Southern rock band the Gregg Allman Band as the title track and lead single of their 1987 album I'm No Angel, released on Epic Records. The song was an unexpected hit, gaining heavy album-oriented rock airplay and reaching number one on Billboard's Album Rock Tracks chart.

== Background ==
The song uses a B-A-E progression, and the song's lyrics were inspired by a T-shirt that writer Phil Palmer saw an infant wearing which read "Daddy's No. 1 Angel". Due to a fold in the shirt, Palmer initially read it as "Daddy's No Angel".

== Gregg Allman Band cover ==
"I'm No Angel"

Single by The Gregg Allman Band

from the album I'm No Angel
- B-side: "Lead Me On"
- Released: March 1987
- Genre: Southern rock; pop rock
- Length: 3:43
- Label: Epic
- Songwriters: Tony Colton; Phil Palmer
- Producer: Rodney Mills

The Gregg Allman Band singles chronology
"Cryin' Shame" (1977)	"I'm No Angel" (1987)	"Can't Keep Running" (1987)

Gregg Allman began performing "I'm No Angel" live in the mid-1980s and cut the song as a demo in hopes of ending his post-1977 absence from recording. Michael Caplan, a rookie A&R man at Epic and an admitted "longtime, serious Allman Brothers Band fan" would recall "I found Gregg's four-song demo cassette in my boss's garbage...I listened to [it] and the first song was 'I'm No Angel' which I thought was great. So I got in touch with Willie Perkins and Alex Hodges [respectively Allman's tour manager and booking agent] and signed Gregg to Epic." The recollection of Perkins is that Hodges was contacted by veteran Epic A&R man Lennie Petze with an interest in signing Allman to Epic, Petze having given a stack of demos to independent radio consultant Bill Bennett to listen to on a flight from New York City to Los Angeles. The demos included Allman's "I'm No Angel", which Bennett had reported back to Petze he (Bennett) could successfully pitch to at least one hundred radio stations. Following Petze's call to Hodges, Perkins brought Allman to CBS Records New York City headquarters to meet Michael Caplan and Epic vice-president Frank Rand: Caplan and Rand would soon afterwards sign Allman to Epic ensuant to seeing perform at a New Jersey gig.

The track features Allman's gruff vocals in a Bruce Springsteen sound-alike way, New Orleans music-based statement of boasting yet acknowledging of fault-strewn purpose. Critics noted the song's suitability for Allman in light of his hellraiser persona.

Laden with 1980s production touches from Rodney Mills such as heavy keyboards and drums, the record helped revive Allman's image with 1980s pop and rock audiences, and may have even indirectly contributed to the Allman Brothers Band's successful reformation two years later.

In subsequent years, "I'm No Angel" was part of Allman's solo concert repertoire, and has also been played by the Allman Brothers Band, with most of the pop gloss of the original recording eliminated.

=== Personnel ===
- Gregg Allman – Hammond organ, lead vocals
- Dan Toler – guitar
- Tim Heding – keyboards
- Bruce Waibel – bass guitar
- David Frankie Toler – drums
- Chaz Trippy – percussion

=== Charts ===
Chart (1987)	Peak position
US Album Rock Tracks (Billboard)	1
US Billboard Hot 100	49

== Other covers ==
Allman's former wife Cher identified with the song, and performed it in the high-profile opening slot of her 1989–1990 Heart of Stone Tour.

== In popular culture ==
The song was the soundtrack for sketch in the Saturday Night Live episode hosted by Josh Brolin in 2008. In the skit, a pregnant woman (Amy Poehler, who was really pregnant at the time) flirts with a patron (Brolin) while the song plays. In her 2014 book Yes Please, Poehler reveals that she and the co-writer of the sketch, Emily Spivey, were "obsessed" with the song and had been trying for years to shoehorn it into a sketch.
