= Reach for the Sky (Allman Brothers Band album) =

Studio album by the Allman Brothers Band
- Released: August 1980
- Recorded: May 1980
- Studios: Pyramid Eye Recording Studio, Lookout Mountain, Georgia
- Genre: Southern rock
- Length: 35:09
- Label: Arista
- Producers: Mike Lawler; Johnny Cobb

The Allman Brothers Band chronology
Enlightened Rogues (1979)	Reach for the Sky (1980)	Brothers of the Road (1981)

Professional ratings
Review scores
Source	Rating
AllMusic	2.5/5 stars
Rolling Stone	2/5 stars

Reach for the Sky is the seventh studio album by the rock group the Allman Brothers Band, released in 1980. It was the last album to feature drummer Jai Johanny Johanson until his return on the Seven Turns album in 1990.

Reach for the Sky was the first Allman Brothers Band album to be released by a label other than Capricorn Records. It was their second album with Dan Toler on guitar and David Goldflies on bass. The band recorded the album at Pyramid Eye Studios in Lookout Mountain, Georgia, a studio that Scott McClellan founded. The back cover photograph shows the band atop Sunset Rock on Lookout Mountain's western brow in Tennessee.

== Track listing ==
=== Side one ===
1. "Hell & High Water" (Dickey Betts) – 3:37
2. "Mystery Woman" (Gregg Allman, Dan Toler) – 3:35
3. "From the Madness of the West" (Betts) – 6:37
4. "I Got a Right to Be Wrong" (Betts) – 3:44

=== Side two ===
1. "Angeline" (Betts, Johnny Cobb, Mike Lawler) – 3:43
2. "Famous Last Words" (Betts, Bonnie Bramlett) – 2:48
3. "Keep On Keepin' On" (Betts, Toler) – 4:11
4. "So Long" (Allman, Toler) – 6:54

== Personnel ==
- Gregg Allman – keyboards, lead vocals
- Dickey Betts – guitar; co-lead vocals on 1, lead vocals on 4, 6
- "Dangerous" Dan Toler – guitar
- David "Rook" Goldflies – bass guitar
- Butch Trucks – drums, percussion
- Jai Johanny Johanson – drums

== Charts ==
Chart (1980)	Peak position
Australian Albums (Kent Music Report)	92
Canada Top Albums/CDs (RPM)	74
US Billboard 200	27
