= Enlightened Rogues =

Studio album by the Allman Brothers Band
- Released: February 1979
- Recorded: December 1978–January 1979
- Studios: Criteria (Miami, Florida)
- Genres: Southern rock; country rock; blues rock
- Length: 38:10
- Label: Capricorn / PolyGram
- Producer: Tom Dowd

The Allman Brothers Band chronology
Wipe the Windows, Check the Oil, Dollar Gas (1976)	Enlightened Rogues (1979)	Reach for the Sky (1980)

Singles from Enlightened Rogues
- 1. "Crazy Love" Released: March 1979; 2. "Can't Take It with You" Released: June 1979

Enlightened Rogues is the sixth studio album by American rock band the Allman Brothers Band. Produced by Tom Dowd, the album was released in February 1979 in the United States by Capricorn Records and PolyGram Records elsewhere. The Allman Brothers Band had broken up in 1976 following internal turmoil, amplified by escalating drug use. The band members splintered into different acts — among those Great Southern, Sea Level, and the Gregg Allman Band. Guitarist Dickey Betts approached his bandmates in 1978 with the prospects of a reunion. It is the first to feature guitarist Dan Toler and bassist David Goldflies. Living together in Sarasota, Florida, they rehearsed and wrote the material for their next album in fall 1978.

They began recording Enlightened Rogues that December, and recording stretched into the new year. The sessions took place at Criteria Studios in Miami, Florida, with producer Tom Dowd, who worked on a trio of early Allman Brothers albums. The group stayed at a home overlooking Biscayne Bay, which promoted unity within the members. The recording process was smooth and pleasant, with members showing courtesy to one another in comparison to ill feelings felt earlier. The album's title comes from a quote original guitarist Duane Allman used to describe the band: "The world is made of two great schools, enlightened rogues and religious fools."

The album was a commercial success in the United States, peaking at No. 9 and earning a RIAA gold certification. "Crazy Love" was the group's second of three Top 40 hits, reaching No. 29. Despite this, Capricorn would file for bankruptcy that fall, leading the Allman Brothers to sign to Arista Records.

== Background ==
Following the critical and commercial failure of their fifth studio album, Win, Lose or Draw (1975), the Allman Brothers Band continued to tour nationwide, playing 41 shows to some of the biggest crowds of their career. The shows were considered lackluster and the members were excessive in their drug use. The "breaking point" came when Gregg Allman testified in the trial of erstwhile road manager Scooter Herring. Bandmates considered him a "snitch", and he received death threats, leading to law-enforcement protection. Herring was convicted on five counts of conspiracy to distribute cocaine and received a 75-year prison sentence, which were later overturned as he received a lesser sentence. For his part, Allman always maintained that Herring had told him to take the deal and he would take the fall for it, but nevertheless, the band refused to communicate with him. As a result, the band finally broke up in 1976; Leavell, Williams, and Jaimoe continued playing together in Sea Level, Betts formed Great Southern, and Allman founded the Gregg Allman Band.

Betts approached Allman with the prospect of a reunion in 1978. Allman, who was addicted to Dilaudid and vodka, met with his former bandmates after completing a detox program. He, Betts, Trucks, and Jaimoe all agreed to reform. "No one was pleased with how things had ended back in ’76, and the combination of the passing of time, missing each other musically, and money all made it easier for us to put the past behind us," Allman later wrote. Together, the rest of the band joined Great Southern for five songs during an August concert in New York's Central Park. Williams and Leavell were invited for the reunion, but were busy with Sea Level (Jaimoe had left the band several months prior). As a result, the Allman Brothers added two new members from Great Southern: guitarist "Dangerous" Dan Toler and bassist David "Rook" Goldflies. Jaimoe summarized the performance: "We were a little rusty—maybe a lot rusty—and we were playing with some different guys, but it felt good to be together." Following this, the band made an appearance at the annual Capricorn Records picnic.

The band were immediately pressured to record a new album, but declined, in order to see how everyone communicated "musically and spiritually". The band went into rehearsals in Sarasota, Florida, staying together at the Pirates Den on Anna Maria Island. The main reason for living together at the Pirates Den was to see if they could simply get along together. Meanwhile, former record label Capricorn Records had been splintering, and the band were not receiving their royalty payments. An audit revealed Capricorn was deep in debt to PolyGram Records; manager Phil Walden had borrowed $4 million he could not return. Steve Massarsky became the band's manager during this time, and helped renegotiate a deal with Capricorn Records. Despite their past royalty troubles, they trusted in Walden to get the record significant airplay and sales. Despite this, "Dickey Betts filed suit against Walden, alleging nonpayment of record and publishing royalties."

== Recording and production ==
Enlightened Rogues was recorded between December 1978 and January 1979 at Criteria Studios in Miami, Florida. The album was produced by Tom Dowd. The band had not recorded at Criteria, or with Dowd, since 1971. For the album, the band strived to reach their "classic" sound, typified by their earliest releases. Criteria owned a row of houses along Biscayne Bay they allowed artists to stay in while recording; Eric Clapton had named his album 461 Ocean Boulevard after his residence while there. Allman recalled they stayed "three doors down" from that location while recording, and held fond memories for the location: "That place just calmed us all out—really helped us travel back in time. It was just a groove, man, one big family again. The house was huge, so there was plenty of room for all of us." A cook prepared breakfast and dinner for the group, and while all were still regularly using drugs, it was more controlled than it had been in the past.

Things went smoothly during the recording process. Goldflies remarked that Allman and Betts got along well: "What I saw many times, especially towards the beginning, was a real effort from both Gregg and Dickey to be really gracious to each other. I sensed there was a real effort to make it work. They tried to make it happen." Allman described reuniting with Dowd: "We had communication, and I mean the utmost communication. Tom was a master at getting everyone's attention focused on one little item, and I picked up so many little ways to go about things from him, and to keep from wasting time." The band lacked a slide guitarist, leading Betts to take over the role, which he disliked. He later noted that it altered the band's sound, which in its earlier days relied on Betts's guitar and a slide guitar working together with guitarist John Lundahl, a Chicago native. Allman partnered with former confidant Twiggs Lyndon once more as his manager, despite the wishes of Betts. Following a small altercation with Allman, he left the area and ceased being his manager.

Allman wrote "Just Ain't Easy" as a description of years living in Hollywood with pop star Cher, whom he was married to from 1975 to 1979. "It's about defeat and resignation, being on the bottom," he wrote. The album's title comes from a term original guitarist Duane Allman used to describe the band. An avid reader, Duane once told his brother a quote from a poem he read that he felt would make good lyrics: "The world is made of two great schools, enlightened rogues and religious fools." Trucks later summarized the album's recording and release as thus: "The chemistry wasn’t there. The only reason the first album was half successful was that Tom Dowd produced it and worked so hard."

== Release ==
Capricorn Records filed for bankruptcy in October 1979. Betts won a substantial arbitration settlement, and "the rest of the Allman Brothers' members were next in line, likely to be followed by a litany of other Capricorn artists."

== Critical reception ==
Professional ratings
Review scores
Source	Rating
AllMusic	3.5/5 stars
Christgau's Record Guide	C+
The Encyclopedia of Popular Music	3/5 stars
Music Week	4/4 stars
Rolling Stone	(Not Rated)

The New York Times noted that the album "is basically Southern blues and boogie with rock-and-roll energy and some lyrical guitar improvising." The Globe and Mail concluded that "Allman's haunting organ, Betts' plaintive guitar, and Mimi Hart's background vocals combine to make ['Sail Away'] the best song the Allmans have done in years."

== Track listing ==
Side one

1. "Crazy Love" (Dickey Betts) – 3:44
2. "Can't Take It with You" (Dickey Betts, Don Johnson) – 3:33
3. "Pegasus" (Dickey Betts) – 7:31
4. "Need Your Love So Bad" (John Mertis) – 4:01

Side two

1. "Blind Love" (B.B. King, Jules Taub) – 4:37
2. "Try It One More Time" (Dickey Betts, David Goldflies) – 5:04
3. "Just Ain't Easy" (Gregg Allman) – 6:06
4. "Sail Away" (Dickey Betts, John Lundahl) – 3:34

== Personnel ==
- Gregg Allman – Hammond B-3 organ, Fender Rhodes electric piano, Hohner Clavinet, lead vocals, backing vocals
- Dickey Betts – electric, acoustic & slide guitar; lead vocals on 1, 8, co-lead vocals on 6, backing vocals
- "Dangerous" Dan Toler – electric & acoustic guitar
- David "Rook" Goldflies – bass
- Jaimoe – drums, congas
- Butch Trucks – drums, congas, backing vocals

Additional musicians:

- Joe Lala – percussion (3, 5, 6)
- Bonnie Bramlett – background vocals (1)
- Jim Essery – harmonica (2, 4, 5, 7)
- John Lundahl – rhythm guitar (2)
- Mimi Hart – background vocals (8)

== Charts ==
Chart (1979)	Peak position
Canada Top Albums/CDs (RPM)	15
US Billboard 200	9

== Certifications ==
Region	Certification	Certified units/sales
United States (RIAA)	Gold	500,000^{^}
^{^} Shipments figures based on certification alone.
