= Straight from the Heart (The Allman Brothers Band song) =

Single by The Allman Brothers Band

from the album Brothers of the Road
- B-side: "Leavin'"
- Released: July 1981
- Recorded: March 1981
- Studio: Young 'Un Sound, Nashville, Tennessee
- Genre: Country rock; pop; pop rock
- Length: 3:18
- Label: Arista Records 0618
- Songwriters: Dickey Betts; Johnny Cobb
- Producer: John Ryan

The Allman Brothers Band singles chronology
"Mystery Woman" (1980)	"Straight from the Heart" (1981)	"Two Rights" (1981)

"Straight from the Heart" is a song by American rock band the Allman Brothers Band, released in July 1981 as the lead single from the group's eighth studio album, Brothers of the Road (1981). Written by guitarist Dickey Betts and Nashville songwriter Johnny Cobb, the song was a conscious effort to produce a hit single. The Allman Brothers Band had signed to Arista Records in 1980, and founder Clive Davis pushed them to modernize their sound. "Straight from the Heart" was later regarded as an "embarrassing" experiment by members of the band.

Nevertheless, the song became the group's first top 40 hit since their heyday, and subsequently their last: it peaked at number 39 on the Billboard Hot 100. It also hit number 11 on Billboard's Rock Top Tracks chart.

== Background ==
The Allman Brothers Band had signed to Arista Records in 1980 following the collapse of Capricorn Records the previous year. Arista founder Clive Davis pushed the band to modernize their sound, as southern rock was becoming increasingly unpopular. "He wanted us to be a Southern American version of Led Zeppelin and brought in outside producers and it just kept getting worse," said drummer Butch Trucks.

"Straight from the Heart" epitomized the single-oriented sound the band strived for while on Arista. For their second effort on Arista, Brothers of the Road (1981), the group collaborated with "name producer" John Ryan, of Styx and Doobie Brothers fame. "He took them even further away from their roots," said Mike Lawler, a Nashville songwriter who also worked on their Arista debut. He noted that Dickey Betts co-wrote "Straight from the Heart" with fellow songwriter Johnny Cobb, and that "He allowed it to happen; it's not like the two of us came in and dictated to the Allman Brothers Band what they should do and how they should sound." David Goldflies, bassist of the band in this incarnation, attributed the change in direction to the label, management, and the band's own desire to have another hit single. Both Gregg Allman and Trucks later regarded their two Arista albums as a "huge embarrassment," leading to their second breakup in 1982.

Goldflies later spoke on the song, which he deemed an "experiment":

The Allman Brothers swung, playing a lot of triplets with Butch's great shuffle feel, and suddenly we were playing straight eights and everyone felt weird. Their rhythmic feel had swing and polyrhythms—rock with jazz and cool country overtones—and when we played the straight beats on a song like "Straight from the Heart," it felt lifeless. We all tried to make it come alive, but it was an experiment that failed.

== Reception ==
Scott Freeman, author of Midnight Riders: The Story of the Allman Brothers Band (1996), derided the song as a "great Doobie Brothers imitation."

== Chart positions ==
=== Weekly charts ===
Chart (1981)	Peak position
US Billboard Hot 100	39
US Mainstream Rock (Billboard)	11

== Notes ==
=== Sources ===
- Paul, Alan (2014). One Way Out: The Inside History of the Allman Brothers Band. St. Martin's Press. ISBN 978-1250040497.
- Freeman, Scott (1996). Midnight Riders: The Story of the Allman Brothers Band. Little, Brown and Company. ISBN 978-0316294522.
