= Seven Turns (song) =

Single by The Allman Brothers Band

from the album Seven Turns
- A-side: "Good Clean Fun"
- Released: September 1990
- Genre: Country rock, Southern rock
- Length: 5:03
- Label: Epic
- Songwriter: Dickey Betts

The Allman Brothers Band singles chronology
"Good Clean Fun" (1990)	"Seven Turns" (1990)	"It Ain't Over Yet" (1990)

"Seven Turns" is a song written by Dickey Betts and performed by The Allman Brothers Band. The song reached No. 12 on the Billboard Album Rock Tracks chart in 1990. The song appears on their 1990 album, Seven Turns.
