= Good Clean Fun (The Allman Brothers Band song) =

Single by The Allman Brothers Band

from the album Seven Turns
- B-side: "Seven Turns"
- Released: July 1990
- Recorded: April 1990; Criteria Studios (Miami)
- Genre: Country rock, Southern rock
- Length: 5:06
- Label: Epic Records 73504
- Songwriters: Gregg Allman, Dickey Betts, Johnny Neel
- Producer: Tom Dowd

The Allman Brothers Band singles chronology
"Two Rights" (1981)	"Good Clean Fun" (1990)	"Seven Turns" (1990)

Music video
- "Good Clean Fun" on YouTube

"Good Clean Fun" is a song by American rock band the Allman Brothers Band, released in July 1990 as the lead single from the group's ninth studio album, Seven Turns (1990). Written by guitarist Dickey Betts, vocalist Gregg Allman and songwriter Johnny Neel, the song was the band's first single since their 1982 breakup.

"Good Clean Fun" returns to the harmonic guitars and slide hooks the band was known for in the early 1970s. The song reached number one on the Album Rock Tracks chart in 1990.

== Background ==
"Good Clean Fun" was the first song since “Mountain Jam” in 1971 for which Dickey Betts and Gregg Allman received co-writing credits.

== Reception ==
David Browne Rolling Stone labeled "Good Clean Fun" one of the strongest tracks from Seven Turns, calling it "ferocious," and "full of snarly Betts-Haynes leads and the dueling kits of Trucks and Jaimoe."

Scott Freeman, author of Midnight Riders: The Story of the Allman Brothers Band (1996), wrote that the song "jumped off the disc […] It was a sound that was instantly familiar, yet fresh and alive. […] In just the first four minutes, Seven Turns showed more surprises and inventiveness than the previous two Allman Brothers albums combined." Alan Paul, author of One Way Out: The Inside History of the Allman Brothers Band (2014), wrote that "the slide hook and guitar harmonies" established that "[Warren] Haynes and Betts were resurrecting the classic ABB sound and approach."

== Music video ==
The song's music video contains rehearsal footage interspersed with shots of women searching for the musicians backstage.

== Chart positions ==
Chart (1990)	Peak position
US Mainstream Rock (Billboard)	1

== Notes ==
=== Sources ===
- Paul, Alan (2014). One Way Out: The Inside History of the Allman Brothers Band. St. Martin's Press. ISBN 978-1250040497.
- Freeman, Scott (1996). Midnight Riders: The Story of the Allman Brothers Band. Little, Brown and Company. ISBN 978-0316294522.
