= Seven Turns =

Studio album by The Allman Brothers Band
- Released: July 3, 1990
- Recorded: April 1990; Criteria Studios, Miami, FL
- Genres: Southern rock, blues rock, jam rock
- Length: 48:20
- Label: Epic
- Producer: Tom Dowd

The Allman Brothers Band chronology
| Live at Ludlow Garage: 1970 (1990) | Seven Turns (1990) | Shades of Two Worlds (1991) |

Seven Turns is the ninth studio album by the Allman Brothers Band, released in 1990. Their first studio album since Brothers of the Road in 1981, it was well-received, and peaked at #53. Hit singles were "Good Clean Fun" (#1 on the Mainstream Rock Tracks); "Seven Turns" (#12) and "It Ain't Over Yet" (#26).

The Allman Brothers Band broke up for the second time in 1982. They got back together in 1989. Seven Turns was the first album recorded by the re-formed band, with a lineup of Gregg Allman (keyboards), Dickey Betts (guitar), Warren Haynes (guitar), Allen Woody (bass), Johnny Neel (keyboards), Jaimoe (drums), and Butch Trucks (drums).

The instrumental track "True Gravity" was nominated for a Grammy Award for Best Rock Instrumental Performance at the 33rd Annual Grammy Awards in 1991, but it lost to "D/FW" by Vaughan Brothers.

== Critical reception ==
Professional ratings
Review scores
| Source | Rating |
|---|---|
| AllMusic | 4/5 stars |
| The Encyclopedia of Popular Music | 3/5 stars |
| Entertainment Weekly | B+ |
| Rolling Stone | 4/5 stars |
| Select | 3/5 medals |

On AllMusic, Bruce Eder said, "The Allman Brothers Band's comeback album, and their best blues-based outing since Idlewild South that restored a lot of their reputation. With Tom Dowd running the session, and the group free to make the music they wanted to, they ended up producing this bold, rock-hard album, made up mostly of songs by Dickey Betts (with contributions by new keyboardman Johnny Neel and lead guitarist Warren Haynes), almost every one of them a winner."

In Rolling Stone, David Browne wrote, "None of those moments match anything on Eat a Peach or Brothers and Sisters, but Seven Turns isn't about making history; it's about finding joy in inspired professionalism.... In true Southern fashion, a sense of defeatism lingers over Seven Turns. But so does the sense that after all the creased faces and dashed solo careers, the Allmans can still sound like a vibrant, working band – a remarkable accomplishment in itself."

== Track listing ==
1. "Good Clean Fun" (Gregg Allman, Dickey Betts, Johnny Neel) – 5:09
2. "Let Me Ride" (Betts) – 4:36
3. "Low Down Dirty Mean" (Betts, Neel) – 5:30
4. "Shine It On" (Betts, Warren Haynes) – 4:51
5. "Loaded Dice" (Betts, Haynes) – 3:29
6. "Seven Turns" (Betts) – 5:05
7. "Gambler's Roll" (Haynes, Neel) – 6:44
8. "True Gravity" (Betts, Haynes) – 7:58
9. "It Ain't Over Yet" (Doug Crider, Neel) – 4:54

== Personnel ==
The Allman Brothers Band

- Gregg Allman – Hammond B-3 organ; lead vocals on "Good Clean Fun", "Low Down Dirty Mean", "Shine It On", "Gambler's Roll", "It Ain't Over Yet", backup vocals on "Seven Turns"
- Dickey Betts – electric guitar, acoustic guitar, National resonator guitar; lead vocals on "Let Me Ride", "Seven Turns"
- Jaimoe – drums, percussion
- Butch Trucks – drums, timpani
- Warren Haynes – electric guitar; lead vocals on "Loaded Dice", backup vocals on "Let Me Ride", "Shine It On", "Seven Turns", "It Ain't Over Yet"
- Johnny Neel – piano, Wurlitzer organ, synthesizer, harmonica; backup vocals on "Shine It On", "Seven Turns", "It Ain't Over Yet"
- Allen Woody – bass guitar

Additional musicians

- Mark Morris – percussion
- Duane Betts – guitar on "True Gravity"

Production

- Produced by Tom Dowd
- Production coordinator: Bud Snyder
- Engineers: Jay Mark, Bud Snyder, Andy Roshberg

== Charts ==
| Chart (1990) | Peak position |
|---|---|
| Canada Top Albums/CDs (RPM) | 42 |
| Norwegian Albums (VG-lista) | 19 |
| US Billboard 200 | 53 |
