= Crazy Love (Allman Brothers song) =

Single by The Allman Brothers Band

from the album Enlightened Rogues
- B-side: "Just Ain't Easy"
- Released: March 1979
- Recorded: December 1978–January 1979; Criteria Studios, Miami, Florida
- Genre: Southern rock; blues rock
- Length: 3:44
- Label: Capricorn
- Songwriter(s): Dickey Betts
- Producer(s): Tom Dowd

The Allman Brothers Band singles chronology
"Louisiana Lou and Three Card Monty John" (1975)	"Crazy Love" (1979)	"Can't Take It with You" (1979)

"Crazy Love" is a song by the American rock band the Allman Brothers Band. It was the lead single from their sixth studio album, Enlightened Rogues (1979), released on Capricorn Records.

The song was their second-biggest hit (after "Ramblin' Man") on the Billboard Hot 100, peaking at number 29 in 1979.

== Background ==
"Crazy Love" is "an uptempo rocker built around vigorous slide-guitar solos". It features background vocals from singer Bonnie Bramlett.

== Reception ==
Cash Box said it has "winding guitar lines, muscular beat and rough and ready lead and backing vocals".

== Charts ==
Chart (1979)	Peak position
US Billboard Hot 100	29

== Notes ==
=== Sources ===
- Paul, Alan (2014). One Way Out: The Inside History of the Allman Brothers Band. St. Martin's Press. ISBN 978-1250040497.
- Allman, Gregg; Light, Alan (2012). My Cross to Bear. William Morrow. ISBN 978-0062112033.
