= I'm No Angel (album) =

Studio album by Gregg Allman Band
- Released: February 5, 1987
- Genres: Southern rock, pop rock
- Length: 40:40
- Label: Epic
- Producer: Rodney Mills

Gregg Allman Band chronology
Two the Hard Way (1977)	I'm No Angel (1987)	Just Before the Bullets Fly (1988)

Professional ratings
Review scores
Source	Rating
Allmusic	3.5/5 stars
Kerrang!	2/5 stars
Rolling Stone Album Guide	3/5 stars

I'm No Angel is the fourth studio album by the Gregg Allman Band, released on Epic Records in 1987. The album is particularly notable for the strength of its title song, which was later covered by others, including Cher, Gregg Allman's former wife.

== History ==
Three singles were released from the album, in 1987. The title track, "I'm No Angel" peaked at Number 49 on the Billboard Hot 100, but reached Number 1 on Billboard's Mainstream Rock Tracks. "Anything Goes" reached Number 3 on Mainstream Rock Tracks, while "Can't Keep Running" reached Number 25 on the same list. Released in 1987, the album peaked at Number 30 on the Billboard 200.

== Track listing ==
1. "I'm No Angel" (Tony Colton, Phil Palmer) – 3:42
2. "Anything Goes" (Gregg Allman) – 4:12
3. "Evidence of Love" (Chris Farren, Steve Diamond) – 4:34
4. "Yours for the Asking" (Allman, Dan Toler, Frankie Toler) – 3:16
5. "Things That Might Have Been" (Allman, D. Toler) – 4:26
6. "Can't Keep Running" (Michael Bolton, Martin Briley) – 4:02
7. "Faces Without Names" (Allman, D. Toler) – 3:36
8. "Lead Me On" (Allman, D. Toler) – 4:44
9. "Don't Want You No More" (Spencer Davis, Eddie Hardin) – 2:31
10. "It's Not My Cross to Bear" (Allman) – 5:37

== Personnel ==
The Gregg Allman Band

- Gregg Allman – Hammond Organ, Lead Vocals
- Dan Toler – Guitar
- Bruce Waibel – Bass Guitar, Background Vocals
- Tim Heding – Keyboards, Background Vocals
- David Frankie Toler – Drums
- Chaz Trippy – Percussion

Additional musicians

- Ed Callie – Tenor Sax
- Eric White – Horn Arrangements
- Don Johnson – Vocals on track 3 (Evidence of Love)

Production

- Rodney Mills – Producer, Engineer
- Leslie (Lee) Shapiro - Assistant Engineer
- Bud Snyder – Production Coordination
- Recorded and Mixed - Criteria Studios, Miami, Florida
- Bob Ludwig – Mastering
- Brian Hagiwara – Photography
- Holland MacDonald – Art Direction
- Linda Evans Phillips – Artwork

Crew

- John Emery – Stage Manager
- Mike Logan – Stage Technician

== Certifications ==
Region	Certification	Certified units/sales
United States (RIAA)	Gold	500,000^{^}
^{^} Shipments figures based on certification alone.
