= Brothers of the Road (album) =

Studio album by The Allman Brothers Band
- Released: August 1981
- Recorded: March 1981
- Studio: Young 'Un Sound, Nashville, Tennessee
- Genre: Southern rock
- Length: 39:17
- Label: Arista
- Producer: John Ryan

The Allman Brothers Band chronology
Reach for the Sky (1980)	Brothers of the Road (1981)	Brothers of the Road (1982)

Professional ratings
Review scores
Source	Rating
AllMusic	2/5 stars
Rolling Stone	2/5 stars

Brothers of the Road is the eighth studio album, and the tenth album overall, by the rock group the Allman Brothers Band. Released in 1981, it is the band's only album without drummer Jai Johanny Johanson, the last to feature bassist David Goldflies and guitarist Dan Toler, and the only one to feature drummer David Toler. The song "Straight from the Heart" was the group's third and final Top 40 hit. It was also the first Allman Brothers album to not feature an instrumental song.

In 1982 the Allman Brothers Band released a concert video that is also titled Brothers of the Road. However, the video includes live performances of only two songs from the album – "The Judgment" and "Never Knew How Much (I Needed You)".

== Background ==
In 1980, the band's support keyboardist Mike Lawler was promoted to full member, but Jai Johanny Johanson, also known as Jaimoe, left in November of the same year, resulting in the only studio album recorded without Jaimoe. "I Beg of You" is the cover of Elvis Presley's 1958 single B-side.

== Track listing ==
=== Side One ===
1. "Brothers of the Road" (Dickey Betts, Jim Goff) – 3:50
2. "Leavin'" (Gregg Allman) – 3:46
3. "Straight from the Heart" (Betts, Johnny Cobb) – 3:48
4. "The Heat Is On" (Betts, Mike Lawler, Buddy Yochim) – 4:13
5. "Maybe We Can Go Back to Yesterday" (Betts, Dan Toler) – 4:42

=== Side Two ===
1. "The Judgment" (Betts) – 3:39
2. "Two Rights" (Betts, Cobb, Lawler) – 3:30
3. "Never Knew How Much (I Needed You)" (Allman) – 4:45
4. "Things You Used to Do" (Allman, Keith England) – 3:42
5. "I Beg of You" (Rose Marie McCoy, Kelly Owens) – 3:22

== Personnel ==
=== The Allman Brothers Band ===
- Gregg Allman – lead vocals, Hammond B-3 organ, acoustic guitar
- Dickey Betts – lead, slide and acoustic guitar; lead vocals on 1, 4, 6, 7
- Butch Trucks – drums
- David "Rook" Goldflies – bass
- Mike Lawler – acoustic and electric pianos, synthesizers, Hohner Clavinet
- "Dangerous" Dan Toler – lead and rhythm guitar
- David "Frankie" Toler – drums

=== Additional musicians ===
- Charlie Daniels – fiddle on "Brothers of the Road"
- Jimmy Hall – sax on "Never Knew How Much (I Needed You)"
- Mark "Tito" Morris – congas, timbales, percussion
- Background vocalists: Thomas Cain, Johnny Cobb, Jimmy Hall, Chip Young, Greg Guidry, Joy Lannon, Donna McElroy, Keith England, Jeff Silverman, Randall Hart, Peter Kingsberry, Joe Pizzulo

== Charts ==
Chart (1981)	Peak position
US Billboard 200	44
