= Gregg Allman Band =

American musical group (1986–2017)

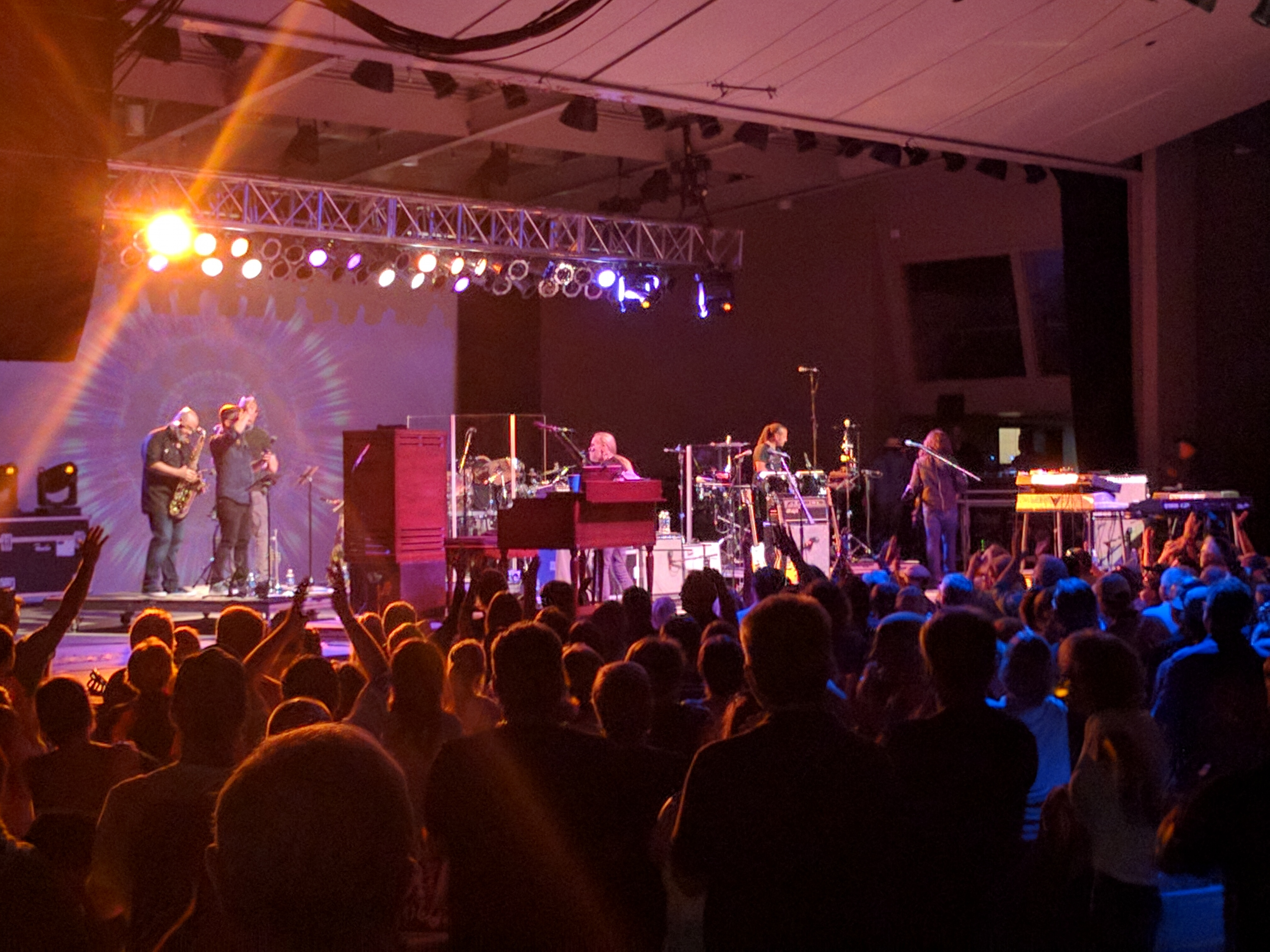
- The Gregg Allman Band performing in 2016

Background information
- Genres: Southern rock, blues rock
- Years active: 1986–2017
- Label: Epic
- Past members: Gregg Allman; Floyd Miles; Bruce Katz; Scott Sharrard; Jerry Jemmott; Steve Potts; Jay Collins; Dan Toler; David Toler; Bruce Waibel; Tim Heding; Charles "Chaz" Trippy

The Gregg Allman Band, also known as Gregg Allman & Friends, was a Southern rock/blues rock group that Gregg Allman established and had led since the 1970s, during periods when Allman has been recording and performing separate from the Allman Brothers Band and has chosen not to perform exclusively as a solo artist.

== Line ups ==
=== 1984-1988 ===
(At the time of I'm No Angel and Just Before The Bullets Fly)

- Gregg Allman – Hammond Organ, Acoustic and Electric Guitar, Lead Vocals
- Dan Toler – Guitar
- David Toler – Drums
- Bruce Waibel – Bass Guitar, Background Vocals
- Tim Heding – Keyboards, Background Vocals
- Charles "Chaz" Trippy – Percussion

=== More recent line up ===
- Gregg Allman – Vocals, guitar, Hammond B-3
- Floyd Miles – Percussion, vocals
- Bruce Katz – Keyboards
- Scott Sharrard – Guitar
- Jerry Jemmott – Bass
- Steve Potts – Drums
- Jay Collins – Horns

== Deaths ==
The band dissolved following the death of Gregg Allman in May 2017.

Floyd Miles died on 26 January 2018, at the age of 74.
