= The Allman Brothers Band =

American rock band

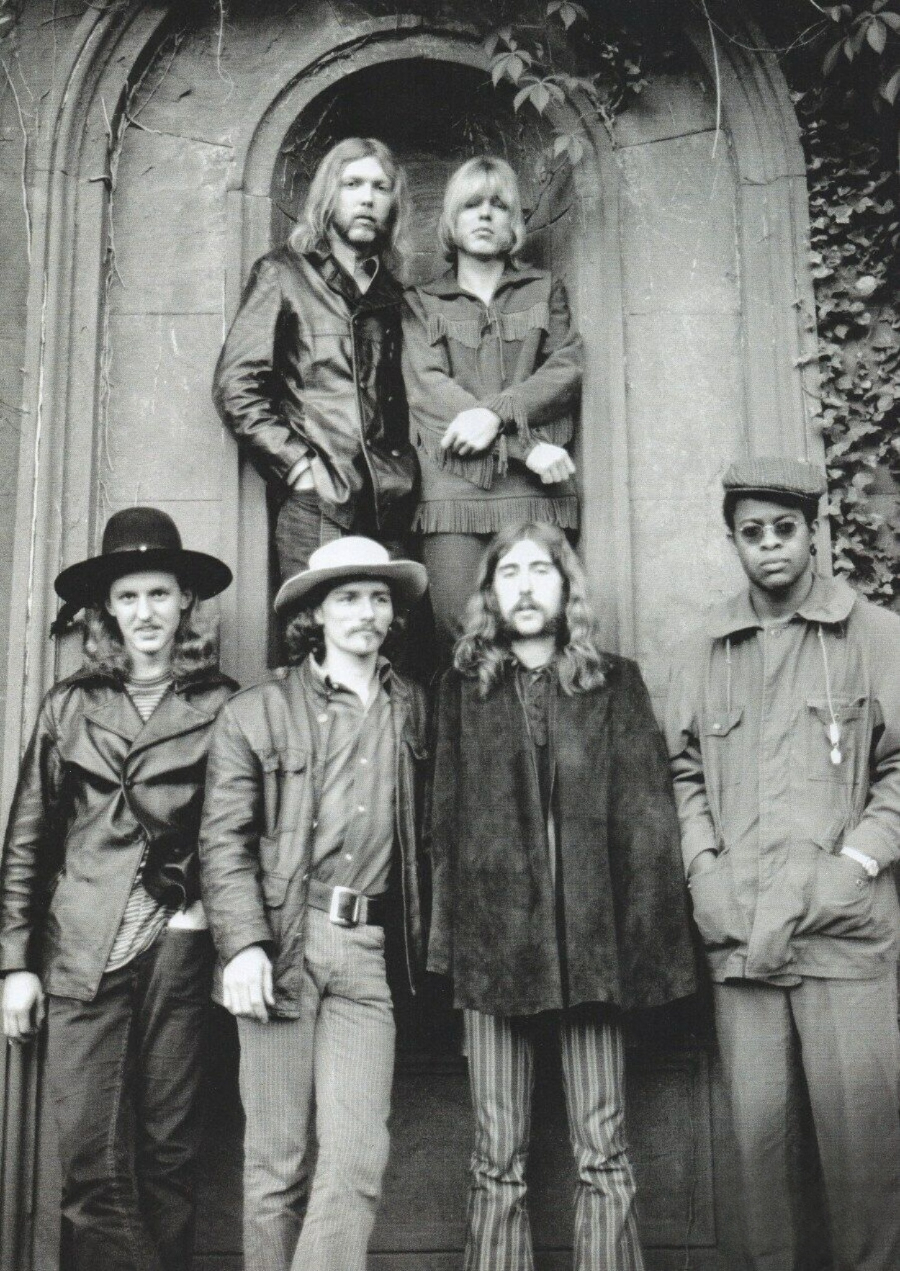
- The Allman Brothers Band in May 1969. From left to right, (back) Duane Allman, Gregg Allman; (front) Butch Trucks, Dickey Betts, Berry Oakley, and Jaimoe.

Background information
- Origin: Jacksonville, Florida, U.S.
- Genres: Southern rock; blues rock; jazz rock; jam band
- Years active: 1969–1976; 1978–1982; 1989–2014
- Labels: Capricorn; PolyGram; Arista; Epic; Sanctuary
- Spinoffs: Sea Level; Great Southern; Gregg Allman Band; Gov't Mule; Frogwings; Tedeschi Trucks Band; Les Brers; The Allman Betts Band
- Past members: Duane Allman; Gregg Allman; Dickey Betts; Jaimoe; Berry Oakley; Butch Trucks; Chuck Leavell; Lamar Williams; David Goldflies; Dan Toler; Mike Lawler; David "Frankie" Toler; Warren Haynes; Johnny Neel; Allen Woody; Marc Quiñones; Oteil Burbridge; Jack Pearson; Derek Trucks; Jimmy Herring
- Website: allmanbrothersband.com

The Allman Brothers Band was an American rock band formed in Jacksonville, Florida, in 1969. Brothers Duane (slide guitar, lead guitar) and Gregg Allman (vocals, keyboards) founded it with Dickey Betts (lead guitar, vocals), Berry Oakley (bass), Butch Trucks (drums), and Jai Johanny "Jaimoe" Johanson (drums). Subsequently based in Macon, Georgia, they incorporated elements of blues, jazz and country music and their live shows featured jam band-style improvisation and instrumentals.

The band's first two studio albums, The Allman Brothers Band (1969) and Idlewild South (1970), both released by Capricorn Records, were not commercially successful, but their 1971 live album At Fillmore East was a critical and commercial breakthrough. It included extended versions of "In Memory of Elizabeth Reed" and "Whipping Post", showcasing the group's jamming style. Group leader Duane was killed in a motorcycle accident in 1971; however the band continued, releasing Eat a Peach in 1972, a dual studio/live album that cemented the band's popularity and featured Gregg's "Melissa" and Betts's "Blue Sky". Following the motorcycling death of Oakley in 1972, the group recruited keyboardist Chuck Leavell and bassist Lamar Williams for 1973's Brothers and Sisters. The album included Betts's hit single "Ramblin' Man" and instrumental "Jessica", both of which went on to become classic rock radio staples and placed the group at the forefront of 1970s rock music. Internal turmoil overtook them soon after as the group dissolved in 1976, reforming briefly in 1978 with additional personnel changes and breaking up again in 1982. The band re-formed once more in 1989, releasing a string of new albums and touring heavily. A series of personnel changes in the late 1990s was capped by the departure of Betts. The group found stability during the 2000s with bassist Oteil Burbridge and guitarists Warren Haynes and Derek Trucks (the nephew of Butch) and became renowned for their month-long concert residencies at New York City's Beacon Theatre each spring. The band retired in October 2014 after their final show at the Beacon Theatre. Butch Trucks and Gregg both died in 2017, and Betts died in 2024, leaving Jaimoe as the only surviving original member.

The band was awarded seven Gold and four Platinum albums by the Recording Industry Association of America (RIAA), and was inducted into the Rock and Roll Hall of Fame in 1995. In 2010, Rolling Stone magazine ranked the band 52nd on its list of the "100 Greatest Artists of All Time".

== History ==
=== Roots and formation (1965–1969) ===
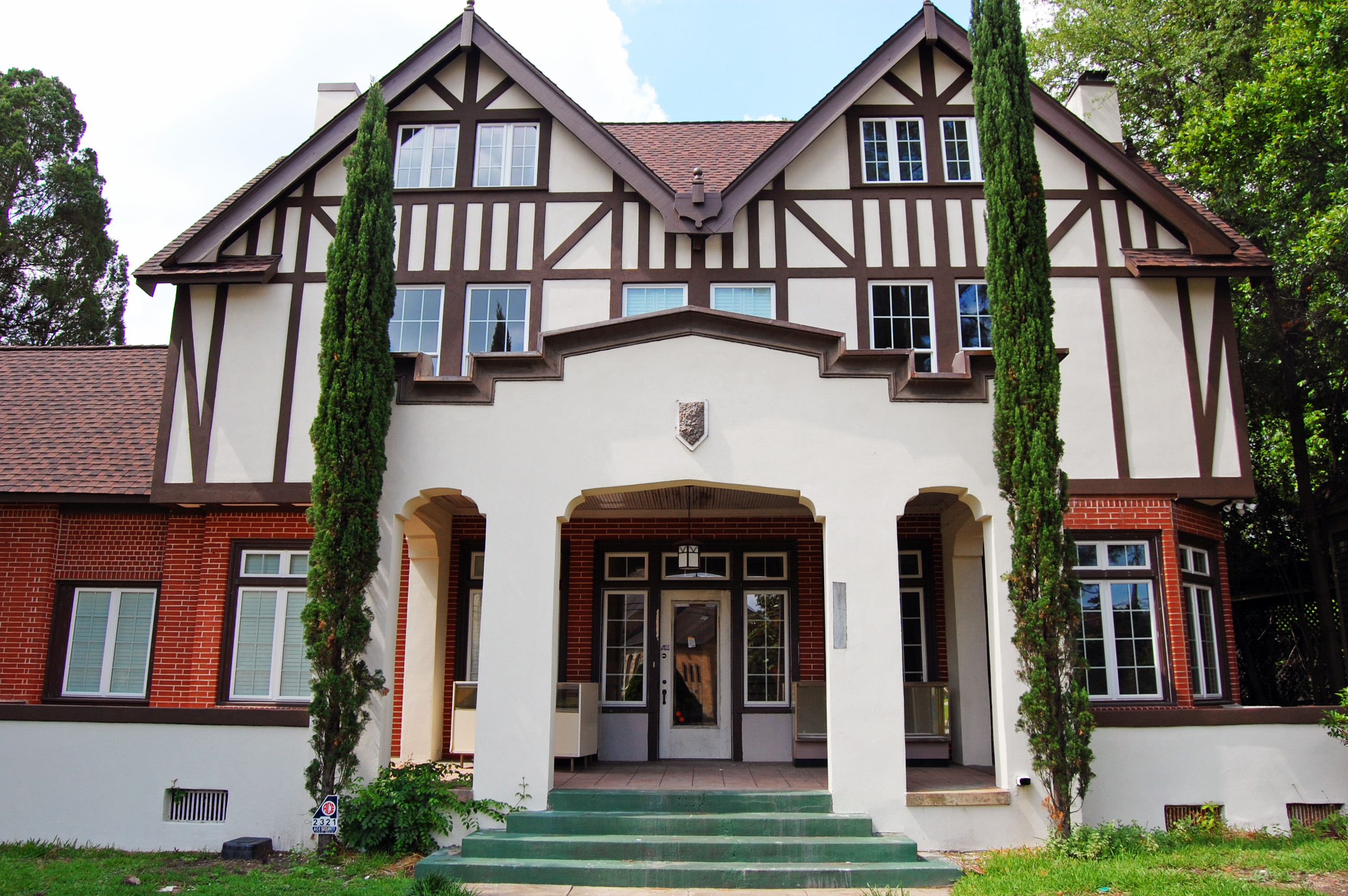
"The Big House" in Macon, Georgia, where the band lived in the early 1970s

Guitarist Duane Allman and his younger brother Gregg grew up in Daytona Beach, Florida, after moving from their native Nashville, Tennessee, in 1959. Duane and Gregg became friends with a black youth named Floyd Miles and the three began to spend their time at local rhythm & blues clubs, where they participated in jam sessions with some of the bands. Miles later remembered, "Gregg was a longhaired musician, so back then he was a freak. And I'm black. So we both knew what it was like to be discriminated against, which is probably why we got along so well. We had each other and we had the music." The brothers formed and performed in several local rock bands such as the Escorts and the Allman Joys. By 1967, the group was performing in St. Louis, where a Los Angeles-based recording executive discovered them; they consequently moved out West and were renamed the Hour Glass, releasing two unsuccessful albums for Liberty Records. Duane moved back to pursue a career as a session musician in Muscle Shoals, Alabama, while Gregg stayed in Los Angeles bound by contractual obligations with Liberty, who believed he could hold a solo career. The two were apart for the first time for a year, but reconvened in Miami, producing an album-length demo with the 31st of February, a group that included drummer Butch Trucks.

At FAME Studios in Muscle Shoals, Duane became the primary session guitarist, recording with artists such as Aretha Franklin and King Curtis. Duane suggested to Wilson Pickett they record a cover of "Hey Jude" by the Beatles; the single went to number 23 on the national charts. FAME signed Duane to a five-year recording contract, and he put together a group, including drummer Johnny Sandlin and keyboardist Paul Hornsby. Duane recruited Jai Johanny Johanson (Jaimoe) after hearing his drumming on a songwriting demo of Jackie Avery, and the two moved into his home on the Tennessee River. Allman invited bassist Berry Oakley to jam with the new group; the pair had met in a Macon, Georgia, club some time earlier, and became quick friends. The group had immediate chemistry, and Duane's vision for a "different" band, one with two lead guitarists and two drummers, began to come to fruition. Meanwhile, Phil Walden, who managed Otis Redding and several other R&B acts, was looking to expand into rock acts. FAME owner Rick Hall became frustrated with the group's recording methods, and offered the tracks recorded and their contract to Walden and Jerry Wexler of Atlantic Records, who purchased them for $10,000 (about $90,000 in 2026). Walden intended the upcoming group to be the centerpiece of his new Atlantic-distributed label, Capricorn.

Duane and Jaimoe moved to Jacksonville, Florida, in early March 1969, as Duane had become frustrated with being a "robot" of those at FAME. He invited anyone who wanted to join to the jam sessions that birthed the Allman Brothers Band. Dickey Betts, leader of Oakley's previous band, the Second Coming, became the group's second lead guitarist, while Butch Trucks, with whom Duane and Gregg had cut a demo less than a year prior, became the new group's second drummer. The Second Coming's Reese Wynans played keyboards, and Duane, Oakley, and Betts all shared vocal duties. The unnamed group began to perform free shows in Willow Branch Park in Jacksonville, with an ever-changing, rotating cast of musicians. Duane felt strongly his brother should be the vocalist of the new group (which effectively eliminated Wynans's position, as Gregg also played keyboards). Gregg left Los Angeles and entered rehearsal on March 26, 1969, when the group was rehearsing Muddy Waters' "Trouble No More" Although Gregg was initially intimidated by the musicians, Duane pressured his brother into "singing [his] guts out." Four days later, the group made their debut at the Jacksonville Armory. Although many potential band names were kicked around, including Beelzebub, the six-piece eventually decided on the Allman Brothers Band.

=== Debut and early years (1969–1970) ===
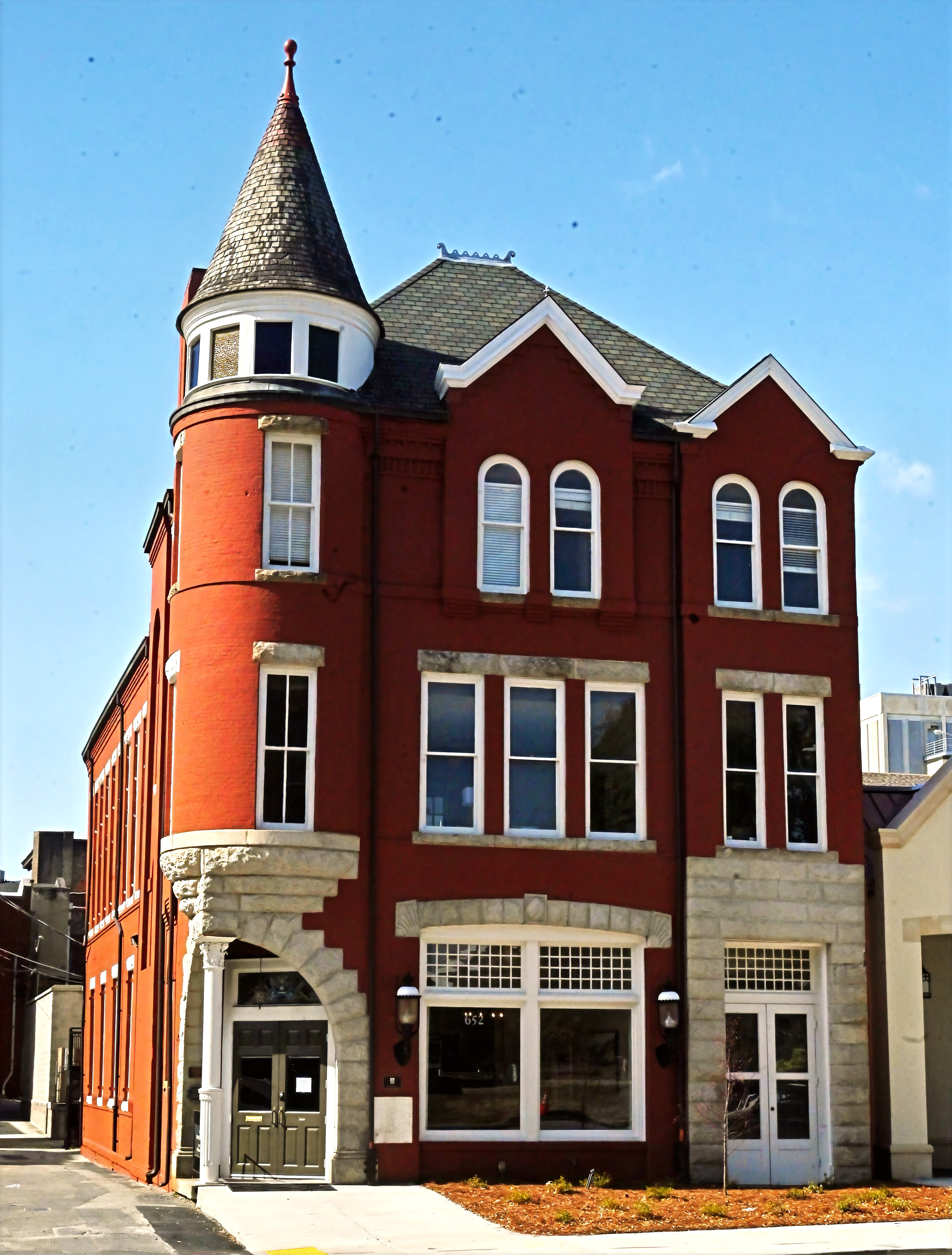
Location of the band's first paid performance

The group moved to Macon, Georgia, by May 1, 1969, where Walden was establishing Capricorn Records. Their first paid performance was on May 2, at the College Discotheque in Macon (now known as the Library Ballroom).

Kim Payne, Mike Callahan and Joseph "Red Dog" Campbell became the band's early crew members. "Red Dog" was a disabled Vietnam veteran who donated his monthly disability checks to the band's cause. In Macon, the group stayed at friend Twiggs Lyndon's apartment on 309 College Street, which became known as the communal home of the band and crew, nicknamed the Hippie Crash Pad. "There were five or six occupied apartments in the building with the Hippie Crash Pad and you would expect they would call the police on us because we were constantly raising hell at three or four in the morning, but they all just moved out," said Trucks. Living meagerly, they found a friend in "Mama Louise" Hudson, cook and proprietor of the H&H Soul Food Restaurant, who ran a tab when they were short of funds, early on made good with proceeds from Duane's recording sessions on the side. The band's image was radical in the just barely integrated Macon: "A lot of the white folk around here did not approve of them long-haired boys, or of them always having a black guy with them," said Hudson. The band performed locally, as well as 80 miles north in Atlanta's Piedmont Park, and practiced at the newly minted Capricorn nearly each day.

The group forged a strong brotherhood, spending countless hours rehearsing, consuming psychedelic drugs, and hanging out in Rose Hill Cemetery, where they wrote songs. Their first performances outside the South came on May 30 and 31 in Boston, opening for The Velvet Underground. In need of more material, the group remade old blues numbers such as "Trouble No More" and "One Way Out", in addition to improvised jams such as "Mountain Jam". Gregg, who had struggled to write in the past, became the band's sole songwriter, composing songs such as "Whipping Post" and "Black-Hearted Woman". The band was originally set to record their first album in Miami with producer Tom Dowd, who had worked with Cream and John Coltrane, but Dowd proved to be unavailable. Instead, they headed off for New York City in August 1969 to work with Atlantic house engineer Adrian Barber in his first producer credit. The Allman Brothers Band was recorded and mixed in two weeks, and proved a positive experience for the ensemble. New York came to be regarded within the group as their "second home". The Allman Brothers Band was released in November 1969 through Atco and Capricorn Records, but received a poor commercial response, selling less than 35,000 copies upon initial release.

Executives suggested to Walden that he relocate the band to New York or Los Angeles to "acclimate" them to the industry. "They wanted us to act 'like a rock band' and we just told them to fuck themselves," remembered Trucks. For their part, the members of the band remained optimistic, electing to stay in the South. "Everyone told us we'd fall by the wayside down there," said Gregg Allman, but the collaboration between the band and Capricorn Records "transformed Macon from this sleepy little town into a very hip, wild and crazy place filled with bikers and rockers". The band rented a $165-a-month farmhouse on a lake outside of Macon (about $1,485 in 2026), the busy comings and goings at which reminded them of New York City's Idlewild Airport. Idlewild South was the home of rehearsals and parties, and was "where the brotherhood came to pass," according to roadie Kim Payne; "There was a pact made out there around a campfire—all for one and one for all ... Everybody believed [in the band] 100 percent." Much of the material presented on the band's second album, Idlewild South, originated at the cabin. Oakley's wife rented a large Tudor Revival home on 2321 Vineville Avenue in Macon and the band moved into what they dubbed "the Big House" in March 1970.

=== Live reputation, At Fillmore East, and breakthrough (1970–1971) ===
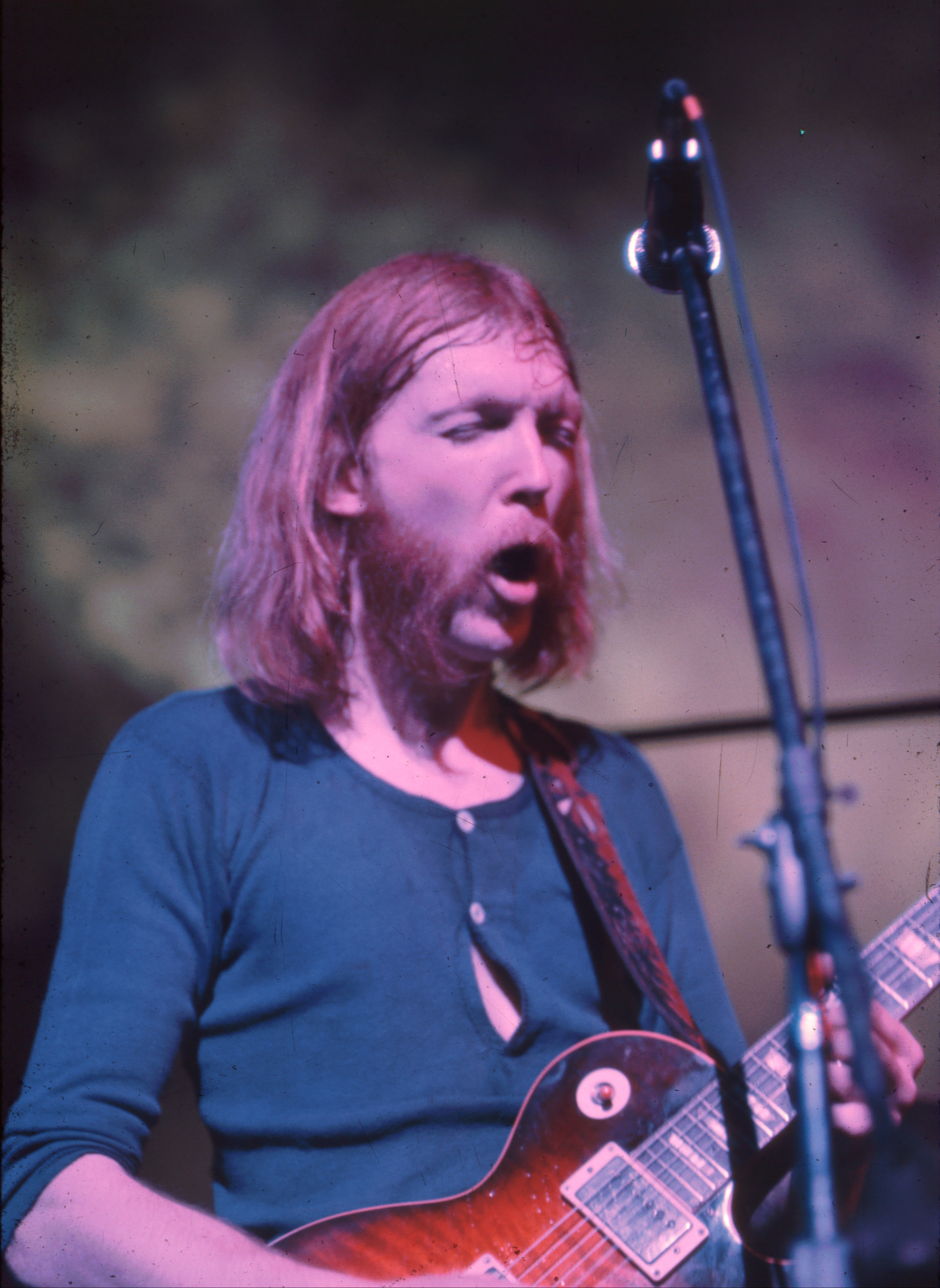
Duane Allman, the group's leader, was killed in a motorcycle crash in 1971.

The band played continuously in 1970, performing over 300 dates on the road traveling in a Ford Econoline van and later, a Winnebago, nicknamed the Wind Bag. Walden doubted the band's future, worrying whether they would ever catch on, but word of mouth spread due to the band's relentless touring schedule, and crowds got larger. The close proximity of the Winnebago brought about heavy drug use within the group, and all in the group, with the exception of the brothers, were struggling to make a living. In one instance, touring manager Twiggs Lyndon stabbed and killed a promoter for not paying the band; he later cited temporary insanity. Later that year, Duane accidentally overdosed on opium after a show. The band's sophomore album, Idlewild South, produced by Tom Dowd, was recorded gradually over a period of five months in various cities, including New York, Miami, and Macon, and contained two of the band's best-known songs, "Midnight Rider" (later a hit for various artists, including a Top 20 solo effort by Gregg) and "In Memory of Elizabeth Reed", which became one of the band's famous concert numbers.

Idlewild South was issued by Atco and Capricorn Records in September 1970, less than a year after their debut. The album sold only "marginally better than its predecessor, though the band had a growing national reputation and the album included songs that would become staples of the band's repertoire—and eventually of rock radio." Shortly after completing recording, Dowd put Duane in contact with guitarist Eric Clapton, who invited him to contribute to his new project, Derek and the Dominos. Allman was a huge fan of Clapton's work with Cream, and Clapton had been blown away by Allman's session work on Wilson Pickett's "Hey Jude" some years prior. They met after a show one night in Miami and jammed together until the next afternoon, with the two guitarists regarding one another as "instant soulmates". Clapton invited Duane to join Derek and the Dominos, and by several accounts he considered it; in the end, he declined the offer and rejoined the Allman Brothers Band, returning after missing a string of several shows. The sessions were collected on Layla and Other Assorted Love Songs, issued that November.

Their fortunes began to change over the course of 1971, when the band's average earnings doubled. "We realized that the audience was a big part of what we did, which couldn't be duplicated in a studio. A lightbulb finally went off; we needed to make a live album," said Gregg Allman. The resulting live album, At Fillmore East, was recorded over three nights—March 11, 12 and 13, 1971—at the Fillmore East in New York, for which the band was paid a nightly $1,250 ($10,191.76 in 2026). At Fillmore East was released in July 1971 by Capricorn Records as a double album, "people-priced" for the cost of a single LP. While previous albums by the band had taken months to hit the charts (often near the bottom of the top 200), the record started to climb the charts after a matter of days. At Fillmore East peaked at number 13 on Billboard's Top Pop Albums chart, and was certified gold by the Recording Industry Association of America that October, becoming their commercial and artistic breakthrough. The album is considered among the best live albums of all time, and in 2004 was one of the albums selected for preservation in the Library of Congress, deemed "culturally, historically, or aesthetically significant" by the National Recording Registry.

=== Eat a Peach and Duane Allman's and Berry Oakley's deaths (1971–1972) ===
Although At Fillmore East brought the band more success and wealth than ever before, many of the band and its entourage were struggling with heroin addiction. Four individuals—group leader Duane Allman, bassist Berry Oakley, and roadies Robert Payne and Red Dog Campbell—checked into the Linwood-Bryant Hospital for rehabilitation in October 1971. On October 29, 1971, Duane Allman, then 24, was killed in a motorcycle accident one day after returning to Macon. Allman was riding his motorcycle fast at the intersection of Hillcrest Avenue and Bartlett Street as a flatbed truck carrying a lumber crane approached. The truck stopped suddenly in the intersection, forcing Allman to swerve his Harley-Davidson Sportster motorcycle sharply to the left to avoid a collision. As he was doing so, he struck either the back of the truck or the ball on the lumber crane and was thrown from the motorcycle. The motorcycle bounced into the air, landed on Allman and skidded another 90 feet with Allman pinned underneath, crushing his internal organs. Though he was alive when he arrived at the hospital, despite immediate emergency surgery, he died several hours later from massive internal injuries.

After Duane's death, the band held a meeting on their future; clearly all wanted to continue, and after a short period, the band returned to the road. "We all had this thing in us and Duane put it there. He was the teacher and he gave something to us—his disciples—that we had to play out," said drummer Butch Trucks. The band returned to Miami in December to complete work on their third studio album, Eat a Peach. Completing its recording raised each member's spirits; "The music brought life back to us all, and it was simultaneously realized by every one of us. We found strength, vitality, newness, reason, and belonging as we worked on finishing Eat a Peach," said Allman. "Those last three songs [...] just kinda floated right on out of us [...] The music was still good, it was still rich, and it still had that energy—it was still the Allman Brothers Band." Released in February 1972, Eat a Peach was the band's second hit album, shipping gold and peaking at number four on Billboard's Top 200 Pop Albums chart. "We'd been through hell, but somehow we were rolling bigger than ever," said Gregg Allman.

The band performed nearly 90 shows in the following year, touring as a five-piece. The band also purchased 432 acres of land in Juliette, Georgia for $160,000 and nicknamed it "the Farm"; it soon became a group hangout and fulfilled bassist Oakley's communal dreams. Oakley, however, was visibly suffering from the death of his friend: he drank excessively, heavily consumed drugs, and was losing weight quickly. According to friends and family, he appeared to have lost "all hope, his heart, his drive, his ambition, [and] his direction" following Duane's death. "Everything Berry had envisioned for everybody—including the crew, the women and children—was shattered on the day Duane died, and he didn't care after that," said roadie Kim Payne. Oakley repeatedly wished to "get high, be high, and stay high," causing quiet concern from all those around him. On November 11, 1972, slightly inebriated and overjoyed at the prospect of leading a jam session later that night, Oakley crashed his motorcycle into the side of a bus, just three blocks from where Duane had been killed. He declined hospital treatment and went home, but gradually grew delirious. He was taken to the hospital shortly thereafter and died of cerebral swelling caused by a fractured skull. Oakley was buried directly beside Duane at Rose Hill Cemetery in Macon.

=== Brothers and Sisters, celebrity, and inner turmoil (1973–1976) ===
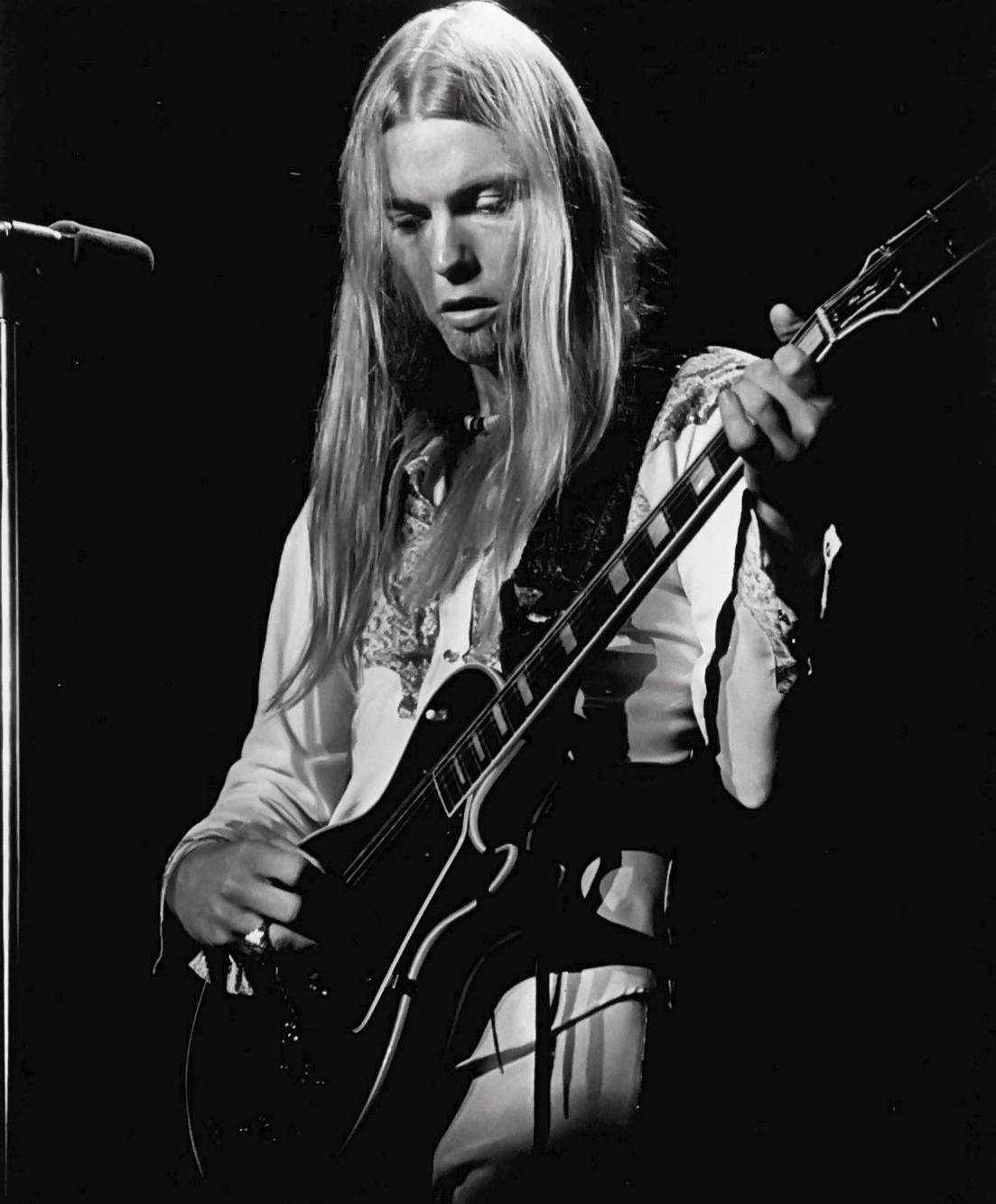
Gregg Allman on the band's 1975 tour

The band unanimously decided to carry on and arranged auditions for new bassists, with a renewed fervor and determination. Several bassists auditioned and the band eventually chose Lamar Williams, an old friend of drummer Jai Johanny Johanson's from Gulfport, Mississippi, two years removed from an Army stint in Vietnam. Chuck Leavell was asked to play piano for Allman's solo album, Laid Back (1973), and gradually found himself contributing to the Allman Brothers as well. Dickey Betts became the group's de facto leader during the recording process. "It's not like Dickey came in and said, 'I'm taking over. I'm the boss. Do this and that.' It wasn't overt; it was still supposedly a democracy, but Dickey started doing more and more of the songwriting," said road manager Willie Perkins. The band's fourth studio album, Brothers and Sisters, was released in August 1973 and became their biggest success yet, peaking at number one and resulting in the band being considered "the most popular band in the country." "Ramblin' Man", Betts' country-infused number, received interest from radio stations immediately, and it rose to number two on the Billboard Hot 100.

The Allman Brothers Band returned to touring, playing larger venues, receiving more profit and dealing with less friendship, miscommunication, and spiraling drug problems. This culminated in a backstage brawl when the band played with the Grateful Dead at Washington's RFK Stadium in June 1973, which resulted in the firing of three of the band's longtime roadies. The band played arenas and stadiums almost solely as their drug use escalated. In 1974, the band was regularly making $100,000 per show, and was renting the Starship, a customized Boeing 720B used by Led Zeppelin and the Rolling Stones. "When [we] got that goddamn plane, it was the beginning of the end," said Allman. Both Allman and Betts released top-20 solo albums in 1974 (The Gregg Allman Tour and Highway Call).

In July 1974 the band visited Europe for the first time. They had planned to tour Britain and Europe at the beginning of that year, but the 1973–74 energy crisis forced a last-minute postponement. They headlined 2 big out-door events. One, the 'Summerconcert '74' at the Sportpark, Hilversum, the Netherlands, on July 18, attended by 20,000 spectators, and the second one, at 'Bucolic Frolic', the first Knebworth Park Festival, on July 20, where they played a well-received three-hour two-set performance in front of 70,000 fans, from all over Europe.

The sessions that produced 1975's Win, Lose or Draw, the last album by the original Allman Brothers Band, were disjointed and inconsistent; Gregg Allman was largely living in Los Angeles and dating pop star Cher, and was, according to biographer Alan Paul, "[becoming] more famous for being famous than for his music." His vocals were recorded there, as he could not be bothered to return to Macon. Upon its release, it was considered subpar and sold less than its predecessor; the band later remarked that they were "embarrassed" about the album.

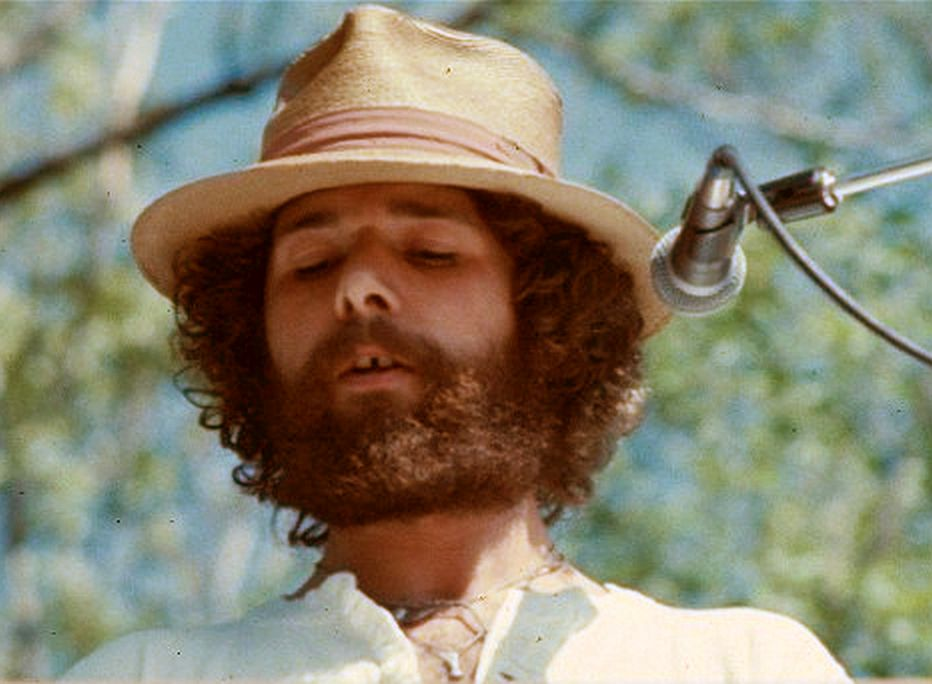
Keyboardist Chuck Leavell began contributing to the band in 1973.

From August 1975 to May 1976, the Allman Brothers Band played 41 shows to some of the biggest crowds of their career. Gradually, the members of the band grew apart during these tours, with sound checks and rehearsals "[becoming] a thing of the past." Allman later pointed to a benefit for presidential candidate Jimmy Carter (an avowed fan of the group) as the only real "high point" in an otherwise "rough, rough tour." The shows were considered lackluster and the members were excessive in their drug use. The "breaking point" came when Gregg Allman testified in the trial of security man Scooter Herring. Bandmates considered him a "snitch", and he received death threats, leading to law-enforcement protection. Herring was convicted on five counts of conspiracy to distribute cocaine and received a 75-year prison sentence, which was later reduced prior to a presidential pardon from Carter. For his part, Allman always maintained that Herring had told him to take the deal to turn state's evidence and that he (Herring) would take the fall; nevertheless, the band refused to communicate with Allman after the incident. As a result, the band finally broke up; Leavell, Williams, and Jaimoe continued playing together in Sea Level, Betts formed Great Southern, and Allman founded the Gregg Allman Band. The 1976 live album Wipe the Windows, Check the Oil, Dollar Gas was seen as "the last gasp of a dying band,"; this was unfortunate for the now-floundering Capricorn Records, as the label was relying on the band staying together to stay financially afloat.

=== First reunion, subsequent break-up, and interim years (1979–1988) ===
In 1978, Allman and Walden first approached Betts with the idea of a reunion. Their first public appearance together came at a Great Southern show in New York's Central Park that summer, when Allman, Trucks, and Jaimoe joined the band for a few songs. Williams and Leavell declined to leave Sea Level, so the Allman Brothers Band hired guitarist Dan Toler and bassist David Goldflies from Great Southern. The band reunited with Tom Dowd at Criteria Studios in Miami to cut their reunion album, which was released in February 1979 as Enlightened Rogues, a term Duane had used to describe the band. While the band "tried to make it happen," they later concluded that the chemistry was not there; the album was a minor commercial success, which was credited to the production work from Dowd. Betts filed a lawsuit against Walden for nonpayment of record and publishing royalties, and Betts's lawyer, Steve Massarsky, began managing the group. Betts won the lawsuit, and the rest of the band filed suit while Capricorn declared bankruptcy that October. Massarsky led the successful effort to sign the band with Arista, which pushed the band to "modernize" their sound. "[Arista founder] Clive Davis destroyed any hope that we had that we could make the thing work again," said Trucks later. "He wanted us to be a Southern American version of Led Zeppelin and brought in outside producers and it just kept getting worse."

Their first Arista effort, Reach for the Sky (1980), was produced by Nashville songwriters Mike Lawler and Johnny Cobb. Bonnie Bramlett, who toured with the band near the end of the decade, sang lead on one song. Lawler soon became a part of the band's touring ensemble, incorporating center-stage keytar solos "that most fans consider the band's nadir." Drugs remained a problem with the band, particularly among Betts and Allman. Although the album was made with the intention of creating a hit single, the genre of Southern rock was waning considerably in the mainstream. The band again grew apart, firing longtime roadie "Red Dog" and replacing Jaimoe with Toler's brother Frankie, who had been a member of Great Southern. The main point of contention was Jaimoe's insistence that his wife and manager, Candace Oakley (Berry's sister), handle his business affairs. "One of the real blights on the history of the Allman Brothers Band was that Jaimoe, this gentle man, was fired from this organization," said Allman later. Not long after, "the band changed managers, hiring the promoter John Scher after Massarsky eased himself out, reportedly saying, 'It's a million-dollar headache and a quarter-million-dollar job.'"

For their second and final album with Arista, Brothers of the Road (1981), they collaborated with a "name producer" (John Ryan, of Styx and the Doobie Brothers), who pushed the band even harder to change their sound. "Straight from the Heart" was the album's single, which became a minor hit but heralded the group's last appearance on the top 40 charts. The band, considering their post-reunion albums "embarrassing", subsequently broke up in 1982 after clashing with Clive Davis, who rejected every producer the band suggested for a possible third album, including Tom Dowd and Johnny Sandlin. "We broke up in '82 because we decided we better just back out or we would ruin what was left of the band's image," said Betts. The band's final performance came on Saturday Night Live in January 1982, where they performed "Southbound" and "Leavin'". The members regrouped occasionally in the intervening years; in 1986, Betts and Allman toured together, with each opening for one another and collaborating for a set. The full Allman Brothers Band—Allman, Betts, Trucks, Jaimoe, Leavell and Dan Toler—also reunited twice in 1986 for the Volunteers Jam and Crackdown on Crack concerts. Allman's solo career began looking up when he released his first solo album in over a decade in 1987, I'm No Angel. The title track became a surprise hit on radio, peaking at No. 49 on the Billboard Hot 100 and No. 1 on the magazine's Mainstream Rock Tracks chart.

=== Second reunion and heavy touring (1989–1996) ===
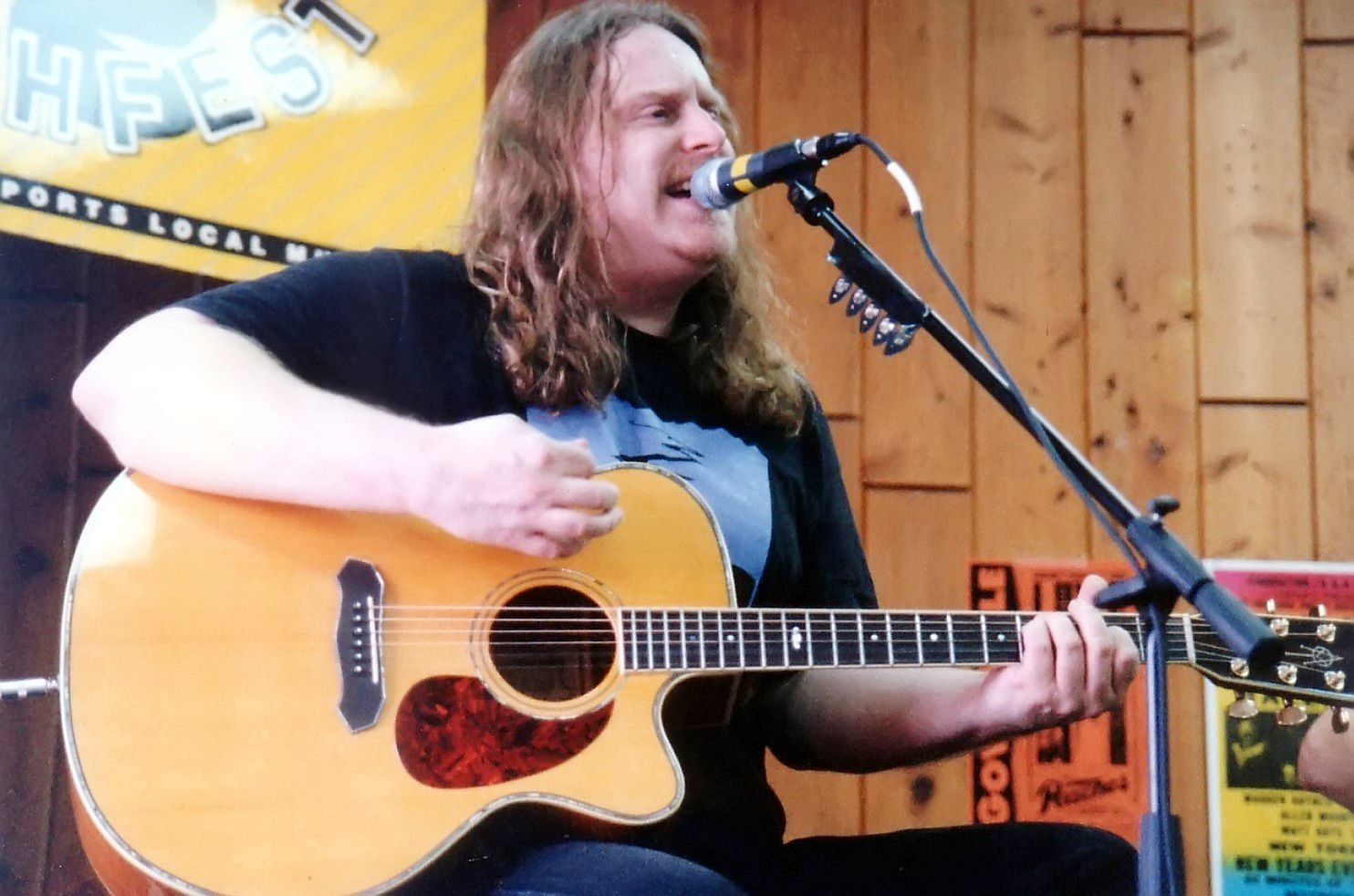
Guitarist Warren Haynes, seen here in the late 1990s, joined the band for their second reunion.

The Allman Brothers Band celebrated its twentieth anniversary in 1989, and the band reunited for a summer tour, with Jaimoe once again on drums. In addition, they featured guitarist Warren Haynes and pianist Johnny Neel, both from the Dickey Betts Band, and bassist Allen Woody, who was hired after open auditions held at Trucks' Florida studio. The classic rock radio format had given the band's catalog songs new relevance, as did a multi-CD retrospective box set, Dreams. Epic, who had worked with Allman on his solo career, signed the band. Danny Goldberg became the band's manager; he had previously worked with acts such as Led Zeppelin and Bonnie Raitt. The group were initially reluctant to tour, but found they performed solidly; in addition, former roadies such as "Red Dog" returned. The band returned to the studio with longtime producer Tom Dowd for 1990's Seven Turns, which was considered a return to form. "Good Clean Fun" and "Seven Turns" each became big hits on the Mainstream Rock Tracks chart. The addition of Haynes and Woody had "reenergized" the ensemble. Neel left the group in 1990, and the band added percussionist Marc Quiñones, formerly of Spyro Gyra, the following year.

The band performed 87 shows in 1991, and 77 the following year. The band did not renew Goldberg's contract as manager, and as a result, their tour manager, Bert Holman, became the band's full-time manager in 1991 and remained so for the rest of their career. Their next studio effort, Shades of Two Worlds (1991), produced the crowd favorite "Nobody Knows". The band also released a live album, An Evening with the Allman Brothers Band: First Set, recorded at their 1992 residency at New York's Beacon Theatre. The band performed ten consecutive shows there (establishing themselves as a "New York rite of spring", according to biographer Alan Paul), which set the stage for their return nearly every year afterward. The band grew contentious over a 1993 tour, in which Betts was arrested when he shoved two police officers. Struggling to find a replacement guitarist, they brought in David Grissom (then touring with John Mellencamp), and also Jack Pearson, a Nashville-based friend of Haynes (the original replacement, Zakk Wylde, filled in for a show but his onstage antics did not fit with the band). Haynes was both opening with his own band and headlining with the Allman Brothers, and began to consider leaving the group, due to their increasing lack of communication.

Despite the growing tension, Haynes remained a member and Betts returned. Their third post-reunion record, Where It All Begins (1994), was recorded entirely live on a film soundstage (without an audience). "The Allman Brothers was a year-by-year thing. There was no indication that it was capable of staying together for years to come. We all looked at it as each tour could be the last one, and there was no reason to think otherwise," said Haynes. The band continued to tour with greater frequency, attracting younger generations with their headlining of the H.O.R.D.E. Festival. The group were inducted into the Rock and Roll Hall of Fame in January 1995; Allman was severely inebriated and could not make it through his acceptance speech. Seeing the ceremony broadcast on television later, Allman was mortified, providing a catalyst for his final, successful attempt to quit alcohol and substance abuse. During the 1996 run at the Beacon, turmoil came to a breaking point between Allman and Betts, nearly causing a cancellation of a show and causing another band breakup. "We were upstairs in our dressing rooms [...] I'm sitting there thinking, 'This is it. This is how it finally ends,'" said Trucks. Haynes and Woody left to focus on Gov't Mule, feeling as though a break was imminent with the Allman Brothers Band.

=== Later years (1997–2014) ===
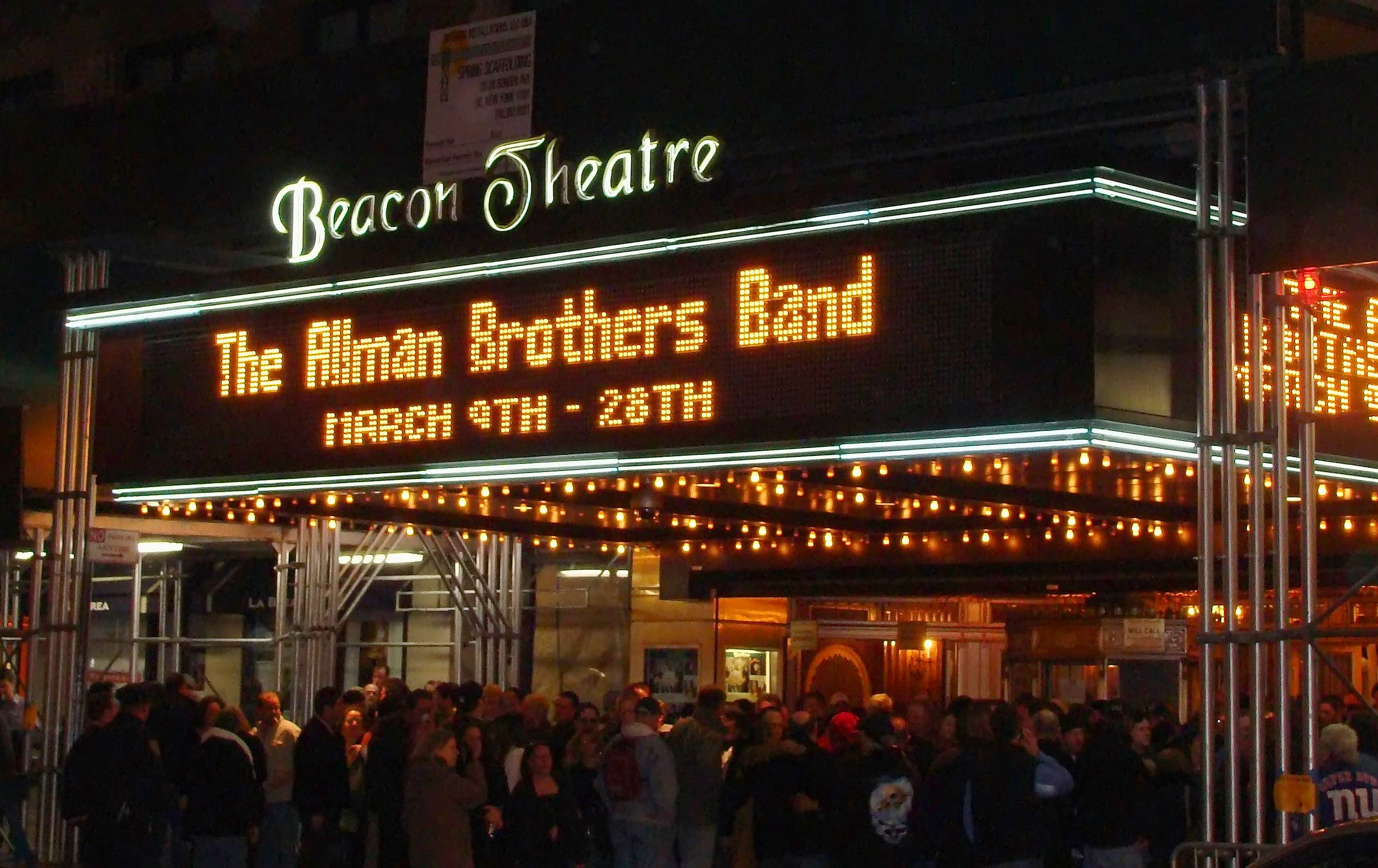
The band's 2009 residency at New York's Beacon Theatre was considered a career highlight.

The group recruited Oteil Burbridge of the Aquarium Rescue Unit to replace Woody on bass, and Jack Pearson on guitar. Concerns arose over the increasing loudness of Allman Brothers shows, which were largely centered on Betts. Pearson, struggling with tinnitus, left as a result following the 1999 Beacon run. Trucks phoned his nephew, Derek Trucks, to join the band for their thirtieth anniversary tour. Trucks was very young, at age 20, and younger than any of the original members when the band formed. "It was an honor to be part of such a great institution from the start," said Derek Trucks. "When I first got the gig, I was just trying to maintain the spirit of the whole thing while hopefully bringing some fire to it, hoping to hold up my end while also expressing my own voice." The Beacon run in 2000, captured on Peakin' at the Beacon, was ironically considered among the band's worst performances; an eight-show spring tour led to even more strained relations in the group. "It had ceased to be a band—everything had to be based around what Dickey was playing," said Allman. Anger boiled over within the group towards Betts, which led to all original members sending him a letter, informing him of their intentions to tour without him for the summer.

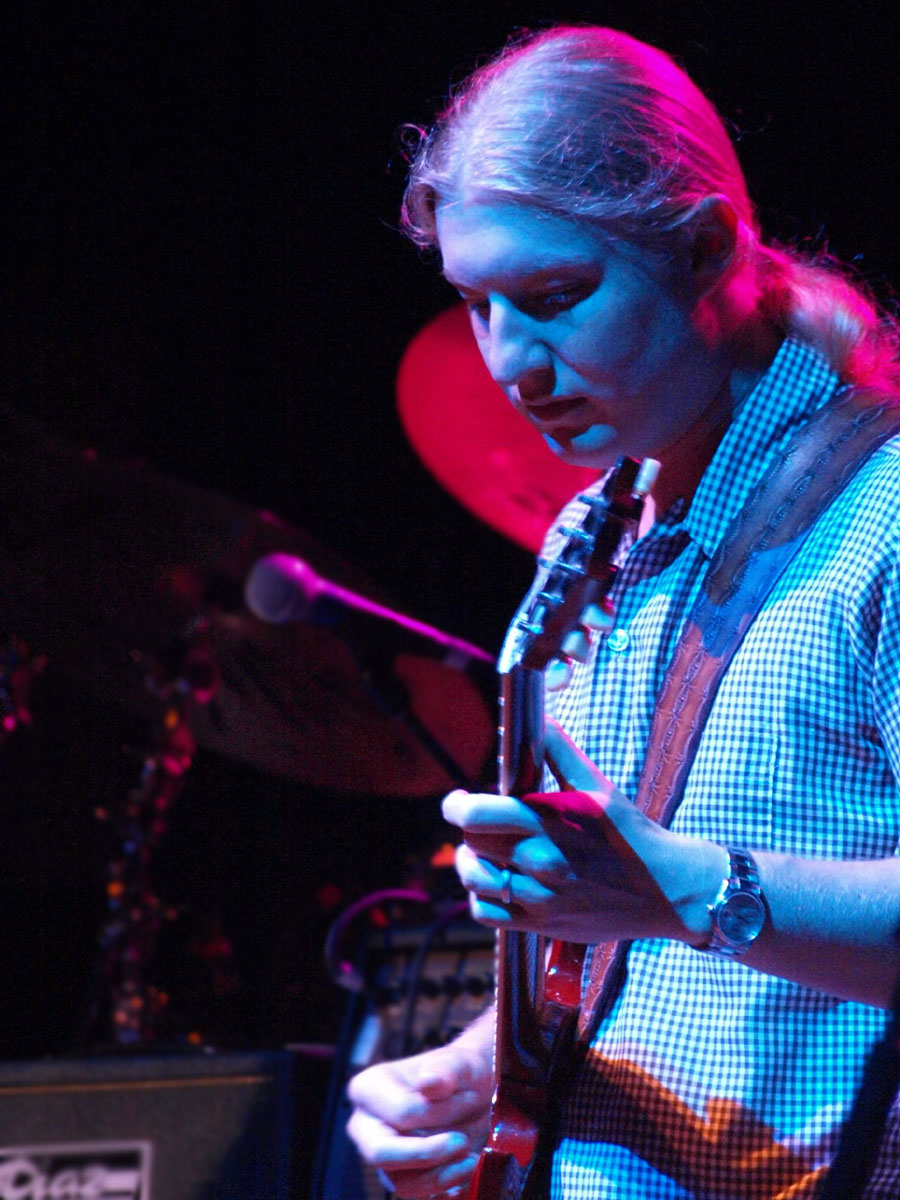
Derek Trucks joined in 1999 and became the band's youngest member.

All involved contend that the break was temporary, but Betts responded by hiring a lawyer and suing the group, which led to a permanent divorce. "I had no idea that I would be snapped out of the picture. I thought it was cruel and impersonal," said Betts. Allman was finally sober and felt that more miserable shows with Betts would be a waste of time. Betts later received a cash settlement, which is subject to a confidentiality agreement; he went on to record new music with a new band. Jimmy Herring joined the band for the summer tour, where the band fought negative press; fans contended that attending shows by an Allman Brothers Band without Betts was pointless. Herring exited shortly after the tour, as he felt guilty that he would replace Betts. That August, former bassist Allen Woody was found dead in a hotel room in New York. Warren Haynes set up a benefit show for his former bandmate, which featured the Allman Brothers Band. With Derek Trucks unavailable, he sat in for the set. In 2001, Haynes rejoined the band for their Beacon run: "It was my first time with the band in four years and it was very comfortable," he remarked.

This incarnation of the Allman Brothers Band was well-regarded among fans and the general public, and remained stable and productive. "This band is the greatest one since Duane and Berry, and why shouldn't it be?" said Jaimoe. The band released their final studio recording, Hittin' the Note (2003), to critical acclaim. The record was the first to feature Derek Trucks and the only Allman Brothers album to not feature Betts. The band continued to tour throughout the 2000s, remaining a top touring act, regularly attracting more than 20,000 fans. The decade closed with a successful run at the Beacon Theatre, in celebration of the band's fortieth anniversary. "That [2009 run] was the most fun I've ever had in that building," said Allman, and it was universally regarded within the band as a career highlight. The run featured numerous special guests, including Eric Clapton, whom all in the band regarded as the most "special" guest, due to his association with Duane. Allman had a liver transplant in 2010, and suffered health setbacks for the following two years. He went to rehab in 2012 for addiction following his medical treatments.

David "Frankie" Toler died at a hospice care in Bradenton, Florida on June 4, 2011, after a long illness following a liver transplant at the age of 59.

In 2012, the Allman Brothers started their own music festival, The Peach, which features many associated acts and many genres in addition to two Allman Brothers performances. They played a run at the Beacon in 2013 per tradition and after continued to tour. In 2014, Haynes and Derek Trucks announced their intention to depart the group at the end of the year. The group intended their 2014 run of Beacon shows to be their last, but the residency was cut short when Allman developed bronchitis. However, in September 2014, the group played the iconic At Fillmore East album at the Lockn' music festival in Arrington, Virginia.

In early 2014, Warren Haynes and Derek Trucks announced that they would be leaving the band at the end of the year and the group decided to retire from touring. Gregg Allman stated, "This is it—this is the end of it. Forty-five years is enough and I want to do something else anyway." The Allman Brothers Band performed its final show on October 28, 2014, at the Beacon Theatre. The show was the 238th straight sellout for the band at the Beacon. The concert consisted of three sets, comprising mostly music from their first five records, with no guest musicians sitting in. "We had a band meeting and decided no guest sit-ins. We're going out with just the band," Allman told reporters. Following the sets, which ran into the early morning hours, the band joined center stage and took a bow, with Allman recalling the group's first rehearsal 45 years prior: "I was called to come and meet these guys in Jacksonville, Florida, [...] on March 26, 1969. Now, we're gonna do the first song we ever played." Following this, the band performed "Trouble No More" by Muddy Waters. During the night's intermissions, a video screen displayed a message: "The road indeed goes on forever. So stay calm, eat a peach and carry on..."

=== Subsequent activities ===
In 2016, a band called Les Brers formed and toured the U.S. The group included former Allman Brothers Band members Butch Trucks, Jaimoe, Oteil Burbridge, Marc Quinones, and Jack Pearson, along with Pat Bergeson on guitar, Bruce Katz on keyboards, and Lamar Williams, Jr. (son of former ABB bassist Lamar Williams) on vocals.

In January 2017, Butch Trucks died from a self-inflicted gunshot wound at the age of 69. That May, Gregg Allman died from liver cancer at the age of 69.

In January 2020, the five surviving members of the final Allman Brothers lineup (Jaimoe, Oteil Burbridge, Marc Quinones, Warren Haynes, and Derek Trucks), calling themselves the Brothers, announced their intentions to hold a show to celebrate the 50th anniversary of the band on March 10 at Madison Square Garden. The concert lasted over four hours, with Duane Trucks taking the place of his uncle on drums, proto-Allmans member Reese Wynans taking the place of Gregg Allman on organ, and Warren Haynes taking on Gregg Allman's vocal parts. In addition pianist and past member Chuck Leavell joined the band for about half the numbers played. (Dickey Betts was invited to participate but his health precluded him from traveling although he wished the event be successful.) Like the final Beacon show, the Brothers 50 concert was dominated by material from the group's first five albums. The show was one of the last large concerts to take place before the 2020 coronavirus pandemic in North America forced the shutdown of such events; some people accordingly did not go to it, and indeed especially due to the older demographic of the group's fan base, Derek Trucks would subsequently wonder whether it had been wise to move forward with it.

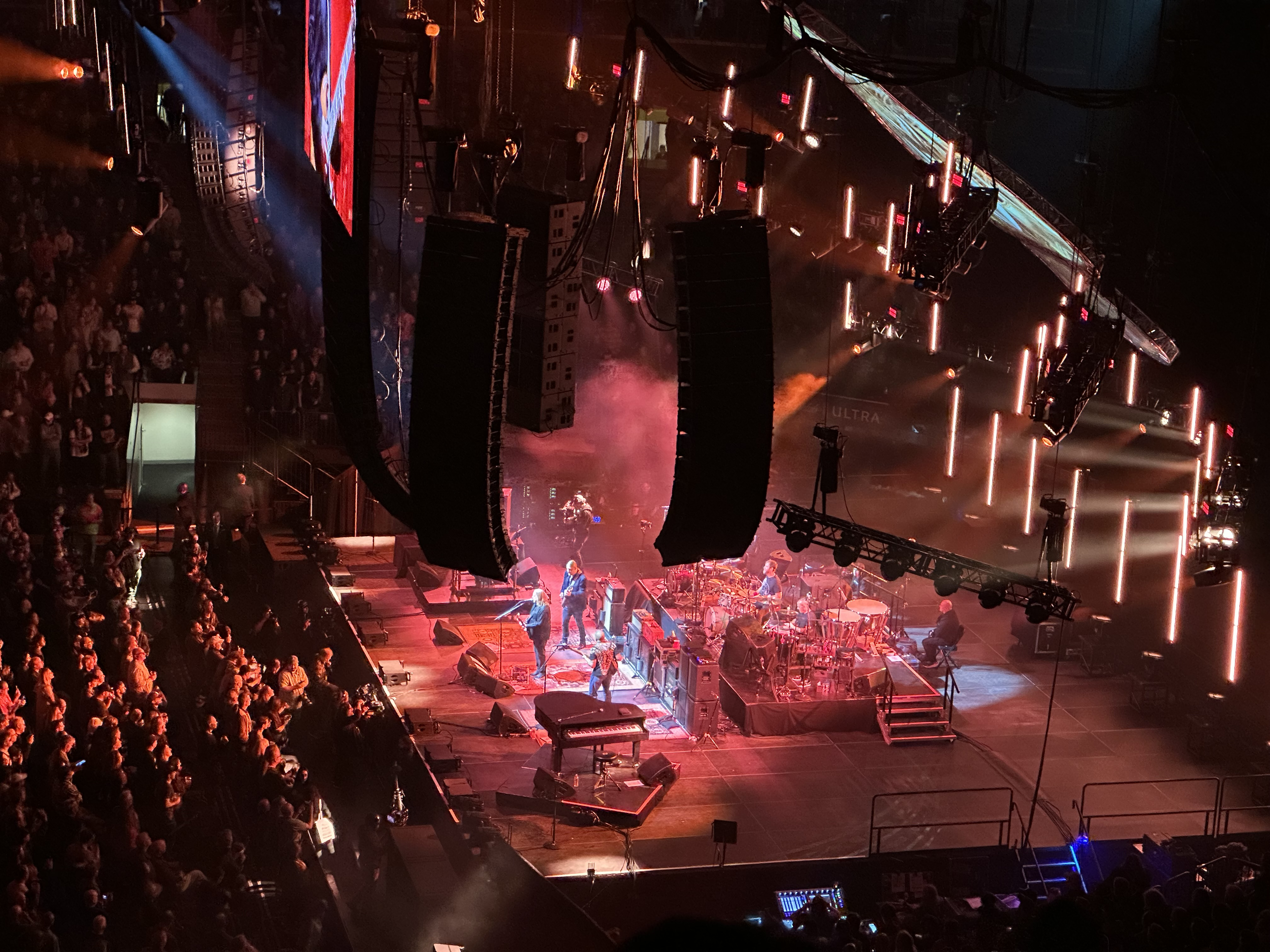
The Brothers performing "Done Somebody Wrong" at Madison Square Garden in 2025, with Warren Haynes taking on Gregg Allman's original lead vocal

On April 18, 2024, Dickey Betts died of cancer and chronic obstructive pulmonary disease at the age of 80, leaving Jaimoe as the last surviving original member of the Allman Brothers Band.

The Brothers formed again in April 2025, five years after the original show, for two appearances at Madison Square Garden. The lineup was the same as before, except that veteran musical collaborator Joe Russo filled the Butch Trucks drumming slot; in addition, Isaac Eady of the Tedeschi Trucks Band relieved Jaimoe at times. A review in Goldmine magazine agreed with the observation that, "Time passes, but these shows proved that the music of the Allman Brothers is timeless."

== Musical style and influences ==
"Whipping Post"
"Whipping Post" regularly exceeded 20 minutes at concerts, and was an example of the band's rhythm and blues influence.

"In Memory of Elizabeth Reed"
"In Memory of Elizabeth Reed" is an instrumental that showcases the band's strong emphasis on improvisation and jazz.

"Ramblin' Man"
"Ramblin' Man" was the group's biggest hit single, and considerably more country-inspired than other songs.

The Allman Brothers Band have generally been considered one of the pioneering bands in Southern rock, although the group distanced itself from the term. Guitarist Dickey Betts was most vocal about this classification, which he considered unfair: "I think it's limiting. I'd rather just be known as a progressive rock band from the South. I'm damned proud of who I am and where I'm from, but I hate the term 'Southern rock.' I think calling us that pigeonholed us and forced people to expect certain types of music from us that I don't think are fair." Gregg Allman also saw the "Southern rock" tag as redundant, saying it was like saying "rock rock" due to rock and roll being born in the South. The band was certainly at the forefront of the genre's popularity in the early 1970s; the breakthrough of At Fillmore East led their hometown of Macon to become flooded with "Southern rock" groups. Despite this, the group has continued to remove itself from the term. "The problem I have is a lot of people associate it with rednecks and rebel flags and backward mentality. That has never been representative of the Allman Brothers Band," said guitarist Warren Haynes.

The group largely infused hints of the blues, jazz, and country into their music. They all avidly shared their record collections with one another during the early days of the band. For example, Betts was into country music and the guitar work of Chuck Berry, while Trucks was largely into groups such as the Rolling Stones and the Grateful Dead. Duane and Gregg Allman grew infatuated with rhythm and blues in their teens, collecting records by James Brown, B.B. King, Sonny Boy Williamson, and Howlin' Wolf. The brothers were also heavily influenced by guitarist Taj Mahal and his 1968 eponymous debut album. It was this influence that led both to their discovery of their now famous slide guitar style. Drummer Jai Johanny "Jaimoe" Johanson largely introduced the group to jazz. While Betts commented that he was interested in artists such as Howard Roberts prior, Jaimoe "really fired us up on it," introducing his bandmates to Miles Davis and John Coltrane. Duane Allman was also inspired by Howard Roberts, Wes Montgomery, Tal Farlow, and Kenny Burrell. The source of the band's modal jamming in their earliest days was Coltrane's rendition of "My Favorite Things" and Davis' "All Blues", which Jaimoe occasionally stole from: "I did a lot of copying, but only from the best." This type of jazz-infused jamming is expressed in the instrumental "In Memory of Elizabeth Reed", which focuses heavily on improvisation. "Whipping Post" was notable for its inclusion of blues-ballad themes, and became one of the most popular (and longest) compositions. Later, Betts generally led the band in a more "country" direction following Duane's passing; their only hit single "Ramblin' Man" was considered so unusually "country" for the group that they were initially reluctant to record it.

Duane Allman had the idea of having two lead guitarists, which was inspired by Curtis Mayfield; "[he] wanted the bass, keyboards, and second guitar to form patterns behind the solo rather than just comping," said Allman. Their style and incorporation of guitar harmonies was very influential on later musicians. "The pair also had a wide range of complementary techniques, often forming intricate, interlocking patterns with each other and with the bassist, Berry Oakley, setting the stage for dramatic flights of improvised melodies." Dickey Betts' playing was very melody-based; "My style is just a little too smooth and round to play the blues stuff straight, because I'm such a melody guy that even when I'm playing the blues, I go for melody first," he said. His listening of country and string bluegrass growing up influenced this considerably: "I played mandolin, ukulele, and fiddle before I ever touched a guitar, which may be where a lot of the major keys I play come from." He later characterized their style as "question and answer, anticipation and conclusion," which involved allowing each musician's downbeat to arrive in a different spot, while also keeping consideration of the bass guitar lines.

The group also held an improvisational approach to live performances, which connected the band with jam band culture. "Jazz and blues musicians have been doing this for decades, but I think they really brought that sense that anyone onstage can inspire anyone else at any given time to rock music," said Haynes. "We sure didn't set out to be a "jam band" but those long jams just emanated from within the band, because we didn't want to just play three minutes and be over," said Allman. Rolling Stone referred to the group as "without question the first great jam band, and they took the jam to heights that it had not previously reached."

== Legacy ==
The Allman Brothers Band were considerably influential within the Southern United States. Their arrival on the musical scene paved the way for several other notable Southern rock bands—among those Lynyrd Skynyrd, the Marshall Tucker Band and Wet Willie—to achieve commercial success, and also "almost single-handedly" made Capricorn Records into "a major independent label". Billy Gibbons of ZZ Top, writing for Rolling Stone, wrote that the group "defined the best of every music from the American South in that time. They were the best of all of us." He went on to call the band "a true brotherhood of players—one that went beyond race and ego. It was a thing of beauty." The band's extended popularity through heavy touring in the early 1990s created a new generation of fans, one that viewed the Allmans as pioneers of "latter-day collegiate jam rock". AllMusic praised the band's history: "they went from being America's single most influential band to a shell of their former self trading on past glories, to reach the 21st century resurrected as one of the most respected rock acts of their era."

In 2012, an official historic marker was erected on the site of the July 1970 Second Atlanta International Pop Festival near Byron, Georgia. The Allman Brothers Band had played two sets at the festival, which was a significant event in their career. The marker text reads, in part: "Over thirty musical acts performed, including... Macon's Allman Brothers Band on their launching pad to national fame." Official sponsors of the marker included the Georgia Allman Brothers Band Association, The Allman Brothers Band Museum at the Big House, and Hittin' the Note. In 2003, the band released a recording of their festival opening and closing performances, Live at the Atlanta International Pop Festival: July 3 & 5, 1970.

In 2018, Devon Allman (son of Gregg Allman), Duane Betts (son of Dickey Betts), and Berry Duane Oakley (son of Berry Oakley) formed a band called the Allman Betts Band.

Written by author Alan Paul, Brothers and Sisters: The Allman Brothers Band and the Album That Defined the 70s was published by St. Martin's Press on July 25, 2023, celebrating the album of the same name's fiftieth anniversary. The book examines the making of the album while also presenting a broad cultural history of the era, covering stories of how the band rescued Jimmy Carter's flailing presidential campaign, Gregg Allman's marriage to Cher, and how the band's success led to an eventual breakup.

== Awards and recognition ==
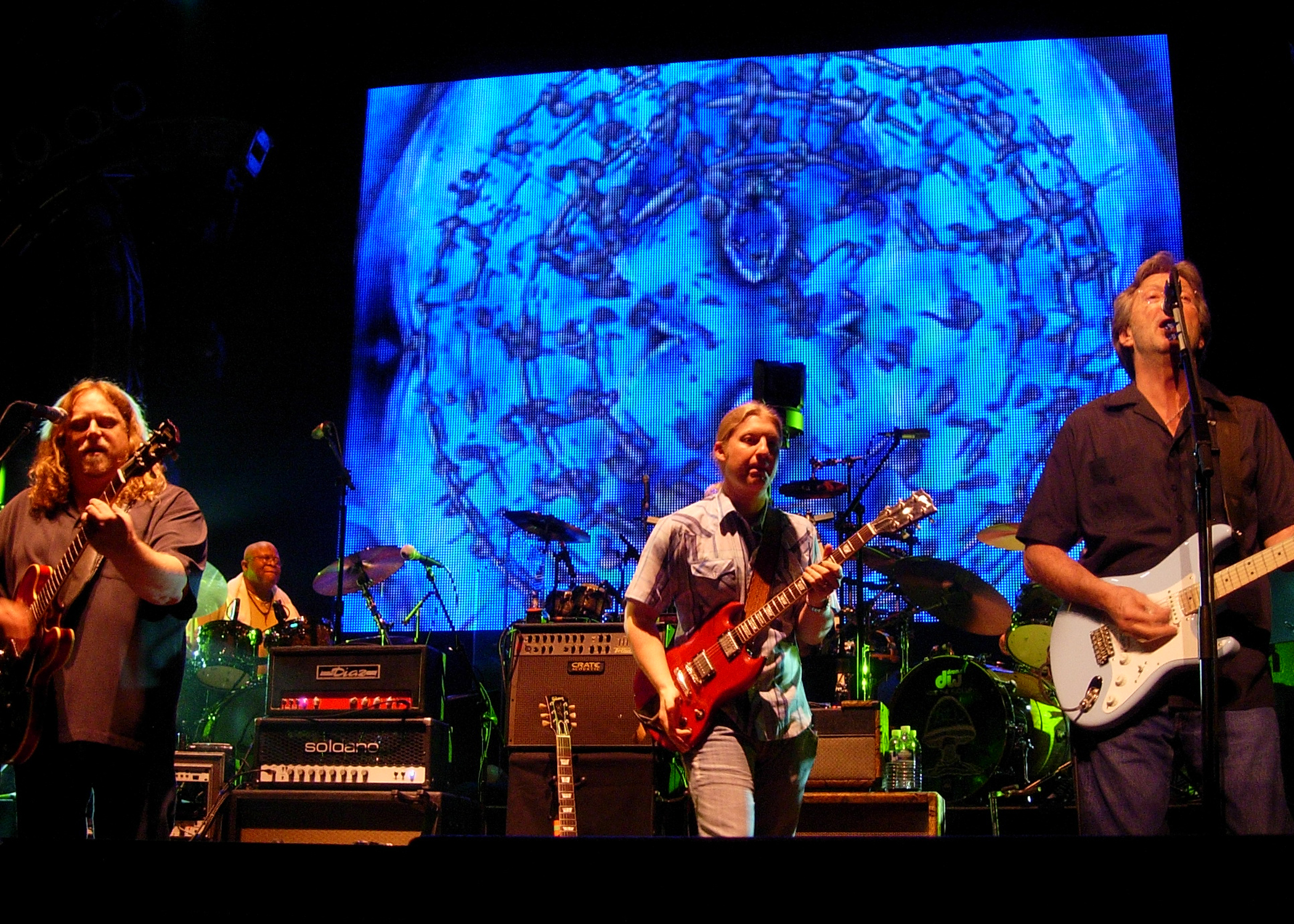
Guest appearances during the "Beacon Run" were common. Here Eric Clapton joins the band in March 2009 to play songs from 1970's Layla and Other Assorted Love Songs, which had featured Duane Allman.

- Grammy Award for Best Rock Instrumental Performance, 1996, "Jessica" (also famous for being the theme for the TV series Top Gear).
- Grammy Lifetime Achievement Award, 2012
- Inducted into the Rock and Roll Hall of Fame, 1995
- Rolling Stone's "Greatest...of All Time" lists:
  - 100 Greatest Artists of All Time (2004): No. 52
  - 500 Greatest Albums of All Time (2003): No. 49 for At Fillmore East
  - 500 Greatest Albums of All Time (2020): No. 105 for At Fillmore East
  - 100 Greatest Guitarists of All Time (2003):
    - No. 2 Duane Allman
    - No. 23 Warren Haynes
    - No. 58 Dickey Betts
    - No. 81 Derek Trucks
  - 100 Greatest Guitarists of All Time (2011):
    - No. 9 Duane Allman
    - No. 16 Derek Trucks
    - No. 61 Dickey Betts
  - 250 Greatest Guitarists of All Time (2023):
    - No. 10 Duane Allman
    - No. 80 Derek Trucks
    - No. 120 Warren Haynes
    - No. 145 Dickey Betts

== Personnel ==
- Duane Allman – lead and slide guitar (1969–1971)
- Gregg Allman – organ, piano, occasional guitar, vocals (1969–1976, 1978–1982, 1989–2014)
- Dickey Betts – lead and slide guitar, vocals (1969–1976, 1978–1982, 1989–2000)
- Berry Oakley – bass, backing and occasional lead vocals (1969–1972)
- Jai Johanny "Jaimoe" Johanson – drums, percussion (1969–1976, 1978–1980, 1989–2014)
- Butch Trucks – drums, timpani (1969–1976, 1978–1982, 1989–2014)
- Chuck Leavell – piano, backing vocals (1972–1976)
- Lamar Williams – bass (1972–1976)
- Dan Toler – lead guitar (1978–1982)
- David Goldflies – bass (1978–1982)
- Mike Lawler – piano, synthesizers, clavinet (1980–1982)
- Frankie Toler – drums (1980–1982)
- Warren Haynes – lead and slide guitar (1989–1997, 2001–2014)
- Allen Woody – bass (1989–1997)
- Johnny Neel – piano, synthesizers, harmonica (1989 – 1990)
- Marc Quiñones – percussion, backing vocals (1991–2014)
- Oteil Burbridge – bass, backing and occasional lead vocals (1997–2014)
- Jack Pearson – lead and slide guitar (1997–1999)
- Derek Trucks – lead and slide guitar (1999–2014)
- Jimmy Herring – lead and slide guitar (2000)

=== Timeline ===
The Allman Brothers Band were together from 1969 to 1976, from 1978 to 1982, and from 1989 to 2014. The timeline below documents the first of these three incarnations.

== Discography ==
The Allman Brothers Band placed more emphasis on their live performances rather than albums. "We get kind of frustrated doing the [studio] records," said Duane Allman in 1970. Consequently, this listing includes all studio albums and contemporary live albums. (Other live releases have been issued retrospectively).

- The Allman Brothers Band (1969)
- Idlewild South (1970)
- At Fillmore East (1971, live)
- Eat a Peach (1972, part live)
- Brothers and Sisters (1973)
- Win, Lose or Draw (1975)
- Wipe the Windows, Check the Oil, Dollar Gas (1976, live)
- Enlightened Rogues (1979)
- Reach for the Sky (1980)
- Brothers of the Road (1981)
- Seven Turns (1990)
- Shades of Two Worlds (1991)
- An Evening with the Allman Brothers Band: First Set (1992, live)
- Where It All Begins (1994)
- An Evening with the Allman Brothers Band: 2nd Set (1995, live)
- Peakin' at the Beacon (2000, live)
- Hittin' the Note (2003)
- One Way Out (2004, live)

== See also ==
- The Peach Music Festival
- Wanee Music Festival
