= Dan Toler =

- Also known as: Dangerous Dan
- Born: Daniel Lee Toler; September 23, 1948; Connersville, Indiana, U.S.
- Died: February 25, 2013 (aged 64) Sarasota, Florida, U.S.
- Occupation: Guitarist
- Instrument: Guitar
- Years active: 1971–2013

Daniel Lee Toler (September 23, 1948 – February 25, 2013), known professionally as "Dangerous" Dan Toler, was an American guitarist.

== Life and career ==
A native of Connersville, Indiana, Toler became popular in the late 1970s as a member of Dickey Betts & Great Southern. He was featured on the albums Dickey Betts & Great Southern and Atlanta's Burning Down. He went on to become a member of The Allman Brothers Band with Betts from 1979 to 1982, appearing on Enlightened Rogues (1979), Reach for the Sky (1980) and Brothers of the Road (1981).

Toler and his brother David (Frankie) Toler were members of the Gregg Allman Band in the 1980s. They performed on the albums I'm No Angel (1987) and Just Before The Bullets Fly (1988), as well as a reformed version of Great Southern in the 2000s. Prior to rejoining Great Southern, Toler had not spoken to Betts in over 10 years. Dan experimented with jazz fusion multi-instrumentalist Mark Pettey in Sarasota in the early 1990s, recording a short demo, and performing live shows in the Tampa Bay area. Mark and Dan continued to collaborate on jazz influenced projects together.

Toler, John Townsend, Toler's brother David (Frankie) Toler, Bruce Waibel and Mark Pettey created the Townsend Toler Band in the early 1990s, starting with a demo cut in Telstar Studios in Sarasota. This was followed by tours of the eastern United States, including shows in New York City and up and down the east coast. He later joined The Renegades of Southern Rock, whose members included George McCorkle (formerly of The Marshall Tucker Band), John Townsend (Sanford-Townsend Band), John McKnight, Jack Hall (Wet Willie), and Taylor Caldwell.

In 2007 Toler performed on Jason Black's Mind Over Matter album. Two years later, Toler once again teamed up with John Townsend to form the Toler/Townsend Band. Their self-titled album was released in 2009 on the European Blues Boulevard/music avenue label. The Toler/Townsend Band CD was later released in the United States by Garage Door Records.

In 2011, Toler formed the Toler–Tucci Band, which was scheduled to release its debut album, Doc's Hideaway, in August 2012. Verceal Whitaker of The Platters was the featured vocalist on that project.

== Personal life ==
Toler had battled amyotrophic lateral sclerosis (ALS) and died in Sarasota, Florida on February 25, 2013. He was 64.
