= Final Concert 10-28-14 =

Live album by the Allman Brothers Band

Live album by The Allman Brothers Band
- Released: October 25, 2024
- Recorded: October 28, 2014
- Venue: Beacon Theatre
- Genres: Blues rock, Southern rock
- Label: Peach Records
- Producer: Allman Brothers Band

The Allman Brothers Band chronology
Manley Field House, Syracuse University, April 7, 1972 (2024)	Final Concert 10-28-14 (2024)

Final Concert 10-28-14 is a live album by the rock group the Allman Brothers Band. It contains the complete concert recorded on October 28, 2014, at the Beacon Theatre in New York City. It was released for streaming and as a digital download on October 25, 2024, and as a three-disc CD on November 22, 2024.

As the title suggests, the album documents the last concert by the Allman Brothers Band, which formed in 1969. Early in 2014 they announced that they would disband before the end of the year. From October 21 to October 28 they performed a final run of six concerts at the Beacon Theatre. For the last show, they played an extended performance of three sets, with most of the songs selected from their first five albums.

== Critical reception ==
In Goldmine magazine, Ray Chelstowski wrote, "What becomes clear quickly is how well-recorded this session was.... In some ways you might argue that it’s a reflection of how far the group had come artistically and within the specific realm of their own instruments. It’s pretty much a master class on getting after a groove and riding it all the way home."

On Best Classic Bands, Jeff burger said, "But that blistering, three-and-a-half-hour performance demonstrated that the group could still kick up a storm onstage in 2014.... The album of the concert offers a generous sampler of the innovative, jazz-influenced music that had made the Allmans the kings of Southern rock."

On Louder, Hugh Fielder wrote, "Haynes and Trucks effortlessly recreate the searing guitar lines that Duane Allman and Dickey Betts made the cornerstone of the band's sound. The other elements, like the dual drummer plus percussionist that kept up a rolling thunder behind the guitars and Gregg Allman's plaintive keyboards and vocals, are still intact."

== Track listing ==
Disc 1

First set:

1. "Little Martha" (Duane Allman) – 0:52
2. "Mountain Jam" (Donovan Leitch, Duane Allman, Gregg Allman, Dickey Betts, Jai Johanny Johanson, Berry Oakley, Butch Trucks) – 4:00
3. "Don't Want You No More" (Spencer Davis, Edward Hardin) – 2:35
4. "It's Not My Cross to Bear" (G. Allman) – 5:04
5. "One Way Out" (Elmore James, Marshall Sehorn) – 6:26
6. "Good Morning Little School Girl" (Sonny Boy Williamson) – 10:54
7. "Midnight Rider" (G. Allman, Robert Kim Payne) – 3:35
8. "The High Cost of Low Living" (G. Allman, Warren Haynes, Jeff Anders, Ronnie Burgin) – 8:39
9. "Hot 'Lanta" (D. Allman, G. Allman, Betts, Johanson, Oakley, Trucks) – 5:39
10. "Blue Sky" (Betts) – 9:54
11. "You Don't Love Me" / "Soul Serenade" / "You Don't Love Me" (Willie Cobbs / Curtis Ousley, Luther Dixon / Cobbs) – 13:31

Disc 2

Second set:

1. "Statesboro Blues" (Will McTell) – 4:52
2. "Ain't Wastin' Time No More" (G. Allman) – 7:44
3. "Black Hearted Woman" (G. Allman) – 13:05
4. "The Sky Is Crying" (James) – 9:12
5. "Dreams" (G. Allman) – 11:41
6. "Don't Keep Me Wonderin'" (G. Allman) – 4:32
7. "In Memory of Elizabeth Reed" (Betts) – 15:29
8. "JaMaBuBu" (Jaimoe, Trucks, Marc Quiñones, Oteil Burbridge) – 10:27
9. "In Memory of Elizabeth Reed" (reprise) (Betts) – 2:29

Disc 3

Third set:

1. "Melissa" (G. Allman) – 5:40
2. "Revival" (Betts) – 4:31
3. "Southbound" (Betts) – 5:16
4. "Mountain Jam" (continued) (Leitch, D. Allman, G. Allman, Betts, Johanson, Oakley, Trucks) – 8:52
5. "Will the Circle Be Unbroken" (traditional, arranged by G. Allman and Johnny Sandlin) – 6:15
6. "Mountain Jam" (reprise) (Leitch, D. Allman, G. Allman, Betts, Johanson, Oakley, Trucks) – 11:12
7. "Whipping Post" (G. Allman) – 16:18
8. Farewell speeches – 3:33
9. "Trouble No More" (McKinley Morganfield) – 4:30

== Personnel ==
The Allman Brothers Band

- Gregg Allman – Hammond B-3 organ, piano, acoustic guitar, vocals
- Butch Trucks – drums, tympani
- Jaimoe – drums
- Warren Haynes – lead and slide guitar, vocals
- Derek Trucks – lead and slide guitar
- Oteil Burbridge – bass, vocals
- Marc Quiñones – congas, percussion, vocals

Production

- Produced by Allman Brothers Band
- Executive producer: Bert Holman
- Project supervision: Bill Levenson, John Lynskey, Kirk West
- Liner notes: John Lynskey
- Mastering: Jason NeSmith
- Package design: Derek McCabe
- Photos: Kirk West, Derek McCabe
- Recording: Munck Music
- Live audio engineering: Bruce "Slim" Judd
- Recording engineer: Christian Gero
