= Cream of the Crop 2003 =

Live album by The Allman Brothers Band
- Released: June 15, 2018
- Recorded: July 25 – August 10, 2003
- Genres: Southern rock, blues rock
- Length: 314:23
- Label: Peach Records
- Producer: The Allman Brothers Band

The Allman Brothers Band chronology
The Fox Box (2017)	Cream of the Crop 2003 (2018)	Fillmore West '71 (2019)

Cream of the Crop 2003 is a four-CD live album by the Allman Brothers Band. It was recorded from July 25 to August 10, 2003 at six different concert venues. It was released on June 15, 2018.

Cream of the Crop 2003 features the 2001 to 2014 lineup of the Allman Brothers Band – Gregg Allman on keyboards and vocals, Warren Haynes on guitar and vocals, Derek Trucks on guitar, Oteil Burbridge on bass, Butch Trucks on drums, Jai Johanny Johanson on drums, and Marc Quiñones on percussion.

== Highlights LP ==
Cream of the Crop 2003: Highlights is a three-LP edition of 16 songs selected from the four-CD album. It was released on gold, silver, and red vinyl on April 23, 2022, as part of Record Store Day.

== Critical reception ==
In the Sarasota Herald-Tribune, Wade Tatengelo wrote, "Recorded during the same exciting period resulting in the acclaimed One Way Out double live album, Cream Of The Crop is now probably the best representation of the Allman Brothers' 2001 to 2014 lineup... It's 36 songs with no repeats clocking in at over five hours."

In Relix, Alan Paul said, "The Allman Brothers Band only recorded one studio album, 2003's Hittin' the Note, during their final lineup’s 13-year run. That's a shame for many reasons, not least of which is that, as their new archival release Cream of the Crop 2003 quickly demonstrates, the group came alive when they had some new material.... Avoiding any song repeats, the collection has the flow of a show, thanks to excellent selection and sequencing by supervising producer Warren Haynes."

Larson Sutton of Jambands.com stated: "this was a unit still very fresh to one another, rapidly evolving the telepathy that made an Allman Brothers Band concert a near-religious experience for so many. As a suitably representative statement from this sizzling summer, Cream of the Crop 2003 is a certified grade-A collection."

Writing for Glide Magazine, Doug Collette commented: "the Allman Brothers Band was never much for cosmetic appearances, so what's at the heart of Cream of the Crop 2003, certifiably brilliant musicianship, ends up making a very convincing argument this ABB unit was comparable to, though not quite the equal of, that original ensemble that recorded At Fillmore East."

== Track listing ==
Disc one

1. "Don't Want You No More" (Spencer Davis, Edward Hardin) – 2:49
2. "It's Not My Cross to Bear" (Gregg Allman) – 4:55
3. "Black Hearted Woman" (G. Allman) – 6:49
4. "Rocking Horse" (G. Allman, Warren Haynes, Allen Woody, Jack Pearson) – 8:45
5. "Hot 'Lanta" (G. Allman, Duane Allman, Dickey Betts, Butch Trucks, Berry Oakley, Jai Johanny Johanson) – 5:22
6. "Old Before My Time" (G. Allman, Haynes) – 5:35
7. "Come and Go Blues" (G. Allman) – 5:57
8. "Woman Across the River" (Bettye Crutcher, Allen Jones) – 6:58
9. "Desdemona" (G. Allman, Haynes) – 8:34
10. "The High Cost of Low Living" (G. Allman, Haynes, Jeff Anders, Ronnie Burgin) – 9:53
11. "Hoochie Coochie Man" (Willie Dixon) – 9:13
12. "Revival" (Betts) – 4:10

Disc two

1. "Trouble No More" (McKinley Morganfield) – 3:34
2. "Midnight Rider" (G. Allman, Robert Payne) – 3:19
3. "You Don't Love Me" (Willie Cobbs) – 9:46
4. "Who to Believe" (Haynes, John Jaworowicz) – 7:05
5. "Stormy Monday" (T-Bone Walker) – 11:23
6. "Good Morning Little Schoolgirl" (Sonny Boy Williamson I) – 10:31
7. "In Memory of Elizabeth Reed" (Betts) – 33:25

Disc three

1. "Ain't Wastin' Time No More" (G. Allman) – 6:32
2. "Worried Down with the Blues" (Haynes, Woody, Jaworowicz) – 7:41
3. "Statesboro Blues" (Will McTell) – 5:24
4. "Stand Back" (G. Allman, Oakley) – 5:26
5. "Melissa" (G. Allman) – 5:42
6. "Mountain Jam" (Donovan Leitch, G. Allman, D. Allman, Betts, Trucks, Oakley, Johanson) – 40:19
7. "Layla" (Eric Clapton, Jim Gordon) – 7:25

Disc four

1. "Don't Keep Me Wonderin'" (G. Allman) – 3:58
2. "Done Somebody Wrong" (Clarence L. Lewis, Elmore James, Morris Levy) – 3:49
3. "Gambler's Roll" (Haynes, Johnny Neel) – 6:50
4. "Soulshine" (Haynes) – 7:06
5. "Who's Been Talking" (Chester Burnett) – 9:33
6. "Don't Think Twice, It's All Right" (Bob Dylan) – 5:27
7. "Wasted Words" (G. Allman) – 7:19
8. "Dreams" (G. Allman) – 12:32
9. "Whipping Post" (G. Allman) – 14:17
10. "One Way Out" (James, Marshall Sehorn, Sonny Boy Williamson II) – 6:52

Recording dates

- July 25, 2003 – Murat Center, Indianapolis, Indiana
- July 26, 2003 – Post-Gazette Pavilion, Burgettstown, Pennsylvania
- August 2, 2003 – Darien Lake Performing Arts Center, Darien, New York
- August 3, 2003 – Meadows Music Center, Hartford, Connecticut
- August 9, 2003 – Verizon Wireless Amphitheatre, Charlotte, North Carolina
- August 10, 2003 – Alltel Pavilion, Raleigh, North Carolina

== Personnel ==
The Allman Brothers Band

- Gregg Allman – Hammond B-3 organ, piano, vocals
- Warren Haynes – lead and slide guitar, vocals
- Derek Trucks – lead and slide guitar
- Oteil Burbridge – bass
- Butch Trucks – drums
- Jaimoe – drums
- Marc Quiñones – congas, percussion, vocals

Additional musicians

- Karl Denson – saxophone on "Good Morning Little Schoolgirl"
- Susan Tedeschi – vocals on "Don't Think Twice, It's All Right"
- Branford Marsalis – saxophone on "Dreams", "Whipping Post"

Production

- Produced by the Allman Brothers Band
- Supervising producer: Warren Haynes
- Executive producer: Bert Holman
- Associate producers: Bill Levenson, John Lynskey
- Mastering: Tom Lewis
- Mixing: Bruce "Slim" Judd
- Package design: Terry Bradley
- Liner notes essay: John Lynskey
