= The Allman Brothers Band Museum =

Museum in Macon, Georgia, US

Coordinates: 32°50′45.63″N 83°39′21.15″W

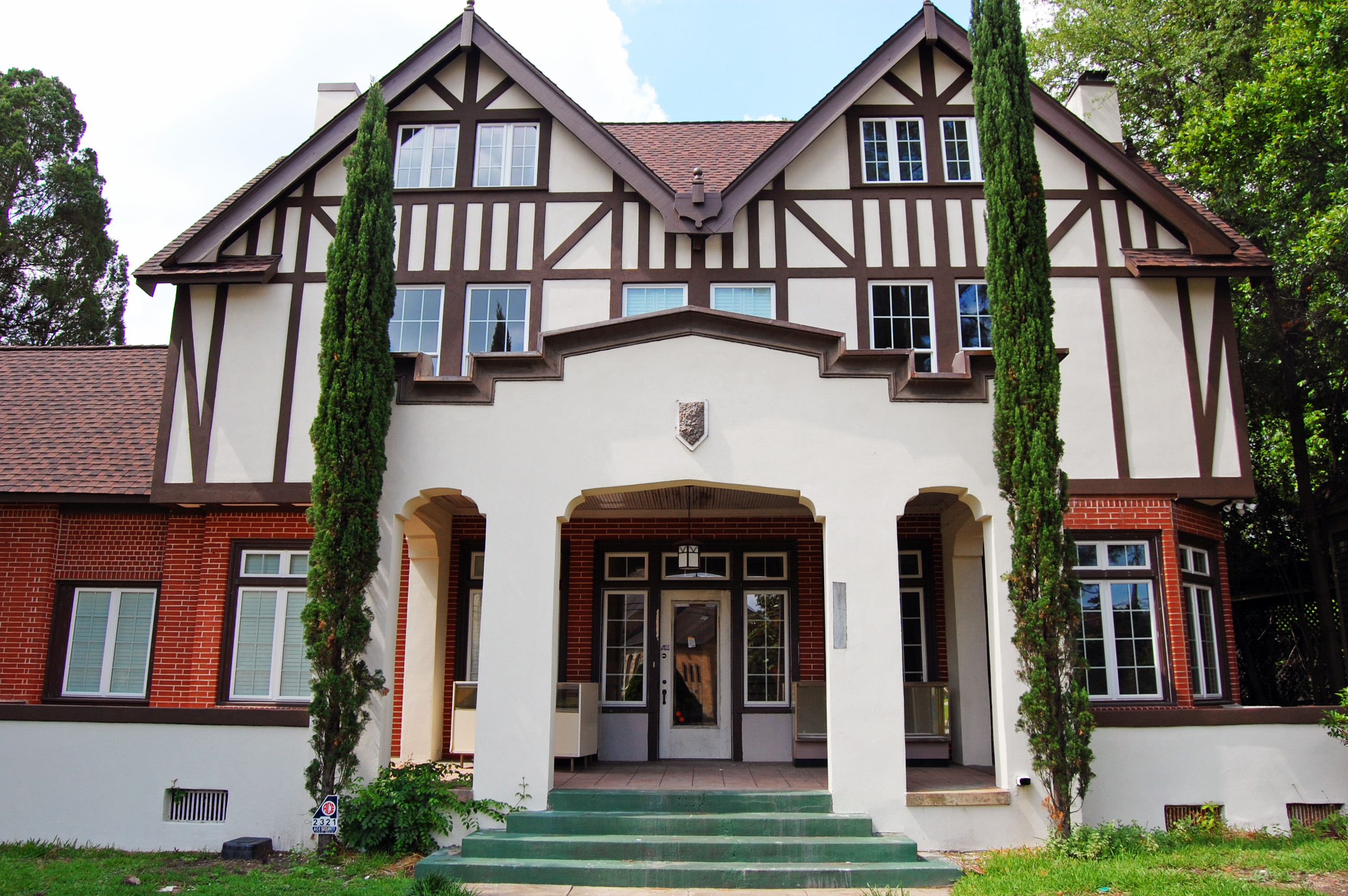
The Big House, 2009

The Allman Brothers Band Museum, also known as The Big House, is a museum in Macon, Georgia, United States. It was the home to The Allman Brothers Band's original members, their families, and various friends from 1970 to 1973. The Big House was renovated by The Big House Foundation and opened in November 2009 as an interactive museum dedicated to identifying and preserving the history of The Allman Brothers Band.

== History ==
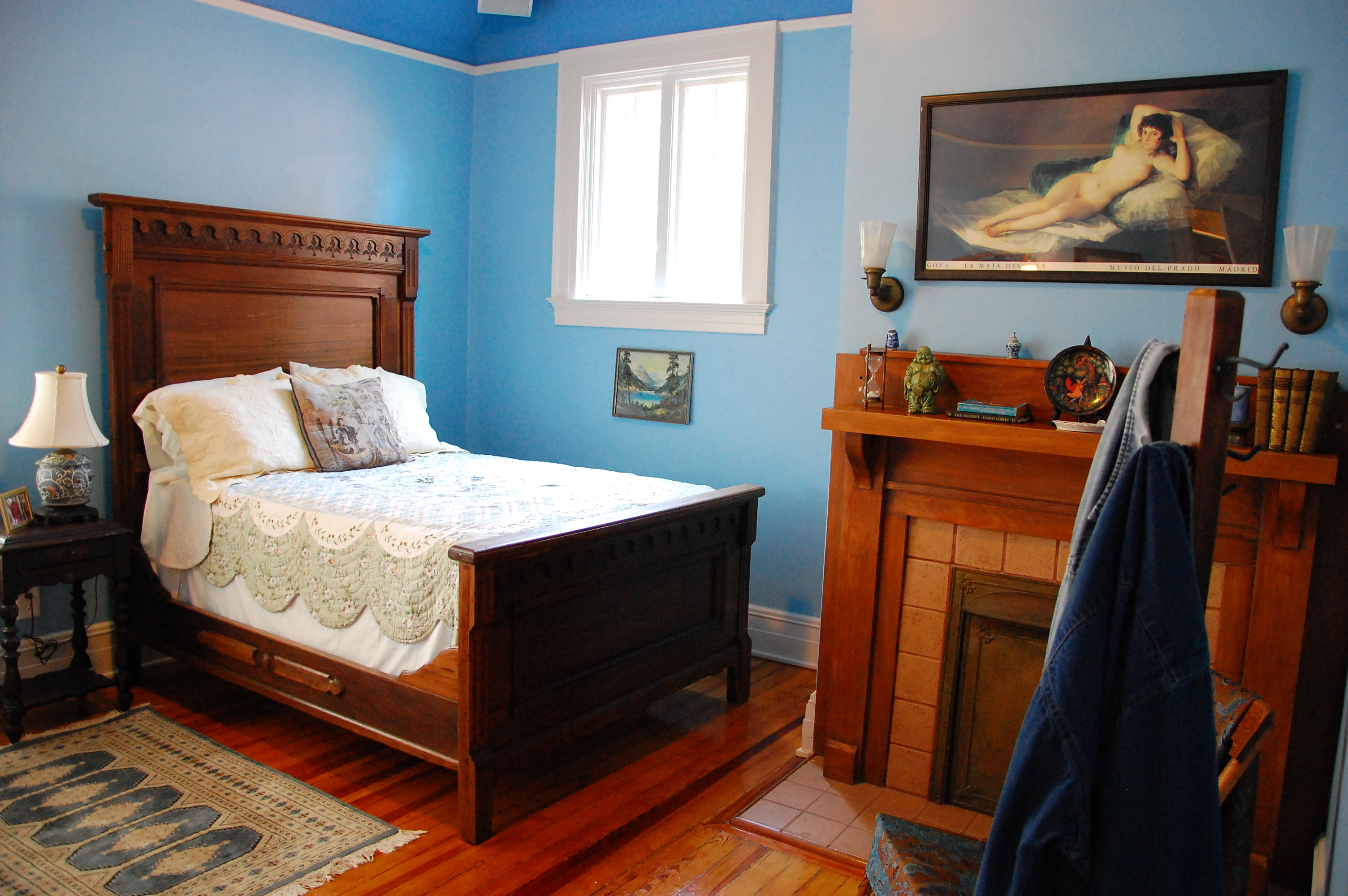
Duane Allman's bedroom in 2010, decorated similarly to the way it was in 1970 (by Linda Oakley, then and now)

In 1970 The Big House was rented from Day Realty for $225 a month by Linda Oakley, Berry Oakley's wife. The house is near Capricorn Records, which was The Allman Brothers recording studio. Also near the house is H&H Restaurant, where the musicians were fed by Mama Louise when they could not afford to pay for food. The first tenants of the 18-room, 4,440-square-foot (412 m^{2}) home were Berry Oakley, his wife Linda, their daughter Brittany, Berry Oakley's sister Candy Oakley, Duane Allman, his wife Donna, their daughter Galadrielle, and Gregg Allman. Dickey Betts wrote "Blue Sky" in the living room and "Ramblin' Man" in the kitchen of the Big House. "Please Call Home", "Ain't Wastin' Time No More", "Leave My Blues at Home" and "Midnight Rider" were also composed by Gregg Allman while living there. After the deaths of Duane Allman and Berry Oakley, the band fell apart and in January 1973, Linda Oakley was evicted from the Big House. Kirk and Kristen West bought the house in the summer of 1993 with intentions to open it as a bed and breakfast; however, the needed renovations were too extensive. The house was left in the hands of the Big House Foundation, a non-profit organization established to turn the Big House into an interactive museum.

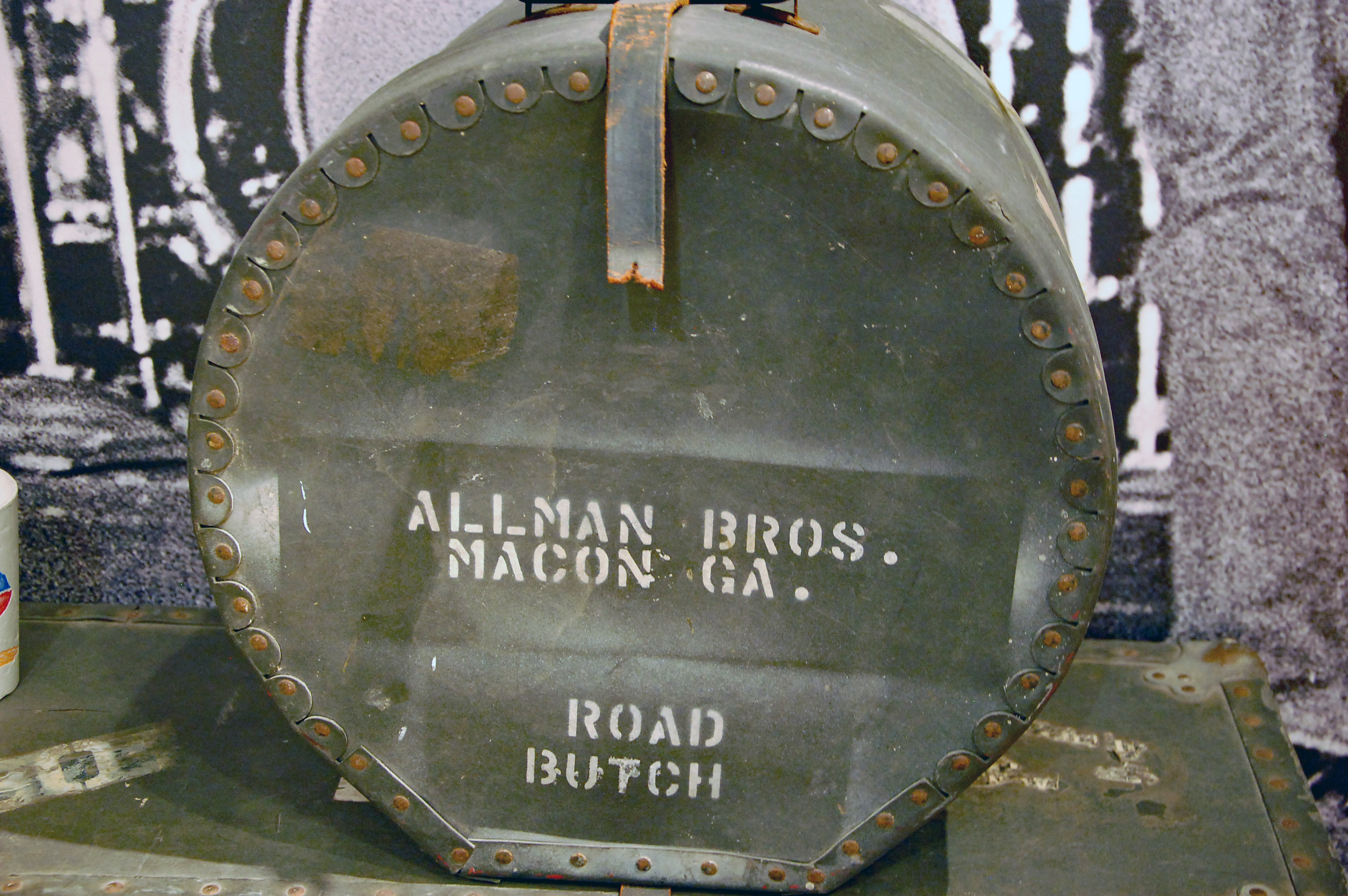
Butch Trucks' drum case on display

The Big House contains the world's largest collection of The Allman Brothers Band memorabilia.

== See also ==
- List of music museums
