= Ramblin' Man (The Allman Brothers Band song) =

Single by The Allman Brothers Band

Single by the Allman Brothers Band

from the album Brothers and Sisters
- B-side: "Pony Boy"
- Released: August 1973
- Recorded: October 1972
- Genre: Country rock; Southern rock; pop rock
- Length: 4:48
- Label: Capricorn
- Songwriter: Dickey Betts
- Producers: Johnny Sandlin; the Allman Brothers

The Allman Brothers Band singles chronology
"One Way Out" (1972)	"Ramblin' Man" (1973)	"Jessica" (1973)

Official video
- "Ramblin' Man" on YouTube

"Ramblin' Man" is a song by rock band the Allman Brothers Band, released in August 1973 as the lead single from the group's fourth studio album, Brothers and Sisters (1973). Written and sung by the band's guitarist, Dickey Betts, it was inspired by a 1951 song of the same name by Hank Williams. It is much more grounded in country music than other Allman Brothers Band compositions, which made the group reluctant to record it. Guitarist Les Dudek provides guitar harmonies, and it was one of bassist Berry Oakley's last contributions to the band.

The song became the Allman Brothers Band's first and only top 10 single, peaking at number two on the Billboard Hot 100 chart, behind "Half-Breed" by Cher, (whom Gregg Allman would later marry). It also reached number 12 on the Easy Listening chart.

== Background ==
"Ramblin' Man" was first created during songwriting sessions for Eat a Peach. An embryonic version, referring to a "ramblin' country man," can be heard on the bootleg The Gatlinburg Tapes, featuring the band jamming on an off-day in April 1971 in Gatlinburg, Tennessee. Betts continued to work on the song for a year, but the lyrics came together in as little as twenty minutes. "I wrote "Ramblin' Man" in Berry Oakley's kitchen [at the Big House] at about four in the morning. Everyone had gone to bed but I was sitting up," said Betts in 2014. Drummer Butch Trucks noted that the band acknowledged it was a good song but were reluctant to record it, as it sounded too country for them. New member and keyboardist Chuck Leavell enjoyed the song, noting, "It's definitely in the direction of country but that didn't bother me in the least [...] I think our attitude was, 'Let's take this thing and make it as great as we can.'" The song was inspired by Hank Williams' 1951 recording of his own composition Ramblin' Man.

It was one of the first songs recorded for Brothers and Sisters (1973), alongside "Wasted Words". The band went to the studio to record a song demo to send to a friend, where the extended guitar soloing near the song's finale was created. Having not considered it an Allman Brothers song before, they felt the embellishment fitted the band well and decided to put the song on the album. Guitarist Les Dudek, who was contributing to Brothers and Sisters, was sitting in the control room when the song was being recorded. He and Betts had worked out the harmony parts together. Betts continued approaching him for his thoughts on the recordings. Eventually, he asked him to record the song with him. "We played it all live. I was standing where Duane would have stood with Berry just staring a hole through me and that was very intense and very heavy," said Dudek. When the song was completed, the management team and road crew gathered to listen to it. According to Dudek, the room was silent after it ended, and roadie Red Dog remarked, "That's the best I heard since Duane."

Johnny Sandlin, producer of Brothers and Sisters, remarked that he thought it was "crazy" to be released as a single because "nothing else sounds remotely similar, with the possible exception of 'Blue Sky,' which had a similar, upbeat major-key bounce."

== Composition ==
The song is in common time, with a tempo of 182 beats per minute, and is in the key of A-flat major. Betts's vocals range from the low note of Ab_{3} to the high note of Gb_{4}.

Some versions of the song for single and radio promo releases have the recording slowed down and remixed. The radio promo version was edited a minute shorter than the album version.

== Reception ==
Capricorn executives were split between issuing "Wasted Words" or "Ramblin' Man" as the lead single. National promotion director, Dick Wooley, sent advance tapes of "Ramblin' Man" to WQXI-AM in Atlanta and WRKO-AM in Boston radio stations and "listener phone-in reaction was near-phenomenal." "Ramblin' Man" broke hard rock barriers and became a hit on AM stations nationwide, rising to number two on the Billboard Hot 100.

AllMusic writes that "the chorus is perhaps the catchiest and prettiest hook in all of Southern rock". Robert Christgau called the tune "miraculous".

In June 2026, CBS News included the song in its list of the 250 essential American songs of the past 250 years.

== Charts ==
Chart (1973–1974)	Peak position
Australia (Go-Set)	40
Canadian RPM Adult Contemporary	15
Canadian RPM Top Singles	7
Canadian RPM Country Playlist	90
US Billboard Hot 100	2
US Easy Listening (Billboard)	12
US Cash Box Top 100	1

== Notes ==
=== Sources ===
- Paul, Alan (2014). One Way Out: The Inside History of the Allman Brothers Band. St. Martin's Press. ISBN 978-1250040497.
- Freeman, Scott (1996). Midnight Riders: The Story of the Allman Brothers Band. Little, Brown and Company. ISBN 978-0316294522.
- Poe, Randy (2008). Skydog: The Duane Allman Story. Backbeat Books. ISBN 978-0879309398.
- Allman, Gregg; Light, Alan (2012). My Cross to Bear. William Morrow. ISBN 978-0062112033.
