= Warner Theatre, Erie, PA 7-19-05 =

Live album by The Allman Brothers Band
- Released: October 16, 2020
- Recorded: July 19, 2005
- Venue: Warner Theatre; Erie, Pennsylvania
- Genre: Southern rock, blues rock
- Length: 147:06
- Label: Peach Records
- Producer: The Allman Brothers Band

The Allman Brothers Band chronology
The Final Note (2020)	Warner Theatre, Erie, PA 7-19-05 (2020)	Down in Texas '71 (2021)

Warner Theatre, Erie, PA 7-19-05 is a two-CD live album by the Allman Brothers Band. It was recorded on July 19, 2005, at the Warner Theatre in Erie, Pennsylvania. It was released on October 16, 2020. The album contains a complete concert performed by the 2001 to 2014 lineup of the band – Gregg Allman (keyboards, vocals), Warren Haynes (guitar, vocals), Derek Trucks (guitar), Oteil Burbridge (bass), Butch Trucks (drums), Jaimoe (drums), and Marc Quiñones (percussion, vocals).

== Critical reception ==
In Rock & Blues Muse, Mike O'Cull wrote, "... the Warner Theatre show turned out to be the greatest Allman Brothers show you've never heard and is proof positive that even the musicians, themselves, never knew when the magic was going to happen.... The Allman Brothers Band’s rep as one of the best live bands the USA has ever produced will never be tarnished. Allman fans know the songs in this concert well but never tire of hearing them. Shows like this are the reason why."

In Jazz Weekly, George W. Harris wrote, "The great thing about the latter period Allman Brothers is that, like the best of jazz bands, the song itself is not as important as the soloing, which changes from night to night. The guitar work by Trucks and Haynes is simply exhilarating, swirling like a tornado through a rural town, while the rhythm section is like a Class IV white water run on the Ocoee River."

In American Songwriter, Lee Zimmerman said, "It's all exceptional of course, a truly stand-out performance, although Allmans enthusiasts might note that there's little here that hasn’t been heard before. On the other hand, like true Grateful Dead devotees, fans often compulsively collect repeated live performances taken from various venues. In the case of this Warner Theatre show, it can easily be considered among the band's very best."

In American Highways, John Apice wrote, "Some believe this is one of the best Allman performances captured live.... Nothing sounds rehashed or reheated. This was the last and longest lineup. For Allman Brother fans and the newly curious – this is a meticulous set, well-recorded and performed without losing any of the enduring quality of what made the Allman Brothers a truly memorable, original and historic American band."

== Track listing ==
Disc 1

First set:

1. "Mountain Jam" (Donovan Leitch, Gregg Allman, Duane Allman, Dickey Betts, Jai Johanny Johanson, Berry Oakley, Butch Trucks) – 12:11
2. "Statesboro Blues" (Will McTell) – 5:16
3. "Firing Line" (G. Allman, Warren Haynes) – 6:47
4. "Good Morning Little School Girl" (Sonny Boy Williamson) – 12:48
5. "Midnight Rider" (G. Allman, Robert Kim Payne) – 3:27
6. "The High Cost of Low Living" (G. Allman, Haynes, Jeff Anders, Ronnie Burgin) – 9:33
7. "Trouble No More" (McKinley Morganfield) – 3:43
8. "Mountain Jam" reprise (Leitch, G. Allman, D. Allman, Betts, Johanson, Oakley, Trucks) – 9:30

Second set:

9. "Melissa" (G. Allman, Stephen Alaimo) – 6:23
10. "The Night They Drove Old Dixie Down" (Robbie Robertson) – 5:06
11. "Don't Keep Me Wonderin'" (G. Allman) – 4:38

Disc 2

1. "Into the Mystic" (Van Morrison) – 5:14
2. "Dreams" (G. Allman) – 11:13
3. "Leave My Blues at Home" (G. Allman) – 2:40
4. "Jabuma" (Johanson, Trucks, Marc Quiñones) – 16:39
5. "Leave My Blues At Home" reprise (G. Allman) – 3:56
6. "Don't Think Twice, It's All Right" (Bob Dylan) – 5:44
7. "Jessica" (Betts) – 16:14

Encore:

8. "One Way Out" (Marshall Sehorn, Elmore James) – 6:01

== Personnel ==
The Allman Brothers Band

- Gregg Allman – Hammond B-3 organ, piano, acoustic guitar, vocals
- Warren Haynes – guitar, vocals
- Derek Trucks – guitar
- Oteil Burbridge – bass
- Butch Trucks – drums
- Jaimoe – drums
- Marc Quiñones – congas, percussion, vocals

Additional musicians

- Susan Tedeschi – guitar and vocals on "Don't Think Twice, It's All Right"

Production

- Produced by the Allman Brothers Band
- Executive producer: Bert Holman
- Project supervision: Kirk West, John Lynskey, Bill Levenson
- Liner notes: John Lynskey
- Mastering: Jason NeSmith
- Photography: Kirk West, John Hough
- Package design: Terry Bradley
