= Manley Field House, Syracuse University, April 7, 1972 =

Live album by the Allman Brothers Band

Live album by The Allman Brothers Band
- Released: January 12, 2024
- Recorded: April 7, 1972
- Venue: Manley Field House
- Genre: Blues rock, Southern rock
- Length: 94:54
- Label: Allman Brothers Band Recording Company
- Producer: Allman Brothers Band

The Allman Brothers Band chronology
Syria Mosque (2022)	Manley Field House, Syracuse University, April 7, 1972 (2024)	Final Concert 10-28-14 (2024)

Manley Field House, Syracuse University, April 7, 1972 is a two-CD live album by the rock group the Allman Brothers Band. As the name suggests, it was recorded at Manley Field House in Syracuse, New York on April 7, 1972. It was released on January 12, 2024.

The Syracuse concert was recorded several months after the death of guitarist Duane Allman. It features the other five original members of the Allman Brothers Band – Gregg Allman on keyboards and vocals, Dickey Betts on guitar, Berry Oakley on bass, and Jai Johanny Johanson and Butch Trucks on drums. Another live album with the same lineup is Macon City Auditorium: 2/11/72.

== Critical reception ==
In Grateful Web, Gabriel David Barkin wrote, "The Allman Brothers have had a plethora of amazing guitar players in their lineup, mostly two at a time (the latter-day version with Warren Haynes and Derek Trucks was notably delicious), but the Betts-only years had their own magic steeped in the blues maestro’s own blend of Southern comfort.... The way the mics captured Oakley may be the best thing about this recording. His Fender Jazz "Tractor" bass is prominent on every cut."

In Under the Radar, Frank Valish said, "What's striking about this concert is first and foremost the absence of Duane. Betts does a fine job of filling Duane’s shoes, but there is a certain guitar energy found in early ABB performances that is still missing here. But the other thing that stands out... is Oakley. His bass, which is high in the mix, becomes just as much of a star as the band's guitar, keyboards, or vocals on this night."

In Glide Magazine, Doug Collette wrote, "The range and power of their imagination render fresh an otherwise familiar array of covers and originals... Manley Field House Syracuse University April 7, 1972 is thus an essential entry in the ABB discography, and at the same time, an indispensable missing link in the history of the increasingly influential blues-rock ensemble."

== Track listing ==
Disc 1

1. Introduction – 0:41
2. "Statesboro Blues" (Will McTell) – 4:27
3. "Done Somebody Wrong" (Clarence L. Lewis, Elmore James, Morris Levy) – 3:52
4. "Ain't Wastin' Time No More" (Gregg Allman) – 5:12
5. "One Way Out" (Elmore James, Marshall Sehorn) – 6:31
6. "Stormy Monday (T-Bone Walker) – 8:26
7. "You Don't Love Me" (Willie Cobbs) – 15:51

Disc 2

1. "In Memory of Elizabeth Reed" (Dickey Betts) – 15:33
2. "Midnight Rider" (Gregg Allman, Robert Kim Payne) – 3:04
3. "Whipping Post" (Gregg Allman) – 20:37
4. "Syracuse Jam" (Gregg Allman, Dickey Betts, Jai Johanny Johanson, Berry Oakley, Butch Trucks) – 5:46
5. "Hot 'Lanta" (Gregg Allman, Duane Allman, Dickey Betts, Jai Johanny Johanson, Berry Oakley, Butch Trucks) – 4:51

== Personnel ==
The Allman Brothers Band

- Gregg Allman – vocals, Hammond B3 organ, piano
- Dickey Betts – lead guitar
- Berry Oakley – bass guitar
- Jaimoe – drums, percussion
- Butch Trucks – drums, tympani

Production

- Produced by the Allman Brothers Band
- Executive producer: Bert Holman
- Project supervision: Kirk West, John Lynskey, Bill Levenson
- Liner notes: Jeff Chard
- Mastering: Jason NeSmith
- Package design: Terry Bradley
