= Down in Texas '71 =

Live album by The Allman Brothers Band
- Released: March 26, 2021
- Recorded: September 28, 1971
- Venue: Austin Municipal Auditorium; Austin, Texas
- Genre: Blues rock, Southern rock
- Label: Allman Brothers Band Recording Company
- Producer: The Allman Brothers Band

The Allman Brothers Band chronology
Warner Theatre, Erie, PA 7-19-05 (2020)	Down in Texas '71 (2021)	Syria Mosque (2022)

Down in Texas '71 is a live album by the Allman Brothers Band. It was recorded on September 28, 1971, at the Austin Municipal Auditorium in Austin, Texas. It was released on March 26, 2021.

This recording features the original lineup of the Allman Brothers Band. Saxophonist Rudolph "Juicy" Carter sits in on six of the nine songs. The album includes a bonus track with a 13-minute interview of Berry Oakley and Duane Allman for a radio station in Houston from June 6, 1971, about three months before the concert was recorded.

== Critical reception ==
In the Sarasota Herald-Tribune Wade Tatangelo wrote that they were "the hottest band in the country... Carter's contributions are at times a bit too skronky".

On Cryptic Rock Vito Tanzi said they were "one of the greatest Southern Rock bands in history... Down in Texas '71 is simply a gift adding to a plethora of live performances."

John Apice of Americana Highways said their performance was "stellar" and also that "few listeners will sit through the poor recording quality."

A reviewer for Jambands.com said they were "smoking good... It's all very crisp and energetic."

Writing for Sea of Tranquility, Jon Neudorf said "the band was at their creative and performing peak and what makes this an even more important musical document is the tragic passing of Duane Allman just over a month later."

== Track listing ==
1. "Statesboro Blues" (Will McTell) – 5:01
2. "Trouble No More" (McKinley Morganfield) – 4:43
3. "Don't Keep Me Wonderin'" (Gregg Allman) – 4:03
4. "Done Somebody Wrong" (Clarence Lewis, Elmore James, Morris Levy) – 3:36
5. "One Way Out" (Marshall Sehorn, Elmore James) – 5:26
6. "In Memory of Elizabeth Reed" [incomplete] (Dickey Betts) – 6:09
7. "Stormy Monday" (T-Bone Walker) – 9:03
8. "You Don't Love Me" (Willie Cobbs) – 15:11
9. "Hot 'Lanta" (Gregg Allman, Duane Allman, Dickey Betts, Butch Trucks, Berry Oakley, Jai Johanny Johanson) – 7:40
10. Berry Oakley and Duane Allman 06/06/71 Houston TX interview – 13:04

== Personnel ==
The Allman Brothers Band

- Duane Allman – lead and slide guitars
- Gregg Allman – vocals, Hammond B3 organ, piano
- Dickey Betts – lead guitar
- Berry Oakley – bass guitar
- Jaimoe – drums, percussion
- Butch Trucks – drums, tympani

Additional musicians

- Rudolph "Juicy" Carter – saxophone on "Statesboro Blues", "Don't Keep Me Wonderin'", "In Memory of Elizabeth Reed", "Stormy Monday", "You Don't Love Me", "Hot 'Lanta"

Production

- Produced by the Allman Brothers Band
- Executive producer: Bert Holman
- Project supervision: Kirk West, John Lynskey, Bill Levenson
- Liner notes: John Lynskey
- Mastering: Jason NeSmith
- Package design: Terry Bradley
