= Mountain Jam =

1969 instrumental by The Allman Brothers Band

Instrumental by The Allman Brothers Band

from the album Eat a Peach
- Released: 1991 (Ludlow), 2003 (AIPF), July 1971 (Fillmore), 1972 (Eat A Peach)
- Recorded: April 1970 (Ludlow), July 1970 (AIPF), March 1971 (Fillmore/Eat A Peach)
- Genre: Jam rock, instrumental rock
- Length: 44:00 (Ludlow Garage), 17:27/28:20 (Atlanta International Pop Festival), 33:41 (Fillmore/Eat a Peach)
- Label: Polydor, Epic / Legacy, Capricorn Records
- Songwriters: Donovan Leitch; Duane Allman; Gregg Allman; Dickey Betts; Jai Johanny Johanson; Berry Oakley; Butch Trucks

"Mountain Jam" is an improvised instrumental jam by The Allman Brothers Band, based on Donovan's 1967 hit song "There Is a Mountain". Performed throughout the group's career, "Mountain Jam" was originally released in 1972 on the album Eat a Peach, as recorded at the Fillmore East concert hall in March 1971 (during the same sessions that produced their prior live double album At Fillmore East). It is this rendition, that takes up two sides of that vinyl album, that is best known. As a composition, it is credited to all six band members – Duane Allman, Gregg Allman, Dickey Betts, Jai Johanny Johanson, Berry Oakley, and Butch Trucks – as well as to Donovan Leitch.

Other live recordings were released on the Allmans albums Fillmore East, February 1970, Live at Ludlow Garage: 1970, Live at the Atlanta International Pop Festival: July 3 & 5, 1970, The Fillmore Concerts, and deluxe edition of At Fillmore East (1971). Notably, Live at the Atlanta International Pop Festival: July 3 & 5, 1970 contains two recordings of the song, the second of which features guest musicians Johnny Winter on slide guitar and Thom Doucette on harmonica. Renditions by the 2000s era of the group can be found on the retrospective live albums Cream of the Crop 2003, The Fox Box (2004), and Warner Theatre, Erie, PA 7-19-05. A performance from the band's final concert in 2014 is included on the album Final Concert 10-28-14.

Writers such as musician-critic Tony Glover for Rolling Stone and group biographer Scott Freeman have examined at length the structure regarding, and extolled the virtues of, the Eat a Peach performance. Not quite as enthusiastic is Stephen Thomas Erlewine of AllMusic, who assesses it as "a sprawling 33-minute jam that may feature a lot of great playing, but is certainly a little hard for anyone outside of diehards to sit through."

The Mountain Jam festival, held in Upstate New York beginning in 2005 and at which the Allmans appeared twice, is named after the instrumental.

== Evolution ==
Duane Allman was not a fan of Donovan in particular, but liked the happy-sounding melody and found it a good underpinning for improvisation. It had joined the group's concert repertoire by May 1969; the first known recording of a performance was done on May 4, 1969, at Central City Park in Macon, Georgia. It represented the kind of open-ended numbers that the group was employing to refine and project their instrumental abilities and soon became of the highlights of their shows. By early 1970, performances were stretching to a half hour in length. However, the performances were often rambling and without direction. It continued to evolve, and gained more specificity and focused sectioning. It was typically the closing number of their shows.

An April 1970 performance at Ludlow Garage, a music venue in Cincinnati, produced a 44-minute "Mountain Jam" that was released two decades later on the album Live at Ludlow Garage: 1970. One writer, the Duane Allman biographer Randy Poe, has felt this superior to the Eat a Peach rendition. In contrast, Bruce Eder of AllMusic considers it "searing though somewhat disjointed", and David Browne of Rolling Stone says that "only die-hard Allmanites will want to wade through" it at its "forty-four mind-boggling minutes" of length.

Two July 1970 performances of "Mountain Jam" occurred at the 1970 Atlanta International Pop Festival, the first that was interrupted by a rain delay and the second, two days later, with guest musician Johnny Winter joining in. Both performances also featured band friend and informal member Thom Doucette on harmonica. While a couple of Allman Brothers numbers appeared on the 1971 triple live album The First Great Rock Festivals of the Seventies, "Mountain Jam" was not one of them; that would have to wait for the 2003 release Live at the Atlanta International Pop Festival: July 3 & 5, 1970, which included both days' performances. Writer Thom Jurek considers the second performance to be superior to the Eat a Peach one.

== Quotations and other performances ==
Another influential late 1960s and early 1970s jam band, the Grateful Dead, had occasionally quoted short references to "First There is a Mountain" in shows and in the studio. The band can be heard briefly quoting a few bars of it in their song "Alligator" on their 1968 album Anthem of the Sun. Another example of Jerry Garcia incorporating the "There Is a Mountain" riff can be heard at the 4:53 mark on the version of "Alligator" the band performed at their August 21, 1968, show at the Fillmore West. No evidence has appeared indicating that any of this was an influence on Duane Allman adopting "There Is a Mountain" as an Allman Brothers jam song beginning in 1969.

An example of Garcia and Allman playing "There Is a Mountain" together is recounted in the book Bill Graham Presents, when one night at the Fillmore East in early 1970, with The Allman Brothers on the bill with the Grateful Dead and Fleetwood Mac, stagehand Allan Arkush observed Allman, Garcia, and Fleetwood Mac's Peter Green jamming together.

In its full band form, "Mountain Jam" can be heard in a 31-minute rendition from the Allman Brothers' regular set during these shows, as captured on the record Fillmore East, February 1970. In The Music Box, John Metzger said, "... The highlight of this album ... is the nearly 31-minute 'Mountain Jam' that drips with a colorfully electrified intensity."

The Grateful Dead was also captured playing a 55-second sequence hinting at "There Is a Mountain" to transition between "Going Down the Road Feeling Bad" and "Not Fade Away" on November 6, 1970, at Capitol Theater in Port Chester, New York.

An example of the Allman Brothers playing "Mountain Jam" with the Grateful Dead occurred at the conclusion of the 1973 Summer Jam at Watkins Glen headlined by the Allman Brothers. A 22:57 version was performed on July 28, with members of the Grateful Dead and the third act on the festival bill, The Band, joining in.

Another sit-in by Garcia came at the end of 1973, when Garcia was among those joining the Allmans for "Mountain Jam" at the end of a long, nationally broadcast New Year's Eve show at the Cow Palace in San Francisco.

== Eat a Peach structure ==
The first publicly available recording of "Mountain Jam" was a 33:41 version which appeared on the Allman Brothers' 1972 double-album, Eat a Peach. Taken from the March 1971 live recordings at the Filmore East, it is the same version that had briefly been heard at the conclusion of "Whipping Post", the final track of At Fillmore East, before being faded out.

It was also the only proper multi-track recording available, and included the entire compliment of the original band.

The performance starts quietly with Butch Trucks' insistent tympani beat fading in, soon followed by Duane Allman stating the theme against counterfigures from Dickey Betts; Jai Johanny Johanson joins in with drums, followed by the rest of the band members, and when Trucks returns to his drum kit the main melody is played in unison. It then switches into a swing-like shuffle. The general feel of the arrangement is that of rock music mixed with jazz improvisation.

The instrumental then features solos from all of the band members. Duane Allman starts with a guitar solo, after which Gregg Allman solos on Hammond organ, followed by a guitar solo by Dickey Betts. Betts' part features prominent interplay with Berry Oakley on bass. This winds down and Duane plays bird call effects on slide guitar; these echo the ones Duane had played the previous year at the conclusion of the Derek and the Dominos classic recording "Layla".

As this point, midway through the performance, there is a drum duet by Trucks and Johanson, later joined by a bass solo by Oakley. On the original vinyl record (the B side of record 1) the song fades out here, then resumes with a fade-in (on the B side of record 2), with overlap provided to preserve continuity.

Following the drum solo the rest of the band joins in. Jimi Hendrix's "Third Stone from the Sun" is quoted musically in the piece, roughly 22 minutes in. Duane leads the next section with some of his best-known slide guitar work, 23 minutes in. The contemporaneous review of Eat a Peach in Rolling Stone said that "Duane takes off on a truly possessed solo, walking that knife-edge between mellow and madness – the old devil/saint demon that exists in every artist pouring out through his fingers."

Duane's solo quiets down, and he returns to playing straight lead guitar, quoting the traditional Southern hymn "Will the Circle Be Unbroken?" a little past the 27 minutes mark. That song had special meaning to both Allmans, with Duane frequently working it into "Mountain Jam, and Gregg Allman casually playing it on guitar during off-days. In time, the hymn found an important presence within the Allman Brothers community, and would be played by the band at Duane Allman's funeral in October 1971.

Said writer Scott Freeman of Duane's playing during the second half of the Eat a Peach performance, it "carries a sad beauty; he may have sounded as good, but never better."

The band returns to playing the "There Is a Mountain" theme in unison, followed by waves of chords and ensemble sound with Trucks back on tympani. The recording ends with Duane thanking the audience for coming and introducing his bandmates, with himself last.

Consistent with At Filmore East, no overdubs were made to the live recording as included on Eat a Peach.

The contemporaneous review of Eat a Peach in Rolling Stone by Tony Glover was quite praising of all aspects of "Mountain Jam". In 1979, The Rolling Stone Album Guide said that the performance "abounds in breathtaking musical interplay". Group biographer Alan Paul considers it lacking in some of the immediate urgency that At Fillmore East was known for. Two of the group's members subsequently voiced criticism of that particular performance's playing of "Mountain Jam", with Trucks characterizing it as mediocre and Betts as their worst effort. Part of this self-criticism may have been due to – despite Duane giving a count-in – the band botching the re-entrance after the bass solo, with Trucks in particular out of synch for a while.

Gregg Allman later said that the inclusion of "Mountain Jam" on the next record after At Fillmore East had always been intended, hence the incorporation of its start at the conclusion of "Whipping Post", and that it was not added simply to fill out Eat a Peach after Duane's passing. However, Butch Trucks later said that had Duane not died, it would not have been included and Eat a Peach would have been only a single album.

== Later iterations ==
"Mountain Jam" remained a part of the Allman Brothers' rotating concert repertoire throughout the group's multiple re-formings and personnel changes, although not always as the show closer that it had once been. Indeed, the group unusually opened a show with it in 2000, as a way of introducing their sound with replacement member Jimmy Herring on guitar. The band's lineup subsequently stabilized with Derek Trucks and Warren Haynes as the two guitarists, Oteil Burbridge on bass, and Marc Quiñones on additional percussion. By 2008, the group was sometimes both opening shows with "Mountain Jam" and then reprising it at the show's end.

In the group's farewell show, at the Beacon Theatre in 2014, portions of "Mountain Jam" were again played twice, both early in the first set and toward the end of the third set, the latter with "Will the Circle Be Unbroken" incorporated. This show was later released as the album Final Concert 10-28-14.

"Mountain Jam" had begun as a vehicle for band explorations, and remained so. According to longtime roadie Red Dog, the band played "Mountain Jam" differently every night in its early days. In a 2000 show at the PNC Bank Arts Center in 2000 Derek Trucks, Herring, and bassist Burbridge detuned their instruments during the section before the drum solos. Several minutes of distorted electronic noises and abstract effects followed. This taking of the number "off the rails" and "to Mars", as Derek Trucks later characterized it, caused Gregg Allman to speak angrily to them after the show. But Gregg soon apologized, saying that back in the day he and his brother Duane had frequently had the same disagreements about how far to stray musically during a piece and that the guitarists should do what they do.
