= S.U.N.Y. at Stonybrook: Stonybrook, NY 9/19/71 =

Live album by The Allman Brothers Band
- Released: 2003
- Recorded: September 19, 1971
- Venue: Stony Brook University Gym (Stony Brook, New York)
- Genre: Blues rock
- Length: 106:39
- Label: The Allman Brothers Band Recording Company
- Producer: The Allman Brothers Band

The Allman Brothers Band chronology
Live at the Atlanta International Pop Festival: July 3 & 5, 1970 (2003)	S.U.N.Y. at Stonybrook: Stonybrook, NY 9/19/71 (2003)	One Way Out (2004)

S.U.N.Y. at Stonybrook: Stonybrook, NY 9/19/71 is a two-CD live album by the Allman Brothers Band. The second of a series of archival concert albums from the Allman Brothers Band Recording Company, it features the original lineup of the group. It was released in 2003.

== History ==
The album includes performances from two shows at the Stony Brook Gym, on the campus of Stony Brook University, on September 19, 1971 – five weeks prior to the death of Duane Allman. An emergent research university situated roughly fifty-five miles east of Midtown Manhattan, Stony Brook was suffused with a countercultural elan throughout the era. Five Allman Brothers Band concerts at the university in the late 1960s and early 1970s have been documented; on one occasion, the group rehearsed at the Tabler Quad residence hall.

The elder Allman's role as bandleader is multiply evident: the signed contract for the concert included in the album's packaging, he announces the songs, and barks orders at the sound crew, sometimes in mid-song.

The Allman Brothers' website suggests the evening's stand-out performances were "Blue Sky", the only live version featuring Duane Allman that has been released by the band, and "Dreams", a showcase for his flatpicking and slide guitar skills.

An advisory in the liner notes states, "The live mix evolved from the first song & continued to improve as the set progressed. Great care was taken to improve the sonic quality of the first few tracks to achieve a pleasing audio experience."

== Critical reception ==
Professional ratings
Review scores
Source	Rating
Allmusic	4/5 stars

On AllMusic William Ruhlman wrote, "The titles may be familiar, but the jamming is not, as the band explores different ways to approach the songs... Six months after the legendary shows that produced their signature recording, At Fillmore East, and just before they changed forever with Duane Allman's death, this is the sound of the Allman Brothers Band at their peak. (Sound quality is below par at the outset as the mix is adjusted, but after a few songs in is perfectly acceptable.)"

In The Republican Keven O'Hare said, "Comprised of a mix between the afternoon matinee and the evening show, the set is pretty consistent with the Allman Brothers of that era, starting off with a rockin' "Statesboro Blues". While some of the material stretched out into the improvisational stratosphere, the band could also be very economical musically at times, here using just three minutes and 47 seconds to deliver a slide-fueled wonderwork version of "Don't Keep Me Wonderin'"."

In The Aquarian Weekly Giorgio Mustica wrote, "Though we can’t travel back in time and see one of the greatest Southern rock groups ever at what was arguably their peak, The Allman Brothers Band has put forth this new release as a spectacular aural account of their heyday.... If you want to hear some classic Southern rock, be sure to pick up this album."

== Track listing ==
Disc 1

1. "Statesboro Blues" (Blind Willie McTell) – 4:16
2. "Trouble No More" (Muddy Waters) – 4:00
3. "Don't Keep Me Wonderin'" (Gregg Allman) – 3:47
4. "Done Somebody Wrong" (Elmore James, Clarence Lewis, Bobby Robinson) – 3:54
5. "One Way Out" (Elmore James, Marshall Sehorn, Sonny Boy Williamson II) – 5:08
6. "Blue Sky" (Dickey Betts) – 11:26
7. "Stormy Monday" (T-Bone Walker) – 8:53
8. "You Don't Love Me" (Willie Cobbs) – 25:47

Disc 2

1. "Dreams" (Gregg Allman) – 19:37
2. "In Memory of Elizabeth Reed" (Dickey Betts) – 19:43

== Personnel ==
The Allman Brothers Band

- Duane Allman – lead guitar, slide guitar
- Gregg Allman – vocals, Hammond B3 organ
- Dickey Betts – lead guitar, vocals
- Berry Oakley – bass guitar
- Jaimoe – drums, percussion
- Butch Trucks – drums, tympani

Production

- Recording produced by the Allman Brothers Band
- Package produced by Kirk West, Bert Holman
- Live mix: Mike Callahan
- Mastering: Skip Slaughter
- Package design: Jeff Faith
