= Live at the Atlanta International Pop Festival: July 3 & 5, 1970 =

Live album by The Allman Brothers Band
- Released: October 21, 2003
- Recorded: July 3 and 5, 1970
- Venue: Atlanta Pop Festival
- Genre: Southern rock, blues rock, jam rock
- Length: 154:39
- Label: Epic / Legacy
- Producer: Jerry Rappaport

The Allman Brothers Band chronology
Live at the Beacon Theatre (2003)	Live at the Atlanta International Pop Festival: July 3 & 5, 1970 (2003)	S.U.N.Y. at Stonybrook: Stonybrook, NY 9/19/71 (2003)

Live at the Atlanta International Pop Festival: July 3 & 5, 1970 is a two-CD live album by the Allman Brothers Band. It features their two performances at the 1970 Atlanta International Pop Festival, at the Middle Georgia Raceway in Byron, Georgia. It was released in 2003.

The festival took place nearly a year before the concerts that appear on At Fillmore East. Highlights include a "Mountain Jam" on which Johnny Winter guests. The concert dates listed on the album are July 3 and July 5, but the second performance did not take place until 3:50 am on July 6, according to the liner notes.

== Critical reception ==
Professional ratings
Review scores
Source	Rating
Allmusic	4.5/5 stars
The Music Box	4/5 stars

On AllMusic Thom Jurek said, "While it won't replace At Fillmore East as the greatest live record ever made, this is an essential purchase for ABB fans, one that gives us the treat of a dignified rendering of a very important and defining moment in the band's early career. It also provides an excellent, even mind-blowing introduction to a band that was at the peak of its power."

On PopMatters Adam Williams wrote, "The importance of the Atlanta Pop recordings to the Allman's legacy cannot be overstated. The twin discs predate the historic At Fillmore East double album by nary a year, offering initial proof of the band's brilliance on stage. Additionally, the festival footage captures the original lineup at its early peak..."

In Vintage Guitar John Heidt said, "I’ve had the argument many times that the original version of the Allman Brothers Band was the best blues-rock band in the history of rock.... Some of this has been bootlegged before, but the sound here is terrific. Kirk West's liner notes are informative and fun, and there are some great photos in the small booklet. If you're a fan of this band, you gotta have this."

In The Music Box John Metzger wrote, "For those in the know, it’s a joy to hear how the band transforms its songs into something new and different each and every night.... Each disc represents a single concert, and each stands on its own as a testament to the power that was wielded on a nightly basis by the Allman Brothers Band."

== Track listing ==
Disc one: 7/3/1970

1. Introduction – 1:04
2. "Statesboro Blues" (Blind Willie McTell) – 6:05
3. "Trouble No More" (Muddy Waters) – 4:04
4. "Don't Keep Me Wonderin'" (Gregg Allman) – 3:49
5. "Dreams" (Gregg Allman) – 9:49
6. "Every Hungry Woman" (Gregg Allman) – 4:31
7. "Hoochie Coochie Man" (Willie Dixon) – 5:29
8. "In Memory of Elizabeth Reed" (Dickey Betts) – 11:35
9. "Whipping Post" (Gregg Allman) – 14:47
10. "Mountain Jam" Part 1 (Donovan Leitch, Duane Allman, Gregg Allman, Dickey Betts, Berry Oakley, Butch Trucks, Jai Johnny Johanson) – 10:36
11. Rain delay – 1:15
12. "Mountain Jam" Part 2 (Donovan Leitch, Duane Allman, Gregg Allman, Dickey Betts, Berry Oakley, Butch Trucks, Jai Johnny Johanson) – 6:51

Disc two: 7/5/1970

1. Introduction – 1:10
2. "Don't Keep Me Wonderin'" (Gregg Allman) – 4:04
3. "Statesboro Blues" (Blind Willie McTell) – 4:25
4. "In Memory of Elizabeth Reed" (Dickey Betts) – 13:14
5. "Stormy Monday" (T-Bone Walker) – 9:04
6. "Whipping Post" (Gregg Allman) – 14:23
7. "Mountain Jam" (Donovan Leitch, Duane Allman, Gregg Allman, Dickey Betts, Berry Oakley, Butch Trucks, Jai Johnny Johanson) – 28:20

Disc two: 7/5/1970 “Mountain Jam” includes the melody from “Little Bitty Pretty One”.

== Personnel ==
The Allman Brothers Band

- Gregg Allman: Hammond B-3 organ, keyboards, vocals
- Duane Allman: guitar, slide guitar
- Dickey Betts: guitar
- Berry Oakley: bass guitar, vocals
- Butch Trucks: drums, tympani
- Jai Johanny Johanson: drums, percussion
- Thom Doucette: harmonica

Additional musicians

- Johnny Winter: guitar on "Mountain Jam" from July 5 show

Production

- Produced for release by Jerry Rappaport
- Co-producer: Kirk West
- Recording: Ray Colcard, Harry Zerler
- Engineering: Norbert Ward, Tim Geelan, Russ Payne
- Mixing: Thom Cadley
- Mastering: Joseph M. Palmaccio, Mark Wilder
- Art direction: Howard Fritzon
- Design: Rebecca Waterfall
