= Syria Mosque (album) =

Live album by The Allman Brothers Band
- Released: October 28, 2022
- Recorded: January 17, 1971
- Venue: Syria Mosque
- Genre: Blues rock, Southern rock
- Length: 64:36
- Label: Allman Brothers Band Recording Company
- Producer: Allman Brothers Band

The Allman Brothers Band chronology
Down in Texas '71 (2021)	Syria Mosque (2022)	Manley Field House, Syracuse University, April 7, 1972 (2024)

Syria Mosque is a live album by the American rock group the Allman Brothers Band. It was recorded on January 17, 1971, at the Syria Mosque in Pittsburgh, Pennsylvania. It was released for streaming and downloading on October 28, 2022, and was released on CD on December 16, 2022. It was released as a two-disc LP on April 22, 2023.

The album features the original lineup of the Allman Brothers Band. Bootleg recordings of this performance have circulated in the past, sometimes with an incorrect recording date. The opening act at this concert was Taj Mahal.

== Critical reception ==
In Glide Magazine Doug Collette wrote, "Extremely well-paced and often as not fiery in its intensity, the performance contained herein is the latest in a long line of vault releases featuring the original six-man lineup of the Allman Brothers Band. And while it is yet another iteration of the brilliance self-evident on At Fillmore East, it's noteworthy insofar as it constitutes a complete performance, in generally acceptable audio quality, inside a stylish and detailed packaging..."

In The Spill Magazine Gerrod Harris said, "While not the greatest quality of sound – the record was recorded straight from the venue's board and has since been remastered – Syria Mosque is a snapshot of the Allman Brothers Band at their peak..... Among the absolutely vast collection of official and unofficial live records from this era of the Allman Brothers Band, and their entire career for that matter, Syria Mosque can stand among some of the greatest live displays from this acclaimed band."

In All About Jazz Doug Collette wrote, "On the surface, the Allman Brothers Band's Syria Mosque Pittsburgh, PA January 17, 1971 would appear to be just another in a long line of live releases featuring the original six-man lineup of the archetypal Southern blues-rockers. It is, however, markedly superior on many fronts.... And while there are a couple of lapses in what are otherwise fairly clear sonics, those instances do not undermine the consistently powerful playing that inspired its release in such stylish physical form."

A reviewer for Jambands.com noted that the album is "a bit rough, and a bit prone to some emphasis in the wrong spots," but suggested that the listener "focus on the playing, the symbiosis, and the bubbling strength of the repertoire that would boil over eight weeks later" at the Fillmore East.

== Track listing ==
1. Introduction – 0:34
2. "Statesboro Blues" (Blind Willie McTell) – 4:14
3. "Trouble No More" (McKinley Morganfield) – 3:43
4. "Don't Keep Me Wonderin'" (Gregg Allman) – 3:16
5. "In Memory of Elizabeth Reed" (Dickey Betts) – 14:34
6. "Midnight Rider" (Gregg Allman, Robert Kim Payne) – 2:59
7. "You Don't Love Me" (Willie Cobbs) – 14:58
8. "Whipping Post" (Gregg Allman) – 20:16

== Personnel ==
Allman Brothers Band

- Duane Allman – lead and slide guitars
- Gregg Allman – vocals, Hammond B3 organ, piano
- Dickey Betts – lead guitar
- Berry Oakley – bass guitar
- Jaimoe – drums, percussion
- Butch Trucks – drums, tympani

Production

- Produced by Allman Brothers Band
- Executive producer: Bert Holman
- Project supervision: Bill Levenson, John Lynskey, Kirk West
- Liner notes: John Lynskey
- Mastering: Jason NeSmith
- Photography: Bruce Hock
- Package design: Terry Bradley
