= Live at Great Woods =

- DVD cover

Video by The Allman Brothers Band
- Released: 1992
- Recorded: September 6, 1991
- Venue: Great Woods Amphitheater
- Genre: Southern rock
- Length: 91 minutes
- Label: Legacy Recordings

The Allman Brothers Band chronology
| A Decade of Hits 1969–1979 (1991) | Live at Great Woods (1992) | An Evening with the Allman Brothers Band: First Set (1992) |

Live at Great Woods is a concert video by the Allman Brothers Band. It was recorded on September 6, 1991, at Great Woods Amphitheater in Mansfield, Massachusetts.

Live at Great Woods was originally produced for Japanese TV, and was released on VHS and LaserDisc in 1992. A version of the video was released on DVD in 1998, but in a shortened form, with interviews of the band members edited into the song performances. The 2014 version of the DVD omits the interviews and contains the complete performances of the songs. The DVD was reissued on March 26, 2021.

The video features the 1991 to 1997 lineup of the Allman Brothers band – Gregg Allman on keyboards and vocals, Dickey Betts on guitar and vocals, Warren Haynes on guitar and vocals, Allen Woody on bass, Butch Trucks on drums, Jaimoe on drums, and Marc Quiñones on congas and percussion.

== Critical reception ==
In All About Jazz Doug Collette wrote, "Material both new (at the time) and familiar... leads to an abbreviated acoustic set that reaffirms the expert pacing.... Despite the lack of ingenuity in the camera work, the power of the Allman Brothers playing... is undeniable."

On jambands.com Larson Sutton said, "Newest members Warren Haynes, Allen Woody, and Marc Quinones are exceptional in their abilities to assimilate and sparkle, each bringing a personal approach that echoes the group's inimitable sense of unity and expression, yet allows them to showcase their respective styles and skills."

In American Songwriter Hal Horowitz wrote, "The seven piece delivers the blues rocking goods, looking particularly hairy yet inspired and sounding spirited, especially on a fiery "Hootchie Coochie Man" sung by Haynes and a short but potent acoustic section."

== Track listing ==
1. "Statesboro Blues" (Will McTell)
2. "End of the Line" (Gregg Allman, Warren Haynes, Allen Woody, John Jaworowicz)
3. "Blue Sky" (Dickey Betts)
4. "Midnight Rider" (Allman, Robert Payne)
5. "Going Down the Road" (Woody Guthrie, Lee Hays)
6. "Hoochie Coochie Man" (Willie Dixon)
7. "Get On With Your Life" (Allman)
8. "In Memory of Elizabeth Reed" (Betts)
9. "Revival" (Betts)
10. "Jessica" (Betts)
11. "Whipping Post" (Allman)

== Personnel ==
Allman Brothers Band

- Gregg Allman – keyboards, vocals
- Dickey Betts – guitar, vocals
- Warren Haynes – guitar, vocals
- Allen Woody – bass, vocals
- Butch Trucks – drums, percussion
- Jai Johanny Johanson – drums, percussion
- Marc Quiñones – congas, percussion

Production

- Martin Pitts – director
