= Coricidin =

Brand name for a cough and pain medicine

- Chemical structures of dextromethorphan (top) and chlorpheniramine

Combination of
- Dextromethorphan: cough suppressant
- Chlorpheniramine: antihistamine

Clinical data
- Trade names: Coricidin 'D'

Pharmacokinetic data
- Metabolism: CYP2D6 isozyme of Cytochrome P450

Identifiers
- CAS Number: 125-71-3
- UNII: 7355X3ROTS

Coricidin, Coricidin 'D' (decongestant), or Coricidin HBP (for high blood pressure), is an over-the-counter cough and cold combination drug containing dextromethorphan (a cough suppressant) and chlorpheniramine maleate (a first-generation antihistamine). Introduced by Schering-Plough in 1949 as one of the first antihistamines, it is now owned by Bayer. Varieties of Coricidin may also contain acetaminophen (an analgesic/antipyretic) and guaifenesin (an expectorant).

== Medicinal use ==
Coricidin is used to alleviate common cold symptoms such as coughs and congestion. Other versions of Coricidin are used to reduce fever or as an expectorant, while Coricidin HBP includes chlorpheniramine for people with high blood pressure. Side effects can include diarrhea and hallucination.

== Recreational use ==
Coricidin, in its cough & cold formulation, is sometimes used in high doses as a recreational drug because it contains the dissociative dextromethorphan. In this context, Coricidin is referred to as Cs, Red Devils (Red Ds), Triple Cs, Skittles, Super skittles, trips, or china red.

== In popular culture ==
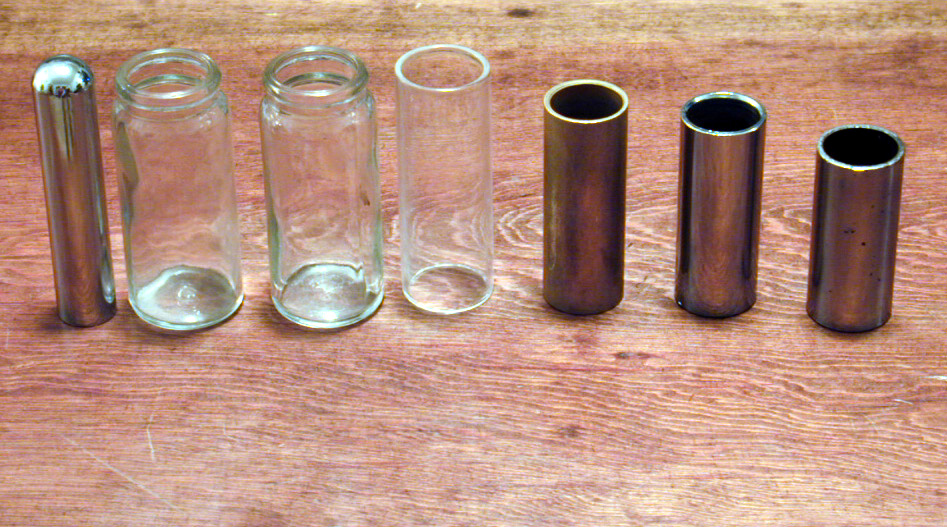
A selection of guitar slides, with two Coricidin bottles (second and third from left)

An empty glass Coricidin bottle was adopted as a guitar slide by blues-rock guitarist Duane Allman while teaching himself slide guitar in the late 1960s. Allman found it to be just the right size and shape for the purpose after receiving two birthday gifts from his brother, Gregg: a copy of Taj Mahal's debut album, with its version of "Statesboro Blues", and a bottle of Coricidin for a cold he had gotten. Other prominent slide guitarists, such as Derek Trucks (a later member of the Allman Brothers Band), Ray Wylie Hubbard, Rory Gallagher, J. D. Simo, and Gary Rossington also adopted the Coricidin bottle as a slide.
