= Ain't Wastin' Time No More =

Single by The Allman Brothers Band

from the album Eat a Peach
- B-side: "Melissa"
- Released: April 1972
- Recorded: December 1971; Criteria Studios, Miami, Florida
- Genre: Southern rock; blues rock
- Length: 3:40
- Label: Capricorn
- Songwriter(s): Gregg Allman
- Producer(s): Tom Dowd

The Allman Brothers Band singles chronology
"Midnight Rider" (1971)	"Ain't Wastin' Time No More" (1972)	"Melissa" (1972)

"Ain't Wastin' Time No More" is a song by the American rock band the Allman Brothers Band. It was the lead single from their third studio album, Eat a Peach (1972), released on Capricorn Records. The song, written by Gregg Allman, largely concerns the death of his brother, Duane Allman, who was killed in a motorcycle crash in 1971.

The song peaked at number 77 on the Billboard Hot 100 in 1972.

== Background ==
Following the death of group leader and guitarist Duane Allman, the Allman Brothers Band returned to the studio to complete Eat a Peach, which was midway through production at the time of his death. Much of the song's lyrical content deals with his death; Gregg Allman felt the subject "was the only thing I knew how to do right then." Allman had completed most of the song's music before his brother's death, but felt compelled to record it when bassist Berry Oakley and drummer Jaimoe asked about it. He proceeded to write the song's lyrics—which also concern soldiers returning home from the Vietnam War— on a Steinway piano at Criteria Studios in Miami, Florida, where it was recorded in December 1971. Guitarist Dickey Betts picked up slide guitar in the aftermath of the tragedy, and took time to make sure his performance on the song would be up to par. Allman later recalled that he remembered Betts practicing the slide part for the song on the airplane down to Miami.

== Charts ==
Chart (1972)	Peak position
US Billboard Hot 100	77

== Notes ==
=== Sources ===
- Paul, Alan (2014). One Way Out: The Inside History of the Allman Brothers Band. St. Martin's Press. ISBN 978-1250040497.
- Allman, Gregg; Light, Alan (2012). My Cross to Bear. William Morrow. ISBN 978-0062112033.
