= Joseph L. Campbell =

American roadie (1942–2011)

Joseph L. Campbell (March 27, 1942 – February 21, 2011), also known as the Legendary Red Dog, was a roadie for the Allman Brothers Band at different times over a thirty-year span. He wrote The Legendary Red Dog: a Book of Tails about his years as a roadie. In the movie Almost Famous, Zack Ward played the character "Red Dog", based on Campbell.

Before embarking on a career as a roadie, Campbell was a decorated Vietnam veteran attending college. After hearing the slide guitar piece Duane Allman added to Aretha Franklin's recording of "The Weight", Campbell was determined to see Allman perform solo. After the show, he stayed behind to tell Allman how much he admired his work. He later recalled that it seemed as if the Pied Piper was calling him and that music never sounded the same to him afterwards.

In the early days, Campbell would contribute his disability checks from the government to the band, which considered its road crew an essential part of the Allman Brotherhood.

== Early years ==
Campbell served in the Marine Corps and was wounded in action during the Vietnam War, receiving the Purple Heart medal. He also was a professional firefighter.

== Later life ==
He was retired and living in Macon, Georgia at the time of his death.
