= Done Somebody Wrong =

Single by Elmore James
- B-side: "Fine Little Mama"
- Released: December 1960
- Recorded: May 1960
- Studio: Beltone, New York City
- Genre: Blues
- Length: 2:20
- Label: Fire
- Songwriters: Elmore James, Eddie Kirkland (uncredited)
- Producer: Bobby Robinson

"Done Somebody Wrong" is an electric blues song recorded by Elmore James in 1960. Though he took sole writing credit for it and it came to be known as an Elmore James song, it was a reworking of the original, "I Must Have Done Somebody Wrong", written and recorded by Eddie Kirkland in 1959. James' version, which used the same lyrics but featured a start-stop rhythm and his signature slide guitar, became the established version. It was subsequently covered by The Yardbirds in 1965, David Clayton-Thomas in 1966, and, iconically, the Allman Brothers Band in 1971, as featured on their classic live album At Fillmore East.

According to Billboard magazine, the song became "more associated with the Allmans than with James in the end." The original version and Eddie Kirkland as its composer were both forgotten.

== Eddie Kirkland original ==
Kirkland moved around during his youth, but one classification of blues singers' heritages places him in the Alabama part of the "Eastern Piney Woods" region.

"I Must Have Done Somebody Wrong" is an electric blues, recorded by Kirkland for Fortune Records in Detroit, Michigan, in 1959. He was listed as the sole songwriter, with the recording credited on the 45 rpm record to Eddie Kirkland and His House Rockers. Personnel included Kirkland on vocals and guitar, Joe Dooms on piano, Jimmy Parner on drums, and Johnny Hooks on tenor saxophone. It was issued later that year on a 45 as Fortune 848, with a run time of 2:38 and "I Need You Baby" on the other side. Fortune did not indicate A- or B-sides to the record.

Unlike some blues songs based around boasts, "I Must Have Done Somebody Wrong" was centered on the acceptance of blame for having betrayed his woman's trust:

Yes, the whistle done blown, and the bell done tolled
My baby done caught that train, and now she's gone
I must have done somebody wrong
Yeah, I must have done some somebody wrong

It is an exemplar of the kind of blues where the singer knows they have made a bad mistake, but is unsure exactly what the mistake is, or why they did it. One book on mental health challenges uses the song as an example of rejection sensitivity, and speculates that a subsequent verse, in which the singer says "Gonna find me a new doctor, maybe my luck will change", may be referring to the value of psychotherapy.

== Elmore James version ==
In 1960, Eddie Kirkland ran into Elmore James in Cleveland, Ohio, and played James his record of "I Must Have Done Somebody Wrong"; James thought highly of the song and offered to record it jointly with Kirkland. According to Kirkland's later account, he gave James the go-ahead to record it alone, but said, "Just give me the credit for it," which James said would be done.

The Elmore James session that recorded the song was held at Beltone Studios in New York City, likely beginning the night of May 23, 1960, and running into the next day. The producer for the session was Bobby Robinson. James used Kirkland's lyrics, with only a few slight changes, and the melody was substantially the same. However James rearranged the song into a stop-time rhythm that highlighted the slide guitar he was known for. His version also benefitted from a rhythm guitar part by Wild Jimmy Spruill. Other players likely included Homesick James on bass guitar, Belton Evans on drums, Johnny Acey on piano, and Paul "Hucklebuck" Williams on baritone saxophone. As one writer later said, "the intensity of James' vocal and guitar," combined with the start-stop beat, "made it immediately unforgettable".

The 45 rpm record "Done Somebody Wrong", backed with "Fine Little Mama", was issued on Fire Records in December 1960 (the artist was given as Elmo James). But it came out with E. James listed as the only songwriting credit. Unlike some other releases of James of that time such as "The Sky Is Crying" and "It Hurts Me Too", it was not a hit.

=== The Yardbirds cover ===
The work of Elmore James inspired a number of mid-1960s rock artists from Great Britain, and from North America as part of the "British Invasion", including the Yardbirds. One of the first tracks recorded by them with Jeff Beck on guitar, "I Ain't Done Wrong" appeared during the summer of 1965 on the For Your Love album in the United States and the Five Yardbirds EP in Britain. Although the sole writing credit for this track was given to the group's lead singer and harmonica player, Keith Relf, it was based on Kirkland's "I Must Have Done Somebody Wrong". Yardbirds drummer Jim McCarty later stated that "I Ain't Done Wrong" was "little more than a mildly revised version of an Elmore James number", and suggested that the credit to Relf was motivated by the group desiring to be more involved in doing their own songwriting and thus less dependent upon outside writers like Graham Gouldman. Beck plays slide guitar in a style somewhat akin to James's, and the track ended up in one of the Yardbirds' signature rave-ups.

=== David Clayton-Thomas cover ===
In 1966, David Clayton-Thomas was a blues singer working in the clubs of Toronto, in Canada. He recorded the album Sings Like It Is for Roman Records, which included "Done Somebody Wrong" with sole songwriting credit was given to "D. C. Thomas". As AllMusic later commented, it was essentially a reworking of the Elmore James "Done Somebody Wrong". In 1969, after Clayton-Thomas found fame with Blood, Sweat & Tears, the song was one of several reissued on an album by Decca Records with horns dubbed in to make it sound more like Blood, Sweat & Tears.)

=== Allman Brothers cover ===
When they were still teenagers in the early 1960s, brothers Duane and Gregg Allman were exposed to the song by Hank Moore, a local black musician who had a record out (as Hank Moore and his Orchestra) and who had opened shows for Hank Ballard & The Midnighters. Moore went to the Allmans' house in Daytona Beach, Florida, and used "Done Somebody Wrong" to illustrate how bass lines fit into the structure of music, and the stop/start rhythms that Elmore James used became one of the foundations of the Southern Rock genre that the Allman Brothers pioneered.

"Done Somebody Wrong" was on the setlist of several March 1971 shows the Allman Brothers Band were recording at New York's famous Fillmore East for their upcoming third album; the March 12 late show rendition was included on the album. The introduction by Duane Allman says this is a tune they have recently worked up, and characterizes it as "an old Elmore James song ... This is an old true story ..." Unlike some white rockers capitalizing on old blues tunes, the Allman Brothers were known for informing their audiences of the names of artists who had preceded them.

The interpretation is led by Duane Allman's slide guitar, described by one writer as a "tripwire-tight siren ". This is set against a shuffle rhythm, delivered by drummers Butch Trucks and Jaimoe and bassist Berry Oakley. Gregg Allman's vocal is remorseful, consistent with the song lyrics, and he plays electric piano on this number, rather than his usual Hammond B3 organ. The first solo is a harmonica break by band friend Thom Doucette, a blues harp player who frequently joined the Allman Brothers and played on several of the Fillmore East numbers. It is followed by a straight lead guitar break by Dickey Betts. After another verse, the band breaks out of the shuffle, and led by Duane Allman playing exceptionally high slide guitar notes, the band breaks into a triplet-based crescendo, with the harp part still involved, before returning the final vocal part and end. The Allmans' version of "Done Somebody Wrong" had not completely followed the Elmore James arrangement nor imitated his slide guitar playing. Indeed, writer Scott Freeman has said that Duane Allman's slide playing on this performance illustrated that he had gone well beyond whatever Elmore James and other blues masters had ever envisioned for the instrument.

The album At Fillmore East came out in July 1971 and received strong reviews, including for "Done Somebody Wrong". The album gave the band its big commercial breakthrough, and is generally regarded as one of the best live albums of all time. From the Fillmore shows on, "Done Somebody Wrong" became a part of the Allman Brothers' regular setlists, and performances of it have appeared on several historical releases from later in 1971, culminating with The Final Note.

Despite the deaths of band members Duane Allman and Berry Oakley, the band reached the height of their popular appeal during 1973. During shows of that year, "Done Somebody Wrong" was often featured at the front of setlists. Dickey Betts took over the slide parts, Gregg Allman moved out front to play rhythm guitar, and Chuck Leavell's piano solo replaced the original Doucette and Betts solos.

Later incarnations of the band continued to include the song in their repertoire, including a 2004 recording included on The Fox Box set release in 2017.

== Attributions and legacy ==
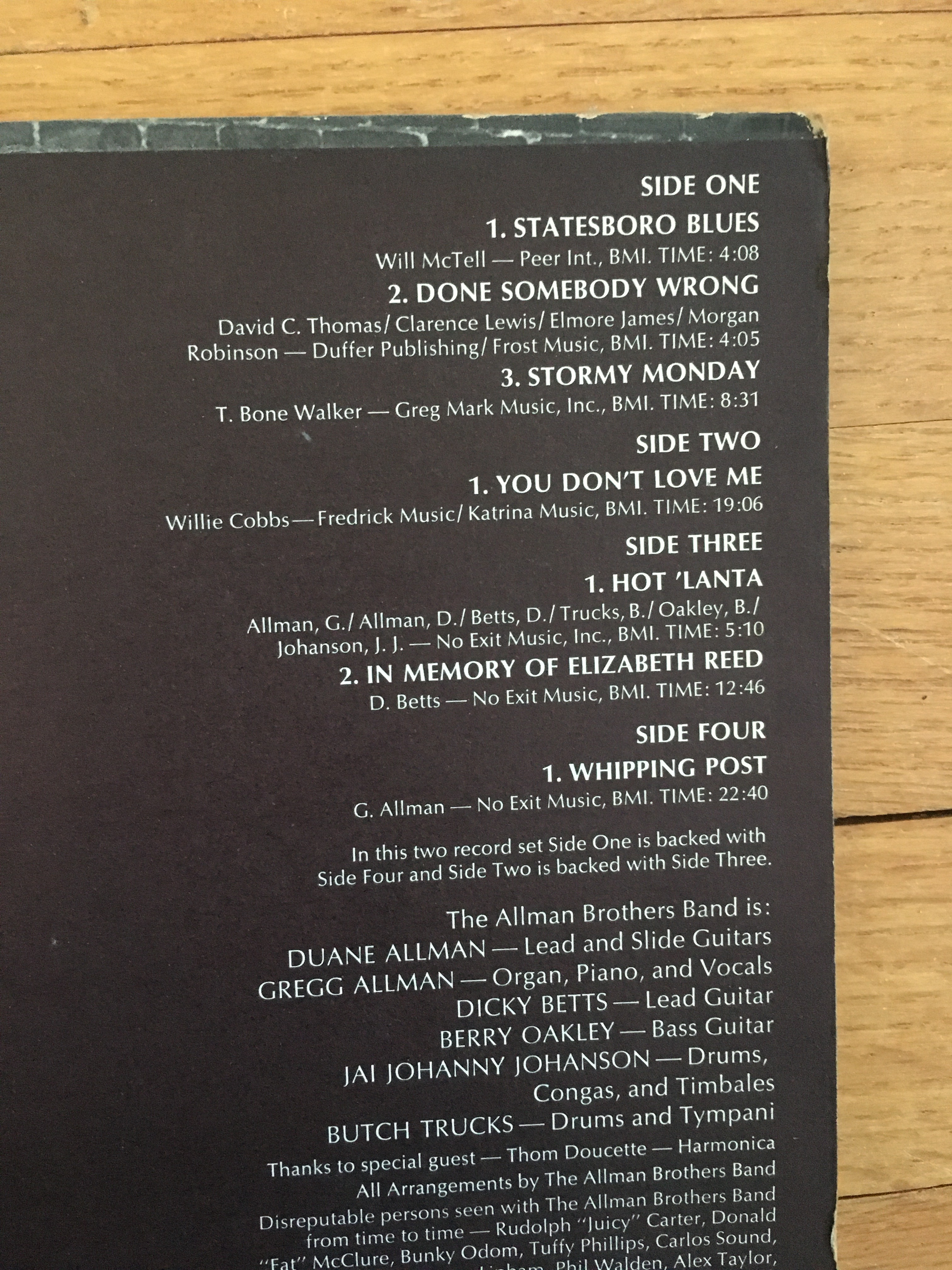
Song credits listed on the inside gatefold of the original The Allman Brothers Band At Fillmore East LP

The original vinyl double LP of At Fillmore East listed four writers for "Done Somebody Wrong": David C. Thomas, Clarence Lewis, Elmore James, and Morgan Robinson. The first was David Clayton-Thomas, included despite his 1966 recording having little or nothing to do with the Allman Brothers' arrangement. The last was Morgan "Bobby" Robinson, James' producer – he had writer or co-writer credits on some of James' other early records, although not originally on this one (Note: A 1960 U.S. copyright registration entry also only lists James: "w & m [words and music] Elmo James (Elmore James) @ Fast Music, Inc.") And Clarence "Fats" Lewis was a business associate of Robinson's (and not to be confused with the singer Clarence Lewis from the same period).

In later years, the song credits being used for "Done Somebody Wrong" changed again: James and Lewis remained, but Clayton-Thomas was dropped and Robinson was replaced by record company mogul Morris Levy. Levy had been another business associate of Robinson's, and became notorious for getting himself added into songwriting credits.

But none of these credits included the original writer of "I Must Have Done Somebody Wrong". Kirkland was one of many bluesman from the South who never quite found commercial success. In particular, he lamented that he had been unrewarded for his songwriting. As Kirkland would say in interviews, "[I wrote] 'Must Have Done Somebody Wrong,' which Elmore James stole from me and the Allman Brothers performed." Another time he expanded on the matter: "I've had a few songs stole from me, took from me, that people cut, and were made very popular. Like Elmore James, which I let him do one of my tunes, he didn't give me credit for it. In 1970 [actually 1971] the Allman Brothers got their first gold record, they recorded that same tune ... 'I Must've Done Somebody Wrong'. That's my tune. I let Elmore James cut it. See, I did it on a little small label [Fortune 848]. I knew it was a good song." As the Boston Globe wrote of one of these exchanges, "There's a twinge of bitterness in his voice, but no more so than most bluesmen of his era."

In 1997, Kirkland re-recorded the song for the Telarc album Lonely Street. Although "Done Somebody Wrong" is used as the title instead of his original, Kirkland is listed as the sole songwriter. The recording features contributions from guest musicians, including guitarists G. E. Smith and Cub Koda (on slide). Jaimoe, who played on the Allman Brothers Band's original rendition, contributes the drums. In a review, their performance is described as a highlight of the album.
