= Blue Sky (song) =

Song by the Allman Brothers Band

from the album Eat a Peach
- Released: February 12, 1972
- Recorded: September 1971 at Criteria Studios, Miami, Florida, U.S.
- Genre: Southern rock; country rock
- Length: 5:09
- Label: Capricorn
- Songwriter: Dickey Betts
- Producer: Tom Dowd

Official audio
- "Blue Sky" on YouTube

"Blue Sky" is a song by the American rock band the Allman Brothers Band from their third studio album, Eat a Peach (1972), released on Capricorn Records. The song was written and sung by guitarist Dickey Betts, who penned it about his girlfriend (and later wife), Sandy "Bluesky" Wabegijig. The track is also notable as one of guitarist Duane Allman's final recorded performances with the group. The band's two guitarists, Duane Allman and Dickey Betts, alternate playing the song's lead: Allman's solo beginning 1:07 in, Betts joining in a shared melody line at 2:28, followed by Betts's solo at 2:37. The song is notably more country-inspired than many songs in the band's catalogue.

== Background ==
Dickey Betts composed "Blue Sky" about his Indigenous Canadian girlfriend, Sandy "Bluesky" Wabegijig, whom he would later marry. The lyrics leave out any references to gender to make it nonspecific: "Once I got into the song I realized how nice it would be to keep the vernaculars—he and she—out and make it like you’re thinking of the spirit, like I was giving thanks for a beautiful day. I think that made it broader and more relatable to anyone and everyone," he later said.

Betts initially wanted the band's lead vocalist, Gregg Allman, to sing the song, but guitarist Duane Allman encouraged him to sing it himself: "Man, this is your song and it sounds like you and you need to sing it." He did, making his debut as a vocalist for the band,

An embryonic version of the song can be found on the fan bootleg, The Gatlinburg Tapes, a recording of the band jamming in April 1971 in Gatlinburg, Tennessee.

The song was one of Duane Allman's last recorded performances with the band. "As I mixed songs like "Blue Sky," I knew, of course, that I was listening to the last things that Duane ever played and there was just such a mix of beauty and sadness, knowing there's not going to be any more from him," said Johnny Sandlin.

== Live versions including Duane Allman ==
While Duane Allman died before Eat a Peach's release, the band played the song live several times before and after the album's studio version was recorded. Only one of these performances, recorded live during a September 19, 1971, concert at S.U.N.Y. Stonybrook, has been released by the band; several bootleg recordings from other shows circulate.

== Cover versions ==
"Blue Sky" has been covered by Joan Baez on her 1975 album Diamonds & Rust and released as the follow up single to the title track, reaching #57 on Billboard's Hot 100 Chart.

In 2018 singer and guitarist Frank Hannon, Dickey Betts' son-in-law, released a cover of "Blue Sky" featuring Betts' son Duane on guitar. The song, from the album entitled "From one place...to Another! Vol.1", reached #27 on Billboards Folk / Americana charts.

== Notes ==
=== Sources ===
- Paul, Alan (2014). One Way Out: The Inside History of the Allman Brothers Band. St. Martin's Press. ISBN 978-1250040497.
- Freeman, Scott (1996). Midnight Riders: The Story of the Allman Brothers Band. Little, Brown and Company. ISBN 978-0316294522.
- Allman, Gregg; Light, Alan (2012). My Cross to Bear. William Morrow. ISBN 978-0062112033.
