= Berry Oakley =

American bassist (1948–1972)

Background information
- Born: Raymond Berry Oakley III; April 4, 1948; Chicago, Illinois, U.S.
- Died: November 11, 1972 (aged 24) Macon, Georgia, U.S.
- Genres: Southern rock; blues; jam rock
- Occupation: Musician
- Instruments: Bass guitar; guitar; vocals
- Years active: 1964–1972
- Formerly of: The Allman Brothers Band

Raymond Berry Oakley III (April 4, 1948 – November 11, 1972) was an American bassist and one of the founding members of the Allman Brothers Band. Known for his long, melodic bass runs, he was ranked number 46 on Bass Player magazine's list of "The 100 Greatest Bass Players of All Time". He was posthumously inducted into the Rock and Roll Hall of Fame as a member of the Allman Brothers Band in 1995.

== Early life and career ==
Oakley was born in Chicago and raised in the suburb of Park Forest, Illinois. He attended Rich East High School. He then moved to Florida where he met and joined Dickey Betts' band, the Blues Messengers, later called Second Coming. He was a founding member of the Allman Brothers Band in 1969, along with guitarists Betts and Duane Allman, singer and keyboardist Gregg Allman, and drummers and percussionists Butch Trucks and Jai Johanny "Jaimoe" Johanson.

After Oakley’s passing, subsequent bassists for the Allman Brothers Band included Lamar Williams, David Goldflies, Allen Woody. and Oteil Burbridge.

== Death ==
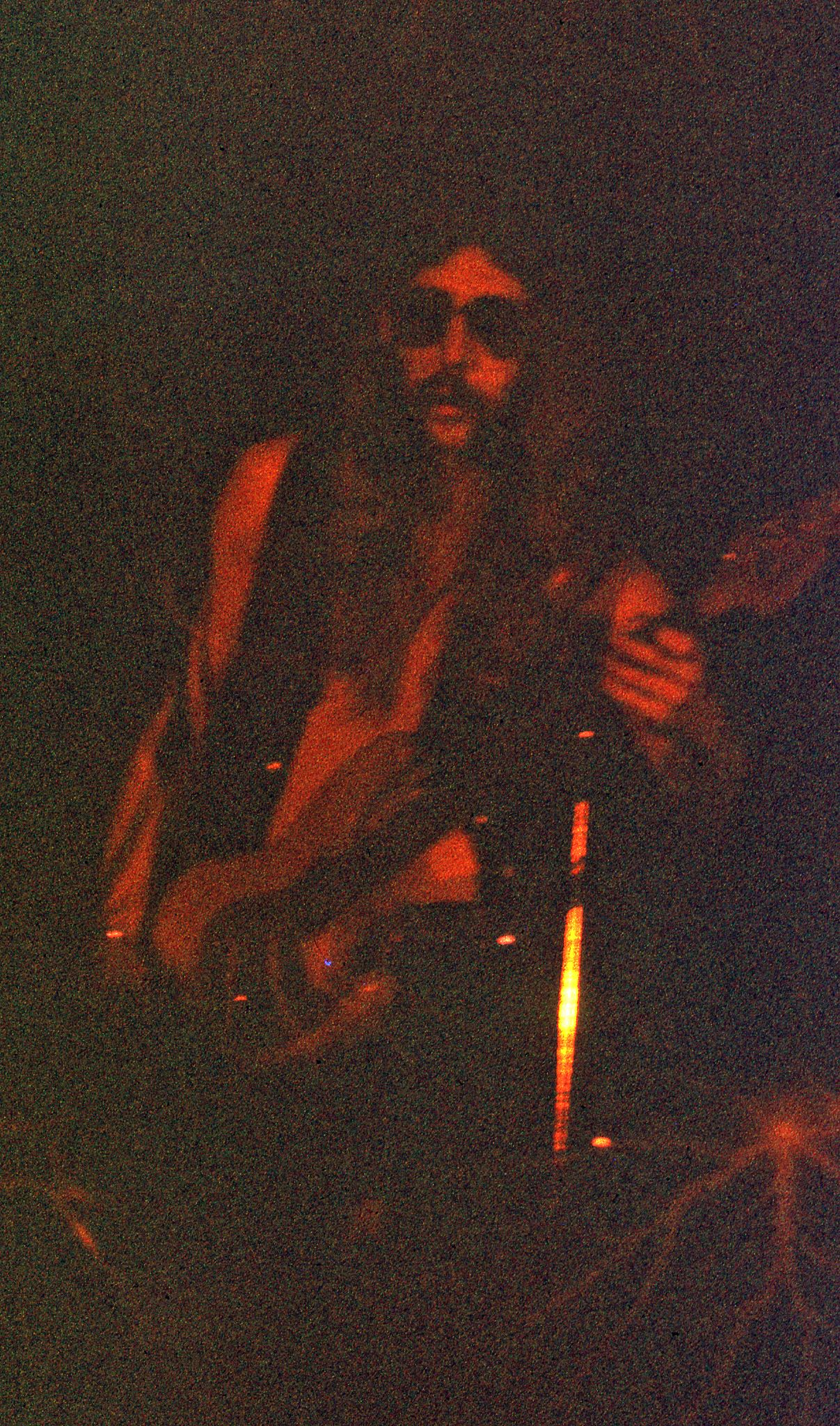
Oakley with the Allman Brothers in 1972

On November 11, 1972, Oakley was involved in a motorcycle accident in Macon, Georgia, a mere three blocks away from where Duane Allman had his fatal motorcycle accident the year before. Oakley was riding around a sharp right bend of the road on Napier Avenue at Inverness when he crossed the road’s center line and collided at an angle with a city bus rounding the bend from the opposite direction. After striking the front and then the back of the bus, Oakley was thrown from his motorcycle, just as Allman had been, and struck his head. Oakley declined medical treatment at the scene after the accident and caught a ride home. However, three hours later, he was rushed to the hospital, delirious and in pain, and died of cerebral swelling caused by a fractured skull. Attending doctors stated that even if Oakley had gone straight to the hospital from the scene of the accident, the extent of his injuries was so serious he could not have been saved. He was 24 years old when he died, the same age as Duane Allman.

== Legacy ==
In 1998, the Georgia State Legislature passed a resolution designating a bridge on State Highway 19/U.S. Route 41 in Macon, Georgia, as the "Raymond Berry Oakley III Bridge". At the same time, the road carried by the bridge was named Duane Allman Boulevard. The resolution stated that the names were designated "in honor and remembrance of the late founding members of the Allman Brothers Band."

== Equipment ==
Oakley's bass guitar, nicknamed "the Tractor Bass", was a Fender Jazz Bass with a Guild Bisonic bass pickup (manufactured by Hagström, a Swedish company).

== Discography ==
Contemporary albums

- The Allman Brothers Band (1969)
- Idlewild South (1970)
- At Fillmore East (1971)
- Eat a Peach (1972)
- Brothers and Sisters (1973)

Retrospective live albums

- Live at Ludlow Garage: 1970 (1990)
- Fillmore East, February 1970 (1996)
- American University 12/13/70 (2002)
- Live at the Atlanta International Pop Festival: July 3 & 5, 1970 (2003)
- S.U.N.Y. at Stonybrook: Stonybrook, NY 9/19/71 (2003)
- Macon City Auditorium: 2/11/72 (2004)
- Boston Common, 8/17/71 (2007)
- Live from A&R Studios (2016)
- Fillmore West '71 (2019)
- The Final Note (2020)
- Down in Texas '71 (2021)
- Syria Mosque (2022)
- Manley Field House, Syracuse University, April 7, 1972 (2024)
