= Duane Allman =

American guitarist (1946–1971)

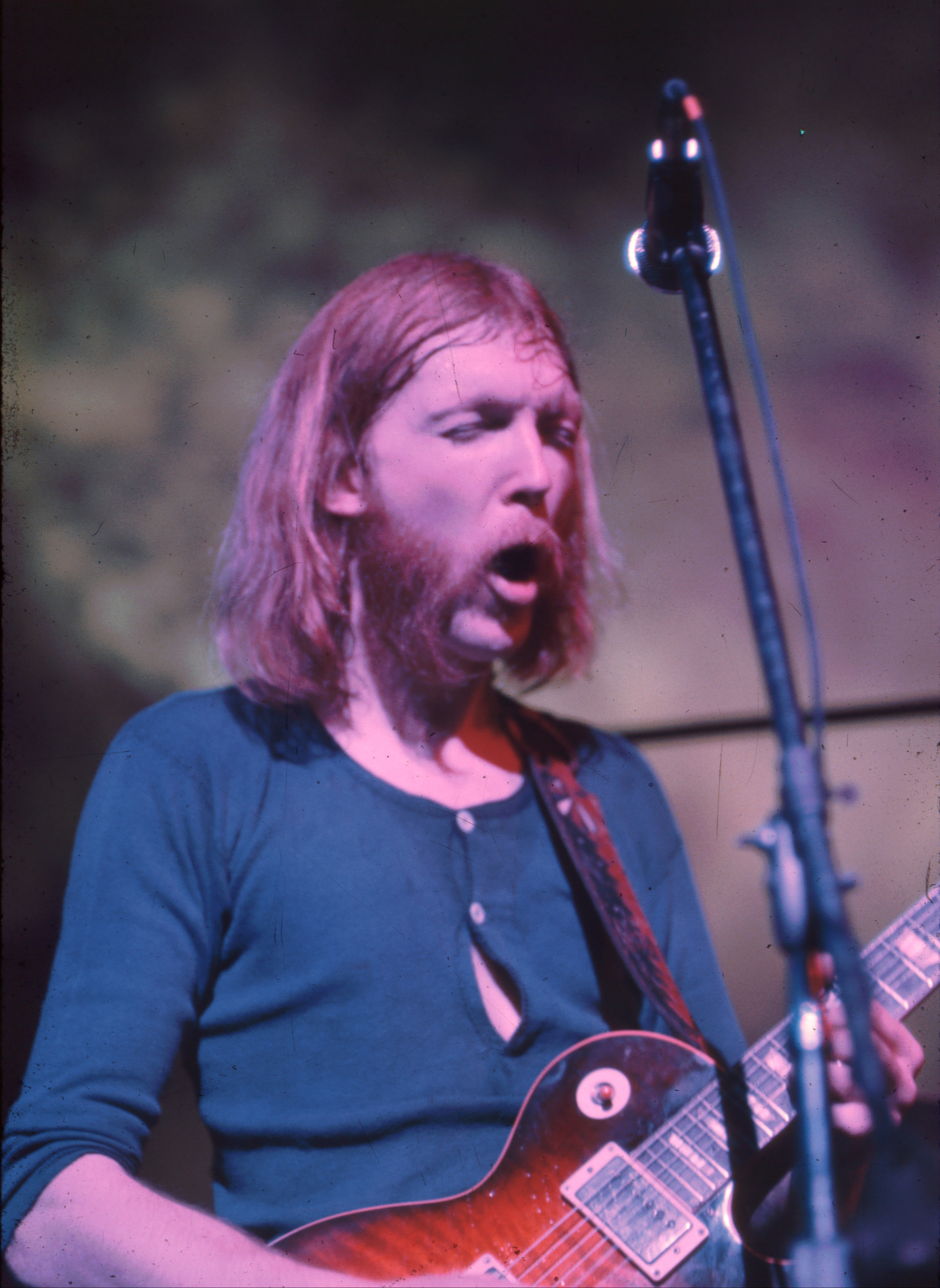
- Allman performing with The Allman Brothers Band at the Fillmore East in New York City, 1971

Background information
- Born: Howard Duane Allman; November 20, 1946; Nashville, Tennessee U.S.
- Died: October 29, 1971 (aged 24) Macon, Georgia, U.S.
- Genres: Blues; rock; jazz; jam; soul; Southern rock
- Occupation: Musician
- Instrument: Guitar
- Years active: 1961–1971
- Formerly of: The Allman Brothers Band; Hour Glass; The Allman Joys; Derek and the Dominos
- Website: allmanbrothersband.com

Howard Duane Allman (November 20, 1946 – October 29, 1971) was an American rock and blues guitarist and the founder and original leader of the Allman Brothers Band, for which he was posthumously inducted into the Rock and Roll Hall of Fame in 1995.

Born in Nashville, Tennessee, Allman began playing the guitar at age 14. He formed the Allman Brothers Band with his brother Gregg in Jacksonville, Florida, in 1969. The group achieved its greatest success in the early 1970s. Allman is best remembered for his brief but influential tenure in the band and in particular for his expressive slide guitar playing and inventive improvisational skills. A sought-after session musician both before and during his tenure with the band, Duane Allman performed with King Curtis, Aretha Franklin, Herbie Mann, Wilson Pickett, and Boz Scaggs. He also contributed to the only studio album by Derek and the Dominos, Layla and Other Assorted Love Songs (1970).

Allman died following a motorcycle crash on October 29, 1971, at the age of 24.

In 2003, he was ranked number 2 in Rolling Stone magazine's list of the 100 greatest guitarists of all time, second only to Jimi Hendrix. In 2011, he was ranked number 9 and in 2023 he was ranked 10th. His guitar tone (achieved with a Gibson Les Paul and two 50-watt bass Marshall amplifiers) was named one of the greatest of all time by Guitar Player.

== Early years ==
Duane Allman was born on November 20, 1946, in Nashville, Tennessee. He was the elder son of Willis Allman (1918–1949) who, at the time of his death, was a second lieutenant on active duty in the United States Army, having served as an Army non-commissioned officer during World War II; and Geraldine Allman (née Robbins) (1917–2015). His brother, Gregg, was born on December 8, 1947.

On December 26, 1949, when the family was living near Norfolk, Virginia, where he was stationed, Willis Allman was murdered during an armed robbery by Michael Robert "Buddy" Green (1923–2024), an Army veteran that Allman and another recruiting officer had befriended earlier that day. Green was captured, convicted, sentenced and paroled in 1972. So that she could retrain as an accountant, Geraldine "Mama A" Allman sent Duane and Gregg to Castle Heights Military Academy in Lebanon, Tennessee, which they both disliked intensely. In 1957, the family moved to Daytona Beach, Florida, where the boys attended Seabreeze High School.

The boys returned to Nashville to spend summers with their grandmother, and there Gregg learned guitar basics from a neighbor. In 1960, he had saved enough money to buy his first guitar, a Japanese-made Teisco Silvertone, while Duane acquired a Harley 165 motorbike. Despite Duane being left-handed, he played the guitar right-handed. Duane began to take an interest in the guitar, and the boys would sometimes fight over it, until Duane wrecked the motorbike and traded it for a Silvertone of his own. His mother eventually bought Duane a Gibson Les Paul Junior.

It was also in Nashville that the boys became musically inspired by a rhythm-and-blues concert where they saw blues guitarist B.B. King perform. Duane told Gregg, "We got to get into this." Duane learned to play very quickly and soon became the better guitarist of the two.

== Career ==
=== 1961–1968: Allman Joys and Hour Glass ===
The brothers started playing publicly in 1961, joining or forming a number of local groups. Around this time, Duane left school to focus on his guitar playing. His early band The Escorts opened for the Beach Boys in 1965 but disbanded, some of its members eventually forming the Allman Joys. After Gregg graduated from Seabreeze High School in 1965, the Allman Joys went on the road, performing throughout the Southeast, and eventually were based in Nashville. The Allman Joys became Hour Glass and moved to Los Angeles in early 1967. There Hour Glass recorded two albums for Liberty Records, but the band was unsatisfied. Liberty tried to market them as a pop band, ignoring the band's desire to play more blues-oriented material. Hour Glass broke up in early 1968. Duane and Gregg went back to Florida, where they played on demo sessions with The 31st of February, a folk rock outfit whose drummer was Butch Trucks. Gregg returned to California to fulfill Hour Glass obligations, while Duane jammed around Florida for months but did not get another band going.

Duane began to learn to play slide guitar on his birthday in 1968. He was recovering from an injury to his left elbow, suffered in a fall from a horse. Gregg brought him a birthday present, the debut album by Taj Mahal, and a bottle of Coricidin pills. He left them on the front porch and rang the bell, as Duane was angry with him about the injury. "About two hours after I left, my phone rang," Gregg recalled. "'Baby brother, baby brother, get over here now!'" Duane had poured the pills out of the Coricidin bottle, washed off the label and was using it as a slide to play along with the album track "Statesboro Blues" (on the recording, the slide guitar is played by Jesse Ed Davis). "Duane had never played slide before," Gregg later said, but "he just picked it up and started burnin'. He was a natural." The song became a part of the Allman Brothers Band's repertoire, and Duane's slide guitar became crucial to their sound. Because of his use of the early-1970s-era Coricidin medicine bottle, which is no longer manufactured, replica Coricidin bottles are now popular with slide guitar players who like its glassy feel and sound.

=== 1966–1969: Session musician ===
Allman's first major recording session occurred in early 1966 at Nashville's RCA Studio B, two years before his famed tenure at Muscle Shoals' FAME Studios. Producer Tony Moon was recording The Vogues' first album after his song "5 O'Clock World" had reached the top 5, and had been recorded in that same studio. He hired Allman to play on several sides, as he wanted a more rock sound. At the time, The Allman Joys were the house band at The Briar Patch in Nashville. Allman's playing on the two Hour Glass albums and an Hour Glass session in early 1968 at FAME Studios in Muscle Shoals, Alabama, caught the ear of Rick Hall, owner of FAME. In November 1968 Hall bought Allman's contract for $10,000. Allman, tired of the studio limitation, was able to play on his first album as a sessions ace with Wilson Pickett. Allman's work on that album, Hey Jude (1968), got him hired as a full-time session musician at Muscle Shoals and brought him to the attention of other musicians, notably Eric Clapton, who later said, "I remember hearing Wilson Pickett's 'Hey Jude' and just being astounded by the lead break at the end. I had to know who that was immediately—right now."

Allman's performance on "Hey Jude" impressed Atlantic Records producer and executive Jerry Wexler when Hall played it over the phone for him. Wexler immediately bought Allman's recording contract from Hall and wanted to use him on sessions with Atlantic R&B artists. While at Muscle Shoals, Allman played on recordings by numerous artists, including Clarence Carter, King Curtis, Aretha Franklin, Laura Nyro, Wilson Pickett, Otis Rush, Percy Sledge, Johnny Jenkins, Boz Scaggs, Delaney & Bonnie, Doris Duke and jazz flautist Herbie Mann. For his first sessions with Franklin, Allman traveled to New York where, in January 1969, he went as an audience member to the Fillmore East to see Johnny Winter and told Muscle Shoals guitarist Jimmy Johnson that in a year he would be on that stage. That December, the Allman Brothers Band indeed played the Fillmore. Coincidentally, the Fillmore East performances recorded for the Allman Brothers album At Fillmore East in March 1971—often considered the high water mark for the band—were on the same bill as Johnny Winter.

=== 1968: Formation of the Allman Brothers Band ===
When asked how the band came together Duane stated: "Very slowly. I was in Muscle Shoals and I went down to Jacksonville and was jamming with Berry and Dickey. Jaimoe came with me from Muscle Shoals; he's originally from Macon. Gregg was in California and Butch was in Jacksonville where we all got together and jammed for a couple of months putting together songs and stuff. We just needed a singer and Gregg was the guy. Two weeks after Gregg got back from California we went up to New York and recorded there. We played live gigs before our first album was released in November [of 1969]."

While visiting St. Louis, Allman met Donna Roosman, who bore his second child, Galadrielle. The couple's relationship soon ended. He had an earlier relationship with Patti Chandlee which resulted in the birth of a daughter who was born deaf.

=== 1969–1971: Success with Layla and At Fillmore East ===
The Allman Brothers Band went on to become one of the most influential rock groups of the 1970s. George Kimball, writing in Rolling Stone in 1971, described the group as "the best damn rock and roll band this country has produced in the past five years." After months of nonstop rehearsing and gigging without Gregg, including free shows in Central City Park in Macon and Piedmont Park in Atlanta, all they needed was a singer/organist and Duane knew who he wanted. When Gregg got back from California the group settled on the name of the band and was ready to record. Their debut album, The Allman Brothers Band, was recorded in New York in September 1969 and released a few months later. In the midst of intense touring, work began in Macon and Miami (at Atlantic South–Criteria Studios), and a little bit in New York, on the band's second album, Idlewild South. Produced mostly by Tom Dowd, Idlewild South was released in August 1970 and broke new ground for them by getting into the Billboard charts.

After a concert in Miami, in August, watched by Eric Clapton and the other members of Derek and the Dominos, the two bands went back to Criteria Studios in Miami, where the Dominoes were recording Layla and Other Assorted Love Songs. Members of both bands jammed, after which Allman and Clapton stayed up all night trading and showing one another favorite licks, discovering they had a deep and instinctive rapport. Allman participated in the recording of most of the album's tracks, contributing some of his best-known work. He never left the Allman Brothers Band, though, despite being offered a permanent position with Clapton. Allman never toured with Derek and the Dominos, but he did make at least two appearances with them, on December 1, 1970, at the Curtis Hixon Hall in Tampa (Soulmates LP), and on the following day at Onondaga County War Memorial in Syracuse, New York. It is unclear whether he also appeared with them on November 20, 1970, at the Santa Monica Civic Auditorium when guitarist Delaney Bramlett performed with the band.

In an interview, Allman told listeners how to tell who played what: Clapton played the Fender parts and Allman the Gibson parts. He continued by noting that the Fender had a sparklier sound, while the Gibson produced more of a "full-tilt screech". Clapton wrote later in his autobiography that he and Allman were inseparable during the sessions in Florida; he talked about Allman as the "musical brother I'd never had but wished I did."

The Allman Brothers went on to record At Fillmore East in March 1971. Meanwhile, Allman continued contributing session work to other artists' albums whenever he could. According to Skydog: The Duane Allman Story, he would spontaneously drop in at recording sessions and contribute to whatever was being taped that day. He received cash payments but no recording credits, making it virtually impossible to compile a complete discography of his works.

Allman was well known for his melodic, extended and attention-holding guitar solos. During this period two of his stated influences were Miles Davis and John Coltrane. He said that he had listened intently to Davis's Kind of Blue for two years.

As Allman's distinctive electric bottleneck sound began to mature, it evolved into the musical voice of what would come to be known as Southern rock, being picked up by other slide guitarists, including his bandmate Dickey Betts (after Allman's death), Derek Trucks, Gary Rossington of Lynyrd Skynyrd, and Joe Walsh. Duane also taught a young Joe Walsh to play slide.

Twice Duane jammed with the Grateful Dead, both at the Fillmore East. On February 11, 1970 Duane and Gregg joined the Dead for "Dark Star" and "Turn On Your Lovelight", and on April 26, 1971 Duane joined in on "Sugar Magnolia", "It Hurts Me Too", and "Beat It On Down the Line".

== Personal life ==
Allman had a daughter, Galadrielle Allman, with Donna Roosman in 1969. In 2014, Galadrielle Allman published a reflection on her father, mother, family, and the culture of the 1960s, called Please Be with Me: A Song for My Father.

== Death ==
On October 29, 1971, while the band was on a break from touring and recording, Allman was riding his Harley-Davidson Sportster motorcycle at high speed on Hillcrest Avenue, in the western part of Macon, Georgia. As he approached Bartlett Street, a flatbed boom truck stopped suddenly in the intersection, forcing him to swerve sharply. He struck either the back of the truck or the ball on the crane and was thrown from the motorcycle, which landed on top of him and skidded another 90 feet (27 m) with him pinned underneath it, crushing his internal organs. He was alive when he arrived at a hospital, but despite immediate medical treatment, he died several hours later from massive internal injuries. Allman's death occurred shortly after the release and initial success of At Fillmore East.

=== Memorial ===
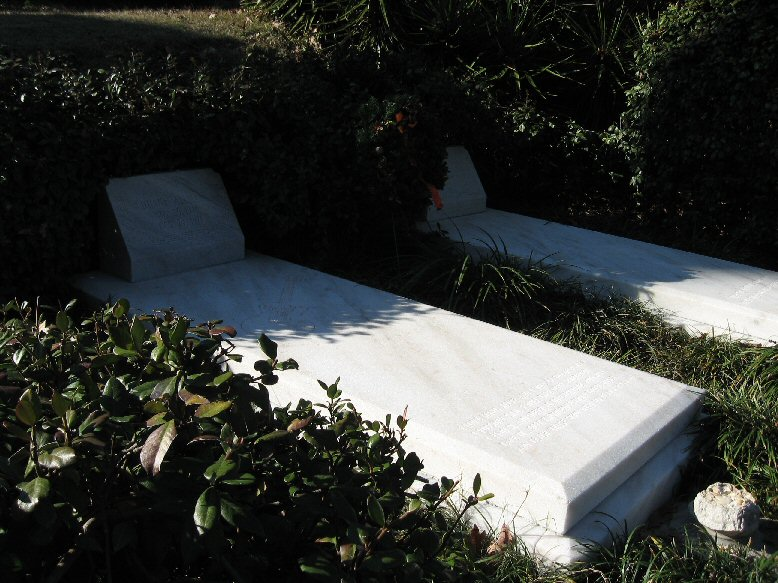
The graves of Duane Allman and Berry Oakley

Allman's funeral service was held on Monday, November 1, 1971, at Snow's Memorial Chapel in Macon, Georgia. In the chapel, packed with family and friends, many of the musicians who had been part of Allman's life were in attendance to mourn his death. Record producer Jerry Wexler gave the eulogy. Wexler praised Allman's musical achievements; his uncompromising dedication to Southern gospel, country, and blues music; and the place he attained alongside the great black musicians and blues singers from the South. The band, joined by others, played several tunes, concluding with a group rendition of the Southern spiritual "Will the Circle Be Unbroken", a band favorite.

== Legacy ==
After Allman's funeral and some weeks of mourning, the five surviving members of the Allman Brothers Band carried on, resuming live performances and finishing the recording work interrupted by Allman's death. They named their next album Eat a Peach for Allman's response to an interviewer's question: "How are you helping the revolution?" Allman replied, "I'm hitting a lick for peace, and every time I'm in Georgia I eat a peach for peace. But you can't help the revolution, because there's just evolution. I'm a player. And players don't give a damn for nothing but playing...." Released as a double album in February 1972, it contains a side of live and studio tracks with Allman, two sides of "Mountain Jam", recorded with Allman at the same time as At Fillmore East in March, and a side of tracks by the surviving five members of the band.

Allman Brothers Band bassist Berry Oakley died less than 13 months later, also at the age of 24, in a similar motorcycle crash with a city bus, three blocks from the site of Allman's fatal accident. Oakley was buried beside Allman in Rose Hill Cemetery in Macon, Georgia.

The variety of Allman's session work and Allman Brothers Band bandleading can be heard to good effect on two posthumous Capricorn releases, An Anthology (1972) and An Anthology Vol. II (1974). There are also several archival releases of live Allman Brothers Band performances from what the band called "Duane's era".

"Remember Duane Allman" tribute, carved into an excavation face next to Interstate 20 in 1973

Shortly after Allman's death, Ronnie Van Zant of Lynyrd Skynyrd dedicated the song "Free Bird" to Allman's memory. Van Zant would sometimes allude to this in concert; in the band's 1976 performance of "Free Bird" in Knebworth, England, Van Zant said to pianist Billy Powell, "Play it for Duane Allman." The song was written well before Allman died and was not written with him in mind. (Allen Collins wrote the song after his then girlfriend asked him the question "if I leave here tomorrow, would you still remember me?")

In 1973, four boys who were Hinds Junior College students living in Vicksburg, Mississippi, carved the very large letters "REMEMBER DUANE ALLMAN" into a vertical excavation face beside Interstate Highway 20 between Vicksburg and the school's campus in Raymond on the route they travelled together while commuting between their homes and campus. A photograph was published in Rolling Stone magazine and in the Rolling Stone Illustrated History of Rock & Roll; the carving lasted for over 10 years.

In 1998, the Georgia State Legislature passed a resolution designating a stretch of State Highway 19, U.S. Route 41, within Macon, as Duane Allman Boulevard in his honor. The route, which passes near the Allman Brothers Band Museum (at "The Big House", where the band once lived) and the H&H Restaurant, where the band members often dined, crosses the Raymond Berry Oakley III Bridge.

Country singer Travis Tritt, in the song "Put Some Drive in Your Country" on his debut album, sings "Now I still love old country / I ain't tryin' to put it down / But damn I miss Duane Allman / I wish he was still around."

Skydog, a seven-CD box set tracing the virtuosity of Allman on the guitar, was released in 2013 with the help of his daughter, Galadrielle Allman. A March 16 interview with her on NPR's Weekend Edition Saturday by Scott Simon runs over eight minutes, includes many details, and is highlighted with clips of his playing, including links to an audio file prepared for the broadcast.

Duane Allman was inducted into the Rock and Roll Hall of Fame in 1995 as a member of the Allman Brothers Band.

== Playing style ==
Allman is widely considered one of the greatest guitarists of all time. Guitar World described Allman as having "razor-sharp articulation and masterful touch" and cited the "smoldering slow blues" of tracks like "Stormy Monday" and "the fiery, aggressive solos" of "Whipping Post" and "You Don't Love Me" as highlights of his playing. The magazine also credited Allman with a "keen understanding of economy" in his phrasing, which allowed Allman to play extended guitar solos that always remained enjoyable to listen to. Allman's playing is also noted for his mastery of slide guitar, despite having only begun playing slide a year before the Allman Brothers Band's debut release. His brother Gregg Allman described him as a "natural" playing slide, which he did with a Coricidin bottle on his ring finger. Allman preferred open tunings like open E (E-B-E-G#-B-E) when playing slide. Early on, he would re-tune his Gibson Les Paul between songs when needed; this lasted until bandmate Dickey Betts gifted Allman a 1961 Gibson SG/Les Paul Standard that Allman then used exclusively for slide work.

As co-founders of the Allman Brothers Band, Allman and Betts employed a unique co-lead style of playing in contrast to the traditional rhythm and lead roles of rock guitar. Their playing heavily featured harmony lines, counterpoints, unison melodies, and extended solos, with songs like "Blue Sky" and "In Memory of Elizabeth Reed" often cited as standout examples of their combined style. Their harmonies, however, were not the result of careful planning; rather, they happened spontaneously, with Betts often starting a melody and Allman improvising off of him. Warren Haynes noted that much of the "magic" of the Allman/Betts dichotomy stemmed from their willingness to make mistakes and that as a result a lot their note choices were not always "correct" from a technical perspective.

== Equipment ==
Allman's first electric guitar was a red 1959 Gibson Les Paul Junior, which was followed shortly by a Fender Telecaster modified with a Stratocaster neck. In 1968 or early 1969, Allman bought a 1957 Les Paul goldtop (serial #7 3312) from Lipham Music in Gainsville, Florida, and he would go on to use it on multiple recordings at the time, including on Derek and the Dominos' "Layla." Allman traded the goldtop (plus $200 and a Marshall amp) in September of 1969 for a 1959 plain-top sunburst Les Paul—although Allman had a roadie transfer over the goldtop's pickups. Other guitars Allman acquired included a dot-neck sunburst Gibson ES-335 (dated between 1958 and 1962) and a tobacco sunburst Les Paul he obtained in June 1971. Much of his session work was performed with a three-tone sunburst 1961 Strat, while his slide work was done on an SG/Les Paul Standard given to him by bandmate Dickey Betts. This SG, which was eventually bought by Graham Nash, was sold at auction in 2019 for $591,000.

Allman's first amplifier was a Vox Super Beatle with six 10" speakers and two horns. This was replaced with a Fender Twin Reverb, which he preferred for session work. With the Allman Brothers Band, Allman favored two Marshall 50-watt heads paired with two Marshall 4x12 cabinets loaded with JBL D-120F speakers. He also used a Maestro Echoplex.

== Discography ==
The Allman Brothers Band

- The Allman Brothers Band (1969)
- Idlewild South (1970)
- At Fillmore East (1971)
- Eat a Peach (1972) on tracks 4–9

Derek & the Dominos

- Layla and Other Assorted Love Songs (1970) on tracks 4–14

== See also ==
- List of deaths by motorcycle crash
