= Skydog: The Duane Allman Retrospective =

Compilation album by Duane Allman
- Released: March 2013
- Recorded: 1965 – 1971
- Genres: Rock, blues, R&B, soul
- Label: Rounder

Duane Allman chronology
An Anthology Vol. II (1974)	Skydog: The Duane Allman Retrospective (2013)

Skydog: The Duane Allman Retrospective is an album by guitarist Duane Allman. Comprising seven CDs and packaged as a box set, it is a compilation of songs by various artists recorded during Allman's brief but prolific career. It includes tracks recorded from 1965 to 1971 – with his early groups, as a session musician, and as a member of the Allman Brothers Band. It was released in 2013.

The compilation was produced by Bill Levenson and Galadrielle Allman. Levenson won a Grammy Award for Best Historical Album in 1989 for producing the Eric Clapton box set Crossroads. Galadrielle Allman is the daughter of Duane Allman and author of the memoir Please Be with Me.

Of the 129 tracks on the album, nine were previously unreleased.

In 2016 the box set was released on vinyl, on 14 LPs, in a limited edition of 1,000 copies.

== Critical reception ==
On AllMusic, Stephen Thomas Erlewine said, "Much of the greatness in Skydog lies in its thoroughness, how it treats Allman's work outside of the Allman Brothers Band not as a digression but rather a focus.... This is an epic narrative illustrating how soul, blues, country, psychedelia, jazz, and garage rock melded into modern rock & roll and, in turn, this is a biography of a musician who was instrumental in that evolution, a guitarist whose name is well-known but whose work is still not thoroughly appreciated. Skydog rights that wrong in glorious fashion."

In Blues Blast Magazine James Walker wrote, "Dying in a motorcycle accident at the age of 24, Duane had an effective studio career of 3 – 5 years. In that short time, he left a body of work with irreplaceable contributions to studio recordings by Eric Clapton, Wilson Pickett, Aretha Franklin, Boz Scaggs, Clarence Carter, King Curtis, Delaney & Bonnie, John Hammond Jr., and many more, including, of course, the Allman Brothers Band."

In the Seattle Post-Intelligencer Glen Boyd said, "Today, Duane Allman is of course best remembered as [a member of] the Allman Brothers Band – the trailblazing, Georgia based blues-rock outfit who – with apologies to Lynyrd Skynyrd – more or less invented the Southern rock genre. But what is slightly less known about Duane Allman, is the mind-boggling number of great records he played on outside of his much better known band."

In American Songwriter Hal Horowitz wrote, "[Skydog] meticulously and in chronological order follows the elder (by a year) Allman brother's musical path from his early psychedelic / Brit invasion roots in the mid-'60s through his stellar work at Muscle Shoals backing soul legends such as Wilson Pickett, Arthur Conley and Clarence Carter, his collaboration as Eric Clapton's sideman in Derek and the Dominos and of course his years leading the Allman Brothers Band. The book of copious historical liner notes, rare photos and detailed track notation reflects the deluxe nature of the project..."

In All About Jazz C. Michael Bailey said, "Sprawling best describes the range of this retrospective, but it always comes back to the central issue, the paramount talent of a 24-year old guitarist who changed the way music was played in so many ways. Allman may be considered the pioneer of the electric slide guitar. What Son House, Robert Johnson and Elmore James began, Duane Allman perfected and Lowell George, Sonny Landreth and Derek Trucks expanded."

== Track listing ==
Disc one

1. The Escorts – "Turn On Your Love Light" – 2:33 (Note: Previously unreleased)
2. The Escorts – "No Name Instrumental" – 3:13
3. The Escorts – "What'd I Say" – 4:04
4. The Allman Joys – "Spoonful" – 2:27
5. The Allman Joys – "Gotta Get Away" – 2:38
6. The Allman Joys – "Shapes of Things" – 2:47
7. The Allman Joys – "Crossroads" – 3:32
8. The Allman Joys – "Mister, You're a Better Man Than I" – 4:45
9. The Allman Joys – "Lost Woman" – 5:23
10. Hour Glass – "Cast Off All My Fears" – 3:31
11. Hour Glass – "I've Been Trying" – 2:39
12. Hour Glass – "Nothing but Tears" – 2:29
13. Hour Glass – "Power of Love" – 2:51
14. Hour Glass – "Down in Texas" – 3:08
15. Hour Glass – "Norwegian Wood (This Bird Has Flown)" – 3:01
16. Hour Glass – B.B. King Medley: "Sweet Little Angel" / "It's My Own Fault" / "How Blue Can You Get?" – 7:07
17. Hour Glass – "Been Gone Too Long" – 3:03
18. Hour Glass – "Ain't No Good To Cry" – 3:08
19. 31st of February – "Morning Dew" – 3:46
20. 31st of February – "Melissa" – 3:12
21. The Bleus – "Milk and Honey" – 2:34
22. The Bleus – "Leavin' Lisa" – 2:43
23. The Bleus – "Julianna's Gone" – 2:59

Disc two

1. Clarence Carter – "The Road of Love" – 2:54
2. Clarence Carter – "Light My Fire" – 2:49
3. Wilson Pickett – "Hey Jude" – 4:06
4. Wilson Pickett – "Toe Hold" – 2:49
5. Wilson Pickett – "My Own Style of Loving" – 2:41
6. Wilson Pickett – "Born to Be Wild" – 2:45
7. Laura Lee – "It's How You Make It Good" – 2:32
8. Laura Lee – "It Ain't What You Do (But How You Do It)" – 2:05
9. Spencer Wiggins – "I Never Loved a Woman (The Way I Love You)" – 3:01
10. Arthur Conley – "Ob-La-Di, Ob-La-Da" – 3:00
11. Arthur Conley – "Stuff You Gotta Watch" – 2:15
12. Arthur Conley – "Speak Her Name" – 2:39
13. Arthur Conley – "That Can't Be My Baby" – 2:22
14. Willie Walker – "A Lucky Loser" – 2:20
15. The Lovelles – "I'm Coming Today" – 2:59
16. The Lovelles – "Pretending Dear" – 2:38
17. Aretha Franklin – "The Weight" – 2:53
18. Aretha Franklin – "It Ain't Fair" – 3:22
19. Soul Survivors – "Darkness" – 2:56
20. Soul Survivors– "Tell Daddy" – 2:30
21. Soul Survivors – "Got Down on Saturday" – 3:10
22. King Curtis – "Hey Joe" – 2:56
23. King Curtis – "Foot Pattin'" – 4:49
24. King Curtis – "Games People Play" – 2:46
25. King Curtis – "The Weight" – 2:47
26. The Sweet Inspirations – "Get a Little Order" – 2:06

Disc three

1. The Barry Goldberg Blues Band – "Twice a Man" – 4:26
2. Duane Allman – "Goin' Down Slow" – 8:44
3. Duane Allman – "No Money Down" – 3:25
4. Duane Allman – "Happily Married Man" – 2:40
5. Otis Rush – "Me" – 2:55
6. Otis Rush – "Reap What You Sow" – 4:53
7. Otis Rush – "It Takes Time" – 3:25
8. The Duck and the Bear – "Going Up the Country" – 2:34
9. The Duck and the Bear – "Hand Jive" – 2:41
10. Boz Scaggs – "Finding Her" – 4:10
11. Boz Scaggs – "Look What I Got" – 4:13
12. Boz Scaggs – "Waiting for a Train" – 2:41
13. Boz Scaggs – "Loan Me a Dime" – 13:01
14. The Allman Brothers Band – "Don't Want You No More" – 2:26
15. The Allman Brothers Band – "It's Not My Cross to Bear" – 5:01
16. The Allman Brothers Band – "Black Hearted Woman" – 5:07
17. The Allman Brothers Band – "Trouble No More" – 3:45

Disc four

1. The Allman Brothers Band – "Every Hungry Woman" – 4:13
2. The Allman Brothers Band – "Dreams" – 7:16
3. The Allman Brothers Band – "Whipping Post" – 5:16
4. Ronnie Hawkins – "One More Night" – 2:22
5. Ronnie Hawkins – "Will the Circle Be Unbroken" – 2:50
6. Ronnie Hawkins – "Matchbox" – 3:05
7. Ronnie Hawkins – "Down in the Alley" – 5:08
8. Ronnie Hawkins – "Who Do You Love" – 2:13
9. Lulu – "Marley Purt Drive" – 3:21
10. Lulu – "Dirty Old Man" – 2:20
11. Lulu – "Mr. Bojangles" – 3:08
12. Lulu – "Sweep Around Your Own Back Door" – 2:40
13. Johnny Jenkins – "I Walk on Gilded Splinters" – 5:16
14. Johnny Jenkins – "Rollin' Stone" – 4:56
15. Johnny Jenkins – "Down Along the Cove" – 3:02
16. Johnny Jenkins – "Voodoo in You" – 4:50
17. John Hammond – "Shake for Me" – 2:42
18. John Hammond – "Cryin' for My Baby" – 2:39
19. John Hammond – "I'm Leavin' You" – 3:20
20. John Hammond – "You'll Be Mine" – 2:42
21. Doris Duke – "Ghost of Myself" – 3:06

Disc five

1. Eric Quincy Tate – "Comin' Down" (demo version) – 2:52
2. The Allman Brothers Band – "Hoochie Coochie Man" (live) – 5:00
3. The Allman Brothers Band – "Midnight Rider" – 2:58
4. The Allman Brothers Band – "Dimples" (live) – 4:59
5. The Allman Brothers Band – "I'm Gonna Move to the Outskirts of Town" (live) – 9:21
6. Delaney & Bonnie and Friends – "Soul Shake" – 3:06
7. Laura Nyro – "Beads of Sweat" – 4:47
8. The Allman Brothers Band – "Don't Keep Me Wonderin'" – 3:28
9. Delaney & Bonnie and Friends – "Living on the Open Road" – 3:03
10. Ella Brown – "A Woman Left Lonely" – 3:23
11. Ella Brown – "Touch Me" – 2:59
12. Bobby Lance – "More than Enough Rain" – 5:51
13. Derek and the Dominos – "I Am Yours" – 3:34
14. Derek and the Dominos – "Why Does Love Got to Be So Sad?" – 4:41
15. Derek and the Dominos – "Have You Ever Loved a Woman" – 6:52
16. Derek and the Dominos– "Layla" – 7:03
17. Eric Clapton & Duane Allman – "Mean Old World" – 3:48

Disc six

1. Sam Samudio – "Me and Bobby McGee" – 3:31
2. Sam Samudio – "Relativity" – 3:14
3. Sam Samudio – "Goin' Upstairs" – 5:06
4. Ronnie Hawkins – "Don't Tell Me Your Troubles" – 2:13
5. Ronnie Hawkins – "Sick and Tired" – 2:45
6. Ronnie Hawkins – "Odessa" – 3:19
7. Delaney & Bonnie and Friends – "Gift of Love" – 2:09
8. Delaney & Bonnie and Friends – "Sing My Way Home" – 4:02
9. The Allman Brothers Band – "Statesboro Blues" (live) – 4:17
10. The Allman Brothers Band – "In Memory of Elizabeth Reed" (live) – 13:04
11. Grateful Dead – "Sugar Magnolia" (live) – 7:20
12. The Allman Brothers Band – "One Way Out" (live) – 4:57
13. Herbie Mann – "Push Push" – 10:03
14. Herbie Mann – "Spirit in the Dark" – 7:59
15. Herbie Mann – "What'd I Say" – 4:57

Disc seven

1. Delaney & Bonnie and Friends – "Come On in My Kitchen" (live) – 3:42
2. Delaney & Bonnie and Friends – "Going Down the Road Feeling Bad" (live) – 4:03
3. Delaney & Bonnie and Friends – "Poor Elijah" / "Tribute to Johnson" (live) – 4:52
4. The Allman Brothers Band – "You Don't Love Me" / "Soul Serenade" (live) – 19:25
5. Cowboy – "Please Be with Me" – 3:41
6. The Allman Brothers Band – "Stand Back" – 3:24
7. The Allman Brothers Band – "Blue Sky" – 5:09
8. The Allman Brothers Band – "Blue Sky" (live) – 11:22
9. The Allman Brothers Band – "Dreams" (live) – 17:56
10. The Allman Brothers Band – "Little Martha" – 2:07

== Personnel ==
- Compilation produced by Bill Levenson and Galadrielle Allman
- Executive producer: Scott Billington
- Mastering: Paul Blakemore
- Artwork and art direction: Nancy Given, Scott Billington, Abbey Anna
- Liner notes essays: Scott Schinder, Galadrielle Allman
