= Dreams (Allman Brothers Band album) =

Compilation album by the Allman Brothers Band
- Released: June 20, 1989
- Recorded: 1966–1988
- Venue: Various
- Genre: Southern rock
- Length: 300:36
- Label: Mercury Records
- Producer: Various

The Allman Brothers Band chronology
Brothers of the Road (1982)	Dreams (1989)	Live at Ludlow Garage: 1970 (1990)

Dreams is a compilation album by the Allman Brothers Band. Packaged as a box set of four CDs or six LPs, it was released on June 20, 1989.

Dreams is a collection of recordings taken from not only the Allman Brothers Band, but also from throughout the musical careers of the Allmans and the band's other members prior to and following its formation. The set was compiled by Bill Levenson (who had put together the Eric Clapton box set Crossroads the year before) and released to coincide with the band's 1989 reformation.

Professional ratings
Review scores
Source	Rating
Allmusic	4.5/5 stars
Rolling Stone	4/5 stars
Encyclopedia of Popular Music	4/5 stars

== Track listing ==
=== Disc one ===
No.	Title	Writer(s)	Source	Length
1.	"Shapes of Things" (The Allman Joys)	Paul Samwell-Smith, Keith Relf, Jim McCarty	previously unreleased demo, August 1966	2:48
2.	"Spoonful" (The Allman Joys)	Willie Dixon	previously unreleased demo, August 1966	3:40
3.	"Crossroads" (The Allman Joys)	Robert Johnson	previously unreleased demo, August 1966	3:33
4.	"Cast Off All My Fears" (The Hour Glass)	Jackson Browne	Hour Glass (1967)	3:25
5.	"Down in Texas" (The Hour Glass)	Eddie Hinton, Marlin Greene	Power of Love (1968)	3:07
6.	"Ain't No Good to Cry" (The Hour Glass)	Al Anderson	previously unreleased studio recording, April 1968	3:06
7.	"B.B. King Medley": "Sweet Little Angel" / "It's My Own Fault" / "How Blue Can You Get" (The Hour Glass)	B.B. King, Jules Taub / John Lee Hooker / Mel London	Duane Allman: An Anthology (1972)	7:06
8.	"Morning Dew" (The 31st of February)	Bonnie Dobson, Tim Rose	Duane & Greg Allman (1972)	3:46
9.	"God Rest His Soul" (The 31st of February)	(Steve Alaimo (Note: In chapter 4 of his autobiography My Cross To Bear, Gregg Allman says that he wrote "God Rest His Soul" but he sold the songwriting credit to Steve Alaimo.))	Duane & Greg Allman	3:56
10.	"I Feel Free" (The Second Coming)	Jack Bruce, Pete Brown	A-side of "I Feel Free" single (1969)	3:31
11.	"She Has Funny Cars" (The Second Coming)	Jorma Kaukonen, Marty Balin	B-side of "I Feel Free" single	4:48
12.	"Goin' Down Slow" (Duane Allman)	Jimmy Oden	Duane Allman: An Anthology	8:47
13.	"Dreams"	Gregg Allman	previously unreleased demo, April 1969	4:55
14.	"Don't Want You No More"	Spencer Davis, Edward Hardin	The Allman Brothers Band (1969)	2:25
15.	"It's Not My Cross to Bear"	G. Allman	The Allman Brothers Band	4:56
16.	"Trouble No More"	McKinley Morganfield	The Allman Brothers Band	3:48
17.	"Dreams"	G. Allman	The Allman Brothers Band	7:15
Total length:				74:12

=== Disc two ===
No.	Title	Writer(s)	Source	Length
1.	"Statesboro Blues"	Blind Willie McTell	previously unreleased outtake, February 1970	4:06
2.	"Hoochie Coochie Man"	Willie Dixon	Idlewild South (1970)	4:57
3.	"Midnight Rider"	G. Allman, Robert Payne	Idlewild South	2:58
4.	"Dimples" (live, 4/11/70 at Ludlow Garage, Cincinnati)	John Lee Hooker, James Bracken	Duane Allman: An Anthology Vol. II (1974); later included on Live at Ludlow Garage: 1970 (1990)	5:02
5.	"I'm Gonna Move to the Outskirts of Town" (live, 4/11/70 at Ludlow Garage, Cincinnati)	William Weldon	previously unreleased live recording; later included on Live at Ludlow Garage: 1970	9:23
6.	"Revival"	Dickey Betts	Idlewild South	4:04
7.	"One More Ride"	G. Allman, D. Betts	previously unreleased outtake, July 1970	2:41
8.	"Whipping Post" (live, 3/12/71 at Fillmore East, New York City)	G. Allman	At Fillmore East (1971)	22:53
9.	"In Memory of Elizabeth Reed" (live, 3/13/71 at Fillmore East, New York City)	D. Betts	At Fillmore East	12:58
10.	"Drunken Hearted Boy" (live, 3/13/71 at Fillmore East, New York City)	Elvin Bishop	previously unreleased live recording; later included on The Fillmore Concerts (1992)	6:54
Total length:				75:56

=== Disc three ===
No.	Title	Writer(s)	Source	Length
1.	"You Don't Love Me" / "Soul Serenade" (live, 8/26/71 at A&R Studios, New York City for WPLJ broadcast)	Willie Cobbs / Curtis Ousley, Luther Dixon	previously unreleased live recording; later included on Live from A&R Studios (2015)	19:28
2.	"Blue Sky"	Betts	Eat a Peach (1972)	5:10
3.	"Little Martha"	Duane Allman	Eat a Peach	2:13
4.	"Melissa"	G. Allman, Steve Alaimo	Eat a Peach	4:02
5.	"Ain't Wastin' Time No More" (live 4/2/72 at Mar Y Sol Festival, Vega Baja, Puerto Rico)	G. Allman	Mar y Sol: The First International Puerto Rico Pop Festival (1972)	4:46
6.	"Wasted Words"	G. Allman	Brothers and Sisters (1973)	4:21
7.	"Ramblin' Man"	Betts	Brothers and Sisters	4:48
8.	"Southbound"	Betts	Brothers and Sisters	5:10
9.	"Jessica"	Betts	Brothers and Sisters	7:30
10.	"Midnight Rider" (Gregg Allman)	G. Allman	Laid Back (1973)	4:26
11.	"One Way Out" (live, 9/26/73 at Winterland, San Francisco)	Elmore James, Marshall Sehorn, Sonny Boy Williamson II	previously unreleased live recording; later included on Brothers and Sisters deluxe reissue (2013)	7:59
12.	"Long Time Gone" (Dickey Betts)	Betts	Highway Call (1974)	4:30
Total length:				74:23

=== Disc four ===
No.	Title	Writer(s)	Source	Length
1.	"Can't Lose What You Never Had"	McKinley Morganfield	Win, Lose or Draw (1975)	5:52
2.	"Come and Go Blues" (The Gregg Allman Band)	G. Allman	Playin' Up a Storm (1977)	4:46
3.	"Bougainvillea" (Dickey Betts & Great Southern)	D. Betts, Don Johnson	Dickey Betts & Great Southern (1977)	7:13
4.	"Can You Fool?" (Allman and Woman)	Michael Smotherman	Two the Hard Way (1977)	3:19
5.	"Good Time Feeling" (Dickey Betts & Great Southern)	D. Betts	Atlanta's Burning Down (1978)	4:28
6.	"Crazy Love"	D. Betts	Enlightened Rogues (1979)	3:44
7.	"Can't Take It with You"	D. Betts, Don Johnson	Enlightened Rogues	3:34
8.	"Just Ain't Easy" (live, 7/19/1979 at Merriweather Post Pavilion, Columbia, MD)	G. Allman	previously unreleased live recording	5:01
9.	"In Memory of Elizabeth Reed" (live, 7/19/1979 at Merriweather Post Pavilion, Columbia, MD)	D. Betts	previously unreleased live recording	10:52
10.	"Angeline"	D. Betts, Mike Lawler, Johnny Cobb	Reach for the Sky (1980)	3:40
11.	"Things You Used to Do"	G. Allman, Keith England	Brothers of the Road (1981)	3:42
12.	"Nancy" (Dickey Betts)	D. Betts, Jim Goff	previously unreleased studio recording, Summer 1981	3:51
13.	"Rain" (Gregg Allman)	John Lennon, Paul McCartney	previously unreleased studio recording, August 1985	3:03
14.	"I'm No Angel" (The Gregg Allman Band)	Tony Colton, Phil Palmer	I'm No Angel (album) (1987)	3:41
15.	"Demons" (The Gregg Allman Band)	G. Allman, Dan Toler, David Toler	Just Before the Bullets Fly (1988)	3:28
16.	"Duane's Tune" (Dickey Betts)	D. Betts	previously unreleased studio recording, June 1988	5:51
Total length:				76:05

== Personnel ==
The Allman Brothers Band

- Duane Allman – Electric Guitar, Slide Guitar, Acoustic Guitar, Dobro, Vocals (1969–1971)
- Gregg Allman – Vocals, Hammond Organ, Piano, Electric Piano, Rhythm Guitar, Acoustic Guitar, Vocals (1969–1976, 1979–1982)
- Dickey Betts – Electric Guitar, Slide Guitar, Acoustic Guitar, Dobro, Vocals (1969–1976, 1979–1982)
- Berry Oakley – Bass, Vocals (1969–1972)
- Butch Trucks – Drums, Percussion, Tambourine, Timpani (1969–1976, 1979–1982)
- Jai Johanny Johanson (Jaimoe) – Drums, Congas (1969–1976, 1979–1980)
- Chuck Leavell – Piano, Electric Piano, Vocals (1972–1976)
- Lamar Williams – Bass (1972–1976)
- Dan Toler – Guitar, Acoustic Guitar (1979–1982)
- David Goldflies – Bass (1979–1982)
- Mike Lawler – Keyboards, Electric Piano, Producer (1980–1982)
- David "Frankie" Toler – Drums, Percussion (1980–1982)

The Allman Joys

- Duane Allman – Lead Guitar, Vocals (1966)
- Gregg Allman – Organ, Guitar, Vocals (1966)
- Bob Keller – Bass, Harmonica, Vocals (1966)
- Maynard Portwood – Drums (1966)

The Hour Glass

- Duane Allman – Guitar (1967-1968)
- Gregg Allman – Organ, Electric Piano, Piano, Lead Vocals (1967-1968)
- Paul Hornsby – Guitar, Keyboards, Organ, Piano, Vocals (1967)
- Mabron McKinley – Bass (1967)
- Johnny Sandlin – Drums (1967-1968)
- Jesse Willard Carr – Bass, Vocals (1968)
- Pete Carr – Bass (1968)

The 31st of February

- Duane Allman – Lead Guitar (1968)
- Gregg Allman – Organ, Lead Vocals (1968)
- Butch Trucks – Drums, Percussion (1968)
- Scott Boyer – Acoustic Guitar, Vocals (1968)
- David Brown – Bass (1968)

The Second Coming

- Dickey Betts – Guitar, Lead Vocals (1968-1969)
- Berry Oakley – Bass (1968-1969)
- Dale Betts – Keyboards, Vocals (1968-1969)
- Reese Wynans – Organ (1968-1969)
- John Meeks – Drums (1968-1969)

Duane Allman (solo)

- Duane Allman – Guitar, Lead Vocals (1969)
- Berry Oakley – Bass (1969)
- Paul Hornsby – Piano (1969)
- Johnny Sandlin – Drums (1969)

Gregg Allman (solo)

- Gregg Allman – Lead Vocals, Acoustic Guitar (1973, 1985)
- Jaimoe – Congas (1973)
- Chuck Leavell – Electric Piano (1973)
- Scott Boyer – Lead Guitar (1973)
- Tommy Talton – Acoustic Guitar (1973)
- Johnny Sandlin – Bass (1973)
- Bill Stewart – Drums (1973)
- Ed Freeman – String and Horn Arrangements, Conductor (1973)
- Helene Miles – Vocals (1973)
- Hilda Harris – Vocals (1973)
- Maeretha Stewart – Vocals (1973)
- Dan Toler – Acoustic Guitar (1985)
- Charles May Ensemble – Choir (1985)

Dickey Betts (solo)

- Dickey Betts – Lead Guitar, Dobro, Lead Vocals (1974, 1981)
- Chuck Leavell (1974)
- Tommy Talton – Acoustic Guitar (1974)
- John Hughey – Pedal steel guitar (1974)
- Johnny Sandlin – Bass, Percussion (1974)
- David Walshaw – Drums, Percussion (1974)
- Stray Straton – Vocals (1974)
- Buck Rambo – Vocals (1974)
- Dottie Rambo – Vocals (1974)
- Reba Rambo – Vocals (1974)
- Johnny Cobb – Keyboards, Piano (1981)
- Mike Lawler – Keyboards (1981)
- Jerry McCoy – Bass (1981)
- R.E. Hardaway – Drums (1981)

The Gregg Allman Band

- Gregg Allman – Organ, Piano, Acoustic Guitar, Lead Vocals (1976, 1987–1988)
- John Leslie Hug – Guitar (1976)
- Ricky Hirsch – Guitar (1976)
- Steve Beckmeier – Guitar (1976)
- Neil Larsen – Keyboards (1976)
- Willie Weeks – Bass (1976)
- Bill Stewart – Drums (1976)
- David Luell – Horn (1976)
- Pat Rizzo – Horn (1976)
- Steve Madaio – Horn (1976)
- Nick DeCaro – Conductor, String Arrangements (1976)
- Dan Toler – Guitar (1987)
- Tim Heding – Keyboards (1987-1988)
- Bruce Waibel – Bass (1987-1988)
- David "Frankie" Toler – Drums (1987-1988)
- Chaz Trippy – Percussion (1987-1988)

Dickey Betts & Great Southern

- Dickey Betts – Guitar, Slide Guitar, Lead Vocals (1977-1978)
- Dan Toler – Guitar (1977-1978)
- Tom Broome – Keyboards (1977)
- Ken Tibbets – Bass (1977)
- Doni Sharbono – Drums, Percussion (1977-1978)
- Jerry Thompson – Drums, Percussion (1977)
- Don Johnson – Vocals (1977)
- Michael Workman – Keyboards (1978)
- David Goldflies – Bass (1978)
- David Toler – Drums, Percussion (1978)

Allman and Woman

- Gregg Allman – Organ, Vocals (1977)
- Cher – Vocals (1977)
- Fred Tackett – Guitar (1977)
- John Leslie Hug – Guitar (1977)
- Ricky Hirsch – Guitar (1977)
- Steve Beckmeier – Guitar (1977)
- Mickey Raphael – Harmonica (1977)
- Neil Larsen – Keyboards (1977)
- Willie Weeks – Bass (1977)
- Bill Stewart – Drums (1977)
- Bobbye Hall – Percussion (1977)

The Dickey Betts Band

- Dickey Betts – Lead Guitar (1988)
- Butch Trucks - Percussion (1988)
- Warren Haynes – Lead Guitar (1988)
- Johnny Neel – Keyboards (1988)
- Marty Privette – Bass (1988)
- Matt Abts – Drums (1988)

Guest Musicians

- Elvin Bishop – Guitar, Vocals (1971)
- Stephen Miller – Piano (1971)
- Thom Doucette – Harmonica (1971)
- Les Dudek – Electric Guitar, Acoustic Guitar (1973)
- Bonnie Bramlett – Vocals (1979)
- Jim Essery – Harmonica (1979)

Production

- Adrian Barber – Producer
- Alan Facemire – Producer
- Chips Moman – Producer
- Dallas Smith – Producer
- Dickey Betts Band – Producer
- Don Tanner – Producer
- Jack Richardson – Producer
- John Ryan – Producer
- Jon Mathias – Producer
- Johnny Sandlin – Producer
- Lenny Waronker – Producer
- Rick Hall – Producer
- Rodney Mills – Producer
- Russ Titelman – Producer
- Steve Alaimo – Producer
- Timothy Eaton – Producer
- Tom Dowd – Producer
- Bill Levenson – Compilation Producer, Liner Notes
- William Perkins – Executive Producer
- Kirk West – Associate Producer
- Dennis Drake – Digital Compilation, Engineer
- Greg Calbi – Mastering
- Bonnie MacLean – Photography
- David Singer – Photography
- Harry Weinger – Editorial Assistant
- John Swenson – Essay, Liner Notes
- Michael Bays – Art Direction
- Michael Klotz – Design
