= The Fox Box =

Live album by The Allman Brothers Band
- Released: March 24, 2017
- Recorded: September 24–26, 2004
- Venues: Fox Theatre; Atlanta, Georgia
- Genres: Southern rock, blues rock
- Label: Peach Records
- Producer: The Allman Brothers Band

The Allman Brothers Band chronology
| Live from A&R Studios (2016) | The Fox Box (2017) | Cream of the Crop 2003 (2018) |

The Fox Box is an eight-CD live album by the Allman Brothers Band. It contains the complete three-concert run recorded on September 24, 25, and 26, 2004 at the Fox Theatre in Atlanta. It was released on March 24, 2017.

== Critical reception ==
On jambands.com, Larson Sutton wrote, "This is a celebration, and a fittingly fantastic one, with a comprehensive 55 songs played over three nights, only one repeated ("Dreams"), and several special guests on hand to toast the Brothers."

On AllMusic, Dave Lynch said, "The Fox Box sold out its initial 2004 run before being re-released in late 2005 (and again in 2017, remastered with some tightening of the song spacing, and trimmed down a bit from nine discs to eight).... The Fox Box showcases practically everything that the 21st century Allmans could present at their most epic, revealing a band in astoundingly good shape 35 years after its founding."

In the Sarasota Herald-Tribune, Wade Tatangelo wrote, "While a bit much for the casual Allman Brothers Band enthusiast or newbie needing a shot of At Fillmore East, The Fox Box is a fun, thrilling ride that shouldn't be missed by any self-respecting fan. It’s nearly nine hours of music that never loses its relevance and focus... Yes, from the opening "Mountain Jam" to the closing "Whipping Post", it's a smile-inducing journey."

== Track listing ==
September 24, 2004:

Disc 1

1. "Mountain Jam" (Donovan Leitch, Gregg Allman, Duane Allman, Dickey Betts, Jai Johanny Johanson, Berry Oakley, Butch Trucks)
2. "Trouble No More" (McKinley Morganfield)
3. "Midnight Rider" (G. Allman, Robert Kim Payne)
4. "Wasted Words" (G. Allman)
5. "Worried Down with the Blues" (Warren Haynes, Allen Woody, John Jaworowicz)
6. "You Don't Love Me" (Willie Cobbs)
7. "Ain't Wastin' Time No More" (G. Allman)

Disc 2

1. "Rockin' Horse" (G. Allman, Haynes, Jack Pearson, Woody)
2. "Hot 'Lanta" (G. Allman, D. Allman, Betts, Johanson, Oakley, Trucks)
3. "Melissa" (G. Allman)
4. "Come and Go Blues" (G. Allman)
5. "Can't Lose What You Never Had" (Morganfield)
6. "Why Does Love Got to Be So Sad?" (Eric Clapton, Bobby Whitlock)
7. "Franklin's Tower" (Jerry Garcia, Bill Kreutzmann, Robert Hunter)

Disc 3

1. "Black Hearted Woman" (G. Allman)
2. "Dreams" (G. Allman)
3. "Mountain Jam" reprise (Leitch, G. Allman, D. Allman, Betts, Johanson, Oakley, Trucks)
4. "Southbound" (Betts)

September 25, 2004:

Disc 4

1. "Les Brers in A Minor" intro (Betts)
2. "Don't Want You No More" / "It's Not My Cross to Bear" (Spencer Davis, Edward Hardin / G. Allman)
3. "Statesboro Blues" (Will McTell)
4. "Stand Back" (G. Allman, Oakley)
5. "Who's Been Talking" (Chester Burnett)
6. "Soulshine" (Haynes)
7. "Good Clean Fun" (G. Allman, Betts, Johnny Neel)
8. "Old Before My Time" (G. Allman, Haynes)
9. "Woman Across the River" (Bettye Crutcher, Allen Jones)
10. "Instrumental Illness" (Haynes, Oteil Burbridge)

Disc 5

1. "The Night They Drove Old Dixie Down" (Robbie Robertson)
2. "Leave My Blues at Home" (G. Allman)
3. "Key to the Highway" (Charlie Segar, Big Bill Broonzy)
4. "Don't Think Twice, It's All Right" (Bob Dylan)
5. "One Way Out" (Marshall Sehorn, Elmore James)
6. "Blue Sky" (Betts)
7. "Dreams" (G. Allman)
8. "Les Brers in A Minor" (Betts)
9. "Layla" (Clapton, Jim Gordon)

September 26, 2004:

Disc 6

1. "Revival" (Betts)
2. "Every Hungry Woman" (G. Allman)
3. "Done Somebody Wrong" (James, Clarence Lewis, Bobby Robinson)
4. "Hoochie Coochie Man" (Willie Dixon)
5. "Desdemona" (G. Allman, Haynes)
6. "High Cost of Low Living" (G. Allman, Haynes, Jeff Anders, Ronnie Burgin)
7. "44 Blues" (Roosevelt Sykes)
8. "End of the Line" (G. Allman, Haynes, Woody, Jaworowicz)

Disc 7

1. "Dreams" (G. Allman)
2. "I Walk on Gilded Splinters" (Mac Rebennack)
3. "Stormy Monday" (T-Bone Walker)
4. "The Same Thing" (Dixon)
5. "In Memory of Elizabeth Reed" (Betts)

Disc 8

1. "In Memory of Elizabeth Reed" continued (Betts)
2. "Don't Keep Me Wonderin'" (G. Allman)
3. "No One to Run With" (Betts, John Prestia)
4. "Whipping Post" (G. Allman)

== Personnel ==
The Allman Brothers Band

- Gregg Allman – Hammond B-3 organ, piano, acoustic guitar, vocals
- Warren Haynes – guitar, vocals
- Derek Trucks – guitar
- Oteil Burbridge – bass, vocals
- Butch Trucks – drums
- Jaimoe – drums
- Marc Quiñones – congas, percussion, vocals

Additional musicians

- Jack Pearson – guitar on "Dreams", "Mountain Jam" reprise, "Southbound"
- Susan Tedeschi – guitar and vocals on "Don't Think Twice, It's All Right"
- Vaylor Trucks – guitar on "One Way Out"
- Rob Barraco – keyboards on "The Same Thing", "In Memory of Elizabeth Reed"

Production

- Produced by the Allman Brothers Band
- Project supervisor: Bill Levenson
- Mixing: Bruce Judd
- Mastering: Kevin Reeves
- Package design: Terry Bradley
- Photography: Kirk West
- Liner notes: John Lynskey
