= An Anthology Vol. II =

Compilation album by Duane Allman
- Released: August 9, 1974
- Recorded: 1968 – 1971
- Genre: Rock, blues, R&B, soul
- Length: 79 minutes
- Label: Capricorn

Duane Allman chronology
An Anthology (1972)	An Anthology Vol. II (1974)	Skydog: The Duane Allman Retrospective (2013)

An Anthology Vol. II is an album by Duane Allman. It is a compilation of songs on which Allman plays guitar. On some tracks he plays as a session musician on recordings by other artists, including Aretha Franklin, Otis Rush, Ronnie Hawkins, Wilson Pickett, and Boz Scaggs. Other tracks feature Allman as a member of various bands, most famously the Allman Brothers Band. He sings lead vocals on three songs – "Happily Married Man", "No Money Down", and "Dimples". Six of the 21 tracks were previously unreleased.

An Anthology Vol. II was released in 1974 as a two-disc LP. It was a follow-up to the similarly conceived An Anthology. It reached number 49 on the Billboard albums chart.

== Critical reception ==
AllMusic said, "The session work with other players here isn't quite as good as the material on the first anthology, but An Anthology, Vol. 2 does feature a live cut by Delaney & Bonnie, plus a pair of what were then previously unissued Allman Brothers Band live tracks... Anyone who owns the first double-CD set will almost certainly have to own this one as well..."

The Rolling Stone Album Guide wrote, "Both volumes of Anthology collect sterling examples of Allman's session work, and are highly recommended to guitar students and Southern soul buffs alike."

Spin magazine said, "[An Anthology and An Anthology Vol. II are an] indispensable summary of Allman's career as a hotshot sideman.... Choice R&B material like Wilson Pickett's version of "Born to Be Wild" and Johnny Jenkins' "Walk on Gilded Splinters"... makes it clear where Southern rock got its soul."

== Track listing ==
Side one
No.	Title	Writer(s)	Performing artist	Original release	Length
1	"Happily Married Man"	Duane Allman	Duane Allman	previously unreleased	2:40
2	"It Ain't Fair"	Ronnie Miller	Aretha Franklin	This Girl's in Love with You	3:20
3	"The Weight"	Robbie Robertson	King Curtis	Instant Groove	2:48
4	"You Reap What You Sow"	Paul Butterfield, Mike Bloomfield, Nick Gravenites	Otis Rush	Mourning in the Morning	4:54
5	"Matchbox"	Carl Perkins	Ronnie Hawkins	Ronnie Hawkins	3:06
6	"Born to Be Wild"	Mars Bonfire	Wilson Pickett	Hey Jude	2:44
Side two
No.	Title	Writer(s)	Performing artist	Original release	Length
1	"No Money Down"	Chuck Berry	Duane Allman	previously unreleased	3:25
2	"Been Gone Too Long"	Gregg Allman	Hour Glass	previously unreleased	3:10
3	"Stuff You Gotta Watch"	Dan Grier, George Jackson, Tom Dowd	Arthur Conley	More Sweet Soul	2:12
4	"Dirty Old Man"	Mac Davis, Delaney Bramlett	Lulu	New Routes	2:18
5	"Push Push"	Herbie Mann	Herbie Mann	Push Push	9:55
Side three
No.	Title	Writer(s)	Performing artist	Original release	Length
1	"Walk on Guilded Splinters"	Dr. John Creaux	Johnny Jenkins	Ton-Ton Macoute!	5:23
2	"Waiting for a Train"	Jimmie Rodgers	Boz Scaggs	Boz Scaggs	2:40
3	"Don't Tell Me Your Troubles"	Don Gibson	Ronnie Hawkins	The Hawk	2:14
4	"Goin' Upstairs"	John Lee Hooker	Sam Samudio	Sam, Hard and Heavy	5:06
5	"Come On in My Kitchen"	Robert Johnson	Delaney & Bonnie	previously unreleased	3:36
Side four
No.	Title	Writer(s)	Performing artist	Original release	Length
1	"Dimples"	James Bracken, John Lee Hooker	The Allman Brothers Band	previously unreleased	5:05
2	"Going Up the Country"	Alan Wilson	The Duck and the Bear (Johnny Sandlin and Eddie Hinton)	single c/w "Hand Jive"	2:35
3	"Done Somebody Wrong"	David C. Thomas, Clarence Lewis, Elmore James, Morgan Robinson	The Allman Brothers Band	At Fillmore East	4:05
4	"Leave My Blues at Home"	Gregg Allman	The Allman Brothers Band	Idlewild South	4:15
5	"Midnight Rider"	Gregg Allman	The Allman Brothers Band	previously unreleased	2:56

== Personnel ==
Production

- Tony Yoken – compilation
- Glen Ashmore – coordination
- Richard Mantel – design
- Jeff Albertson, Chuck Pulin – photography
