= Aretha Live at Fillmore West =

1971 live album by Aretha Franklin

Live album by Aretha Franklin
- Released: May 19, 1971
- Recorded: March 5–7, 1971
- Venues: Fillmore West Concert Hall (San Francisco, California)
- Label: Atlantic
- Producer: Jerry Wexler

Aretha Franklin chronology
Spirit in the Dark (1970)	Aretha Live at Fillmore West (1971)	Aretha's Greatest Hits (1971)

Aretha Live at Fillmore West is a live album by American singer Aretha Franklin. Released on May 19, 1971, by Atlantic Records. It was reissued on compact disc in 1993 through Rhino Records. An expanded, limited edition 4-CD box set titled Don't Fight the Feeling: The Complete Aretha Franklin & King Curtis Live at Fillmore West was released by Rhino in 2005 that was limited to 5,000 numbered copies. In addition, there is a guest duet vocal by Ray Charles on "Spirit in the Dark".

Franklin played a Fender Rhodes piano "Eleanor Rigby", "Spirit in the Dark", "Don't Play That Song", "Make it With You" and "Dr. Feelgood". Backing Franklin was King Curtis' band, the Kingpins, featuring Cornell Dupree on guitar, Bernard Purdie on drums, and Jerry Jemmott on bass, Billy Preston on organ, Curtis on saxophone, together with the Memphis Horns. The album reached number one on the Billboard R&B album chart on June 19, 1971. It became Aretha's first Gold album since "Aretha Now" back in 1968.

== Background ==
The recording was made at the Fillmore West concert hall, the storied rock venue in San Francisco, over three nights: March 5, 6 and 7 in 1971. The album opens with Franklin's best-known song, her version of Otis Redding's "Respect". The album features her take on many "hippie" anthems as executive/album producer Jerry Wexler wanted to reach out to the expected hippie audience in San Francisco. Covers include the Bread song "Make It With You", the Stephen Stills song, "Love the One You're With", Diana Ross's "Reach Out and Touch (Somebody's Hand)", the Beatles' "Eleanor Rigby" and Simon and Garfunkel's "Bridge over Troubled Water".

Professional ratings
Review scores
Source	Rating
AllMusic	4.5/5 stars
Christgau's Record Guide	B
The Encyclopedia of Popular Music	4/5 stars
The Rolling Stone Album Guide	3/5 stars

== Track listing ==
=== Original release ===
Side one
No.	Title	Writer(s)	Length
1.	"Respect"	Otis Redding	3:53
2.	"Love the One You're With"	Stephen Stills	4:15
3.	"Bridge Over Troubled Water"	Paul Simon	5:55
4.	"Eleanor Rigby"	Lennon–McCartney	2:33
5.	"Make It with You"	David Gates	4:33
6.	"Don't Play That Song"	Ahmet Ertegün, Betty Nelson	3:16

Side two
No.	Title	Writer(s)	Length
7.	"Dr. Feelgood"	Aretha Franklin, Ted White	7:06
8.	"Spirit in the Dark"	Franklin	5:33
9.	"Spirit in the Dark" (Reprise with Ray Charles)	Franklin	8:53
10.	"Reach Out and Touch"	Nickolas Ashford, Valerie Simpson	2:35

2006 deluxe edition disc 2 – Alternates and Unused Songs
No.	Title	Writer(s)	Length
1.	"Respect" (1971-03–06th)	Redding	3:56
2.	"Call Me" (1971-03–07th)	Franklin	5:38
3.	"Mixed-Up Girl" (1971-03–05th)	Jimmy Webb	2:58
4.	"Love the One You're With" (1971-03–05th)	Stills	4:18
5.	"Bridge Over Troubled Water" (1971-03–06th)	Simon	7:41
6.	"Share Your Love with Me" (1971-03–06th)	Alfred Braggs, Deadric Malone	4:29
7.	"Eleanor Rigby" (1971-03–05th)	Lennon, McCartney	2:37
8.	"Make It with You" (1971-03–06th)	Gates	4:49
9.	"You're All I Need to Get By" (1971-03–06th)	Ashford, Simpson	5:02
10.	"Don't Play That Song" (1971-03–05th)	Ertegün, Nelson	3:16
11.	"Dr. Feelgood" (1971-03–05th)	Franklin, White	6:44
12.	"Spirit in the Dark" (1971-03–05th)	Franklin	6:42
13.	"Spirit in the Dark" (Reprise) (1971-03–05th)	Franklin	2:40

=== Don't Fight the Feeling: The Complete Aretha Franklin & King Curtis Live at Fillmore West ===
Disc 1

1. "Intro"
2. "Knock on Wood" – The Memphis Horns
3. "Whole Lotta Love" – King Curtis
4. "Them Changes" – King Curtis
5. "A Whiter Shade of Pale" – King Curtis
6. "My Sweet Lord" – Billy Preston
7. "Ode to Billie Joe" – King Curtis
8. "Mr. Bojangles" – King Curtis
9. "Soul Serenade" – King Curtis
10. "Memphis Soul Stew" – King Curtis
11. "Signed, Sealed, Delivered I'm Yours" – King Curtis
12. "Respect" – Aretha Franklin
13. "Call Me" – Aretha Franklin
14. "Mixed-Up Girl" – Aretha Franklin
15. "Love the One You're With" – Aretha Franklin
16. "Bridge Over Troubled Water" – Aretha Franklin
17. "Eleanor Rigby" – Aretha Franklin
18. "Make It with You" – Aretha Franklin
19. "Don’t Play that Song" – Aretha Franklin

Disc 2

1. "You're All I Need to Get By" – Aretha Franklin
2. "Dr. Feelgood" – Aretha Franklin
3. "Spirit in the Dark" – Aretha Franklin
4. "Spirit in the Dark" (reprise) – Aretha Franklin
5. "Knock on Wood" – The Memphis Horns
6. "Them Changes" – King Curtis
7. "Whole Lotta Love" – King Curtis
8. "A Whiter Shade of Pale" – King Curtis
9. "I Stand Accused" – King Curtis
10. "Soul Serenade" – King Curtis
11. "Memphis Soul Stew" – King Curtis
12. "Respect" – Aretha Franklin
13. "Call Me" – Aretha Franklin
14. "Love the One You’re with" – Aretha Franklin
15. "Bridge Over Troubled Water" – Aretha Franklin

Disc 3

1. "Share Your Love with Me" – Aretha Franklin
2. "Eleanor Rigby" – Aretha Franklin
3. "Make It With You" – Aretha Franklin
4. "You're All I Need to Get By" – Aretha Franklin
5. "Don't Play That Song" – Aretha Franklin
6. "Dr. Feelgood" – Aretha Franklin
7. "Spirit in the Dark" – Aretha Franklin
8. "Spirit in the Dark" (reprise) – Aretha Franklin
9. "Knock On Wood" – The Memphis Horns
10. "Them Changes" – King Curtis
11. "A Whiter Shade of Pale" – King Curtis
12. "Ode To Billie Joe" – King Curtis
13. "Soul Serenade" – King Curtis
14. "Memphis Soul Stew" – King Curtis

Disc 4

1. "Respect" – Aretha Franklin
2. "Call Me" – Aretha Franklin
3. "Love the One You're With" – Aretha Franklin
4. "Bridge Over Troubled Water" – Aretha Franklin
5. "Share Your Love with Me" – Aretha Franklin
6. "Eleanor Rigby" – Aretha Franklin
7. "Make It With You" – Aretha Franklin
8. "Don't Play That Song" – Aretha Franklin
9. "You're All I Need to Get By" – Aretha Franklin
10. "Dr. Feelgood" – Aretha Franklin
11. "Spirit in the Dark" – Aretha Franklin
12. "Spirit in the Dark" (reprise) – Aretha Franklin with Ray Charles
13. "Reach Out and Touch (Somebody’s Hand)" – Aretha Franklin

Rhino Handmade remastered 2005 liner notes:
Disc 1 tracks 01 to 19, and Disc 2 tracks 01 to 04 were recorded on March 5, 1971.
Disc 2 tracks 05 to 15, and Disc 3 tracks 01 to 08 were recorded on March 6, 1971.
Disc 3 tracks 09 to 14, and Disc 4 tracks 01 to 13 were recorded on March 7, 1971.

== Personnel ==
- Aretha Franklin – vocals, Fender Rhodes
- Cornell Dupree – guitar
- Jerry Jemmott – bass
- Truman Thomas – piano
- Billy Preston – organ
- Bernard Purdie – drums
- Pancho Morales – congas
- King Curtis – saxophone, orchestra leader
- Memphis Horns – horns
- Brenda Bryant, Margaret Branch, Pat Smith – backing vocals
- Arif Mardin – horn arrangements
- Larry Wilcox – horn arrangement on "Make It With You"
- Tom Dowd – horn arrangement on "Don't Play That Song"
- Ray Charles – piano and vocals on "Spirit in the Dark"

== Charts ==
Chart (1971)	Peak position
US Billboard 200	7
US Top R&B/Hip-Hop Albums (Billboard)	1
Chart (2018)	Peak position
Japanese Albums (Oricon)	191

== Certifications ==
Region	Certification	Certified units/sales
United States (RIAA)	Gold	500,000^{^}
^{^} Shipments figures based on certification alone.

== See also ==
- List of Billboard number-one R&B albums of 1971
