= An Anthology (Duane Allman album) =

Compilation album by Duane Allman
- Released: November 1972
- Recorded: 1968–1971
- Genre: Southern rock, rock, blues
- Length: 1:30:43
- Label: Capricorn, Mercury
- Producer: Various

Duane Allman chronology
| An Anthology (1972) | An Anthology Vol. II (1974) |

Professional ratings
Review scores
| Source | Rating |
|---|---|
| Allmusic | " |
| Christgau's Record Guide | B+ |
| The Rolling Stone Album Guide | 4/5 stars |
| The Virgin Encyclopedia of 70s Music | 4/5 stars |

An Anthology is a compilation of recordings featuring guitarist Duane Allman. The double album consists of a selection of songs by various artists that Allman contributed to as a session musician, along with early recordings by his band the Hourglass and his partial-namesake group, the Allman Brothers Band. The album also features rare solo work by the guitarist.

The album peaked at number 28 on the Billboard albums chart during a twenty six-week run on the chart.

== Critical reception ==
Music critic Stephen Thomas Erlewine awarded the compilation four and a half stars out of five in his review for the AllMusic website, calling it "an excellent introduction and retrospective." He also noted that "by including session cuts, as well as his brief sojourn in Eric Clapton's Derek and the Dominos and a few rare solo tracks, along with a number of representative Allman Brothers songs, the double-album Anthology winds up drawing a complete portrait of Allman."

== Track listing ==
Side one
| No. | Title | Writer(s) | Performer(s) | Length |
|---|---|---|---|---|
| 1. | "B.B. King Medley": "Sweet Little Angel"; "It's My Own Fault"; "How Blue Can You Get?" | Riley B. King/Jules Taub; John Lee Hooker; Mel London | The Hourglass | 7:06 |
| 2. | "Hey Jude" | John Lennon/Paul McCartney | Wilson Pickett | 4:03 |
| 3. | "The Road of Love" | Clarence Carter | Clarence Carter | 2:55 |
| 4. | "Goin' Down Slow" | St. Louis Jimmy Oden | Duane Allman | 8:46 |

Side two
| No. | Title | Writer(s) | Performer(s) | Length |
|---|---|---|---|---|
| 1. | "The Weight" | Robbie Robertson | Aretha Franklin | 2:59 |
| 2. | "Games People Play" | Joe South | King Curtis | 2:47 |
| 3. | "Shake for Me" | Willie Dixon | John Hammond | 2:42 |
| 4. | "Loan Me a Dime" | Fenton Robinson | Boz Scaggs | 13:01 |
| 5. | "Rollin' Stone" | McKinley Morganfield | Johnny Jenkins | 4:57 |

Side three
| No. | Title | Writer(s) | Performer(s) | Length |
|---|---|---|---|---|
| 1. | "Livin' on the Open Road" | Delaney Bramlett | Delaney & Bonnie & Friends | 3:04 |
| 2. | "Down Along the Cove" | Bob Dylan | Johnny Jenkins | 3:04 |
| 3. | "Please Be with Me" | Scott Boyer | Cowboy | 3:49 |
| 4. | "Mean Old World" | Walter Jacobs | Eric Clapton and Duane Allman | 3:51 |
| 5. | "Layla" (alternate mix) | Eric Clapton/Jim Gordon | Derek and the Dominos | 7:06 |

Side four
| No. | Title | Writer(s) | Performer(s) | Length |
|---|---|---|---|---|
| 1. | "Statesboro Blues" | Willie McTell | The Allman Brothers Band | 4:18 |
| 2. | "Don't Keep Me Wonderin'" | Gregg Allman | The Allman Brothers Band | 3:28 |
| 3. | "Standback" | Gregg Allman/Berry Oakley | The Allman Brothers Band | 3:25 |
| 4. | "Dreams" | Gregg Allman | The Allman Brothers Band | 7:16 |
| 5. | "Little Martha" | Duane Allman | The Allman Brothers Band | 2:06 |

== Charts ==
| Chart (1972) | Peak position |
|---|---|
| US Billboard Top LPs | 28 |
