= Live at Fillmore West =

King Curtis Live at Fillmore West

Live album by King Curtis
- Released: August 1971
- Recorded: March 5–7, 1971
- Labels: Atlantic, Rhino
- Producers: King Curtis; Arif Mardin; Jerry Wexler

King Curtis chronology
Get Ready (1970)	King Curtis Live at Fillmore West (1971)	Everybody's Talking (1972)

Professional ratings
Review scores
Source	Rating
AllMusic	4.5/5 stars
The Rolling Stone Album Guide	4/5 stars

Live at Fillmore West is an album by King Curtis, released in 1971. The album showcases the concert he played with his band the Kingpins at the Fillmore West venue in San Francisco in March 1971, who were supporting and backing soul singer Aretha Franklin. A week after its release in August 1971, Curtis was stabbed to death outside his brownstone apartment in New York City.

It was reissued on compact disc in the 1990s through Rhino Records and was released in an expanded edition in 2006. In addition it was released as an expanded edition four-CD box set entitled, Don't Fight the Feeling: The Complete Aretha Franklin & King Curtis Live At Fillmore West by Rhino Handmade in 2005, featuring the complete concert by King Curtis and Aretha Franklin. This edition was limited to 5,000 numbered copies.

== History ==
The album was recorded at the storied San Francisco rock venue the Fillmore West over three nights, March 5, 6, and 7, 1971. King Curtis and his band the Kingpins were a supporting act for Aretha Franklin, as well as playing as her backing band. The album opens with his own "Memphis Soul Stew", and includes his signature composition, "Soul Serenade", but the bulk of the songs are cover versions of recent rock, soul and country recordings, including Stevie Wonder's "Signed, Sealed, Delivered I'm Yours", Led Zeppelin's "Whole Lotta Love" and Bobbie Gentry's "Ode to Billie Joe". Curtis' version of Procol Harum's "A Whiter Shade of Pale" later found renewed fame when used in the opening title sequence of cult British comedy film Withnail and I.

Professionally Curtis was having a prolific and successful time in the summer of 1971. Aretha Franklin's Live at Fillmore West album was a huge hit, he had contributed to two tracks on John Lennon's album, Imagine, recorded the theme to the television show Soul Train, and had made a highly acclaimed performance at the Montreux Jazz Festival with Champion Jack Dupree.

A week after the album's release, Curtis was stabbed to death outside his brownstone apartment in New York City, following an argument with two drug addicts. The day after he died the album peaked at No. 54 on the Billboard 200 album chart, his greatest success as a solo artist.

== Track listing ==
=== Live at Fillmore West (original edition) ===
Released August 1971

No.	Title	Writer(s)	Length
1.	"Memphis Soul Stew"	Curtis Ousley	7:41
2.	"A Whiter Shade of Pale"	Gary Brooker, Keith Reid, Matthew Fisher	5:26
3.	"Whole Lotta Love"	Willie Dixon, Robert Plant, Jimmy Page, John Paul Jones, John Bonham	2:16
4.	"I Stand Accused"	Jerry Butler	6:05
5.	"Them Changes"	Buddy Miles	7:01
6.	"Ode to Billie Joe"	Bobbie Gentry	3:22
7.	"Mr. Bojangles"	Jerry Jeff Walker	4:30
8.	"Signed, Sealed, Delivered I'm Yours"	Lee Garrett, Lula Mae Hardaway, Stevie Wonder, Syreeta Wright	2:37
9.	"Soul Serenade"	Luther Dixon, Curtis Ousley	5:32
Total length:			44:30

=== Live at Fillmore West (expanded edition) ===
Released July 11, 2006, featuring 5 additional tracks.

No.	Title	Writer(s)	Length
1.	"Memphis Soul Stew"	Curtis Ousley	7:41
2.	"A Whiter Shade of Pale"	Gary Brooker, Keith Reid, Matthew Fisher	5:26
3.	"Whole Lotta Love"	Led Zeppelin	2:16
4.	"I Stand Accused"	Jerry Butler	6:05
5.	"Them Changes"	Buddy Miles	7:01
6.	"Ode to Billie Joe"	Bobbie Gentry	3:22
7.	"Mr. Bojangles"	Jerry Jeff Walker	4:30
8.	"Signed, Sealed, Delivered I'm Yours"	Lee Garrett, Lula Mae Hardaway, Stevie Wonder, Syreeta Wright	2:37
9.	"Soul Serenade"	Luther Dixon, Curtis Ousley	5:32
10.	"My Sweet Lord"	George Harrison	2:33
11.	"Them Changes" (alternate take)	Buddy Miles	5:33
12.	"Ode to Billie Joe" (alternate take)	Bobbie Gentry	4:35
13.	"Soul Serenade" (alternate take)	Luther Dixon, Curtis Ousley	4:51
14.	"Memphis Soul Stew" (alternate take)	Curtis Ousley	5:05
Total length:			67:07

=== Don't Fight the Feeling: The Complete Aretha Franklin & King Curtis Live at Fillmore West ===
4 CD Box-set. Released May 3, 2005 by Rhino Handmade in a limited edition of 5000.

Disc one
No.	Title	Writer(s)	Artist	Length
1.	"Intro"
2.	"Knock on Wood"	Eddie Floyd, Steve Cropper	The Memphis Horns
3.	"Whole Lotta Love"		King Curtis
4.	"Them Changes"		King Curtis
5.	"A Whiter Shade of Pale"		King Curtis
6.	"My Sweet Lord"		Billy Preston
7.	"Ode to Billie Joe"		King Curtis
8.	"Mr Bojangles"		King Curtis
9.	"Soul Serenade"		King Curtis
10.	"Memphis Soul Stew"		King Curtis
11.	"Signed, Sealed, Delivered (I'm Yours)"		King Curtis
12.	"Respect"	Otis Redding	Aretha Franklin
13.	"Call Me"	Aretha Franklin	Aretha Franklin
14.	"Mixed-up Girl"	Jimmy Webb	Aretha Franklin
15.	"Love the One You're With"	Stephen Stills	Aretha Franklin
16.	"Bridge over Troubled Water"	Paul Simon	Aretha Franklin
17.	"Eleanor Rigby"	Lennon–McCartney	Aretha Franklin
18.	"Make It with You"	David Gates	Aretha Franklin
19.	"Don't Play That Song (You Lied)"	Ahmet Ertegun, Betty Nelson	Aretha Franklin

Disc two
No.	Title	Writer(s)	Artist	Length
20.	"Share Your Love with Me"	Alfred Braggs, Deadric Malone	Aretha Franklin
21.	"Dr. Feelgood (Love Is a Serious Business)"	Aretha Franklin, Ted White	Aretha Franklin
22.	"Spirit in the Dark"	Aretha Franklin	Aretha Franklin
23.	"Spirit in the Dark (reprise)"		Aretha Franklin
24.	"Knock on Wood"		The Memphis Horns
25.	"Them Changes"		King Curtis
26.	"Whole Lotta Love"		King Curtis
27.	"A Whiter Shade of Pale"		King Curtis
28.	"I Stand Accused"		King Curtis
29.	"Soul Serenade"		King Curtis
30.	"Memphis Soul Stew"		King Curtis
31.	"Respect"		Aretha Franklin
32.	"Call Me"		Aretha Franklin
33.	"Love the One You're With"		Aretha Franklin
34.	"Bridge over Troubled Water"		Aretha Franklin

Disc three
No.	Title	Writer(s)	Artist	Length
35.	"Share Your Love with Me"		Aretha Franklin
36.	"Eleanor Rigby"		Aretha Franklin
37.	"Make It with You"		Aretha Franklin
38.	"You're All I Need to Get By"	Nickolas Ashford, Valerie Simpson	Aretha Franklin
39.	"Don't Play That Song"		Aretha Franklin
40.	"Dr. Feelgood (Love Is a Serious Business)"		Aretha Franklin
41.	"Spirit in the Dark"		Aretha Franklin
42.	"Spirit in the Dark (reprise)"		Aretha Franklin
43.	"Knock on Wood"		The Memphis Horns
44.	"Them Changes"		King Curtis
45.	"A Whiter Shade of Pale"		King Curtis
46.	"Ode to Billie Joe"		King Curtis
47.	"Soul Serenade"		King Curtis
48.	"Memphis Soul Stew"		King Curtis

Disc four
No.	Title	Writer(s)	Artist	Length
49.	"Respect"		Aretha Franklin
50.	"Call Me"		Aretha Franklin
51.	"Love the One You're With"		Aretha Franklin
52.	"Bridge over Troubled Water"		Aretha Franklin
53.	"Share Your Love with Me"		Aretha Franklin
54.	"Eleanor Rigby"		Aretha Franklin
55.	"Make It with You"		Aretha Franklin
56.	"Don't Play That Song"		Aretha Franklin
57.	"You're All I Need to Get By"		Aretha Franklin
58.	"Dr. Feelgood (Love Is a Serious Business)"		Aretha Franklin
59.	"Spirit in the Dark"		Aretha Franklin
60.	"Spirit in the Dark (reprise)"		Aretha Franklin and Ray Charles
61.	"Reach Out and Touch (Somebody's Hand)"	Nickolas Ashford, Valerie Simpson	Aretha Franklin

== Chart performance ==
=== Album ===
Chart	Peak position
Billboard 200	54
Billboard Jazz Albums	3
Billboard Soul albums	9

=== Single ===
Title	Chart	Peak position
Whole Lotta Love	Billboard Hot 100	64
	Billboard Best Selling Soul singles	43

== Personnel ==
- King Curtis – tenor saxophone
- Cornell Dupree – electric guitar
- Jerry Jemmott – bass guitar
- Pancho Morales – congas
- Billy Preston – Hammond B-3 organ
- Bernard Purdie – drums
- Truman Thomas – electric piano

The Memphis Horns:

- Jack Hale – trombone
- Roger Hopps – trumpet
- Wayne Jackson – lead trumpet
- Andrew Love – tenor saxophone
- Jimmy Mitchell – baritone saxophone
