= An Anthology =

An Anthology may refer to:

- An Anthology (Angel album), 1992
- An Anthology (Duane Allman album), 1972
