= No Easy Way Down =

No Easy Way Down may refer to:

- "No Easy Way Down", a song from Hour Glass's self-titled 1967 album, first recorded by The Germz in 1967 for the Vertigo label and later by other artists, including Dusty Springfield in Dusty in Memphis (1969) and the song's co-writer Carole King in Writer (1970)
- "No Easy Way Down", a song from Explosions in the Glass Palace (1984) by Rain Parade
