= Skydog =

Skydog may refer to:

- Duane Allman, American musician, nicknamed "Skydog"
- Skydog: The Duane Allman Retrospective, an album of recordings by Allman
