= Live from A&R Studios =

Live album by the Allman Brothers Band
- Released: April 1, 2016
- Recorded: August 26, 1971
- Venues: A&R Studios, New York City
- Genres: Southern rock, blues, blues rock, jazz rock
- Length: 67:13
- Label: Allman Brothers Records
- Producer: The Allman Brothers Band

The Allman Brothers Band chronology
40 (2014)	Live from A&R Studios (2016)	The Fox Box (2017)

Live from A&R Studios is an album by the Allman Brothers Band. It was recorded on August 26, 1971, at A&R Studios in New York City for a live radio broadcast. It was released on April 1, 2016.

A bootleg recording of this concert had been circulated for years, and coveted by many fans. Originally, "You Don't Love Me" / "Soul Serenade" was released on the box set Dreams.

== Critical reception ==
Professional ratings
Review scores
Source	Rating
All About Jazz	4.5/5 stars
Uncut	4.5/5 stars

On Jambands.com, Larson Sutton said, "The nine-song program was inspired work, showcasing the conflagration of six musicians focused as one... The A&R show, presumably taped in droves by home stereos, was widely bootlegged, and in the following decades considered quite a treasure of both performance and historical context. To have it officially released, cleaned up and remastered to a high polish from the original broadcast tapes, is to put it finally in the proper place for all to hear; the magnificence of the Allman Brothers Band in one of its finest hours of its finest year of 1971."

In American Songwriter, Hal Horowitz wrote, "As those who already own this heavily bootlegged concert, recorded in front of a small audience at the titular studio can attest, the sextet was on fire this evening. And even though there were few surprises in the songs played (they had stayed pretty similar for about a year), the group charged through the material like they had everything to prove.... Moderate Brothers admirers can stick with the already released versions, but for those digging deeper into Duane’s sadly limited well of professionally recorded work with the band, this is absolutely essential listening."

In a review for All About Jazz, Doug Collette noted that the small performance space "required the band set itself up in something of a semi-circle, all the better to enhance the already uncannily sensitive, some might say, telepathic nature of their practiced improvisations." Regarding the album, he remarked: "it is not only an essential entry into the discography of the Allman Brothers Band, but should provide something of an indirect gateway into their storied musical heritage for the novice who wants to avoid the preconceptions that might arise from higher profile titles."

Uncut's Bud Scoppa stated that the musicians "were firing on all six cylinders, emphatically displaying their unique approach, a seamless fusion of tightly structured roadhouse blues and adventurous, musically elevated improvisation at once primal and sophisticated... nobody... could touch this heady, virtuosic crew on the concert stage, as denizens of the Fillmore East had discovered to their mind-blown delight during the previous year and a half."

Jaan Uhelszki of Relix wrote that the band had "a cocky swagger and a telepathic connection between them, pulling sounds out of each other's psyche, then building towering edifices of sound, attitude, grace and even a little impatience." She described "Medley: You Don't Love Me / Soul Serenade" as "the most spectacular moment" on the album, and called Duane Allman's solo on that track "a marvel of human emotion and genius technique."

== Track listing ==
1. "Statesboro Blues" (Blind Willie McTell) – 4:30
2. "Trouble No More" (McKinley Morganfield) – 4:04
3. "Don't Keep Me Wonderin'" (Gregg Allman) – 3:39
4. "Done Somebody Wrong" (Clarence L. Lewis, Elmore James, Morris Levy) – 3:43
5. "One Way Out" (Marshall Sehorn, Elmore James) – 4:48
6. "In Memory of Elizabeth Reed" (Dickey Betts) – 11:23
7. "Stormy Monday" (T-Bone Walker) – 8:48
8. Medley: "You Don't Love Me" / "Soul Serenade" (Willie Cobbs / Curtis Ousley, Luther Dixon) – 19:32
9. "Hot 'Lanta" (Gregg Allman, Duane Allman, Dickey Betts, Butch Trucks, Berry Oakley, Jai Johanny Johanson) – 6:46

== Personnel ==
The Allman Brothers Band

- Duane Allman – lead and slide guitar
- Gregg Allman – Hammond B-3 organ, piano, vocals
- Dickey Betts – lead guitar
- Berry Oakley – bass guitar
- Butch Trucks – drums, timpani
- Jaimoe – drums, percussion

Production

- Produced by the Allman Brothers Band
- Executive producer – Bert Holman
- Project supervisor – Bill Levenson
- Mixing – Suha Gur
- Liner notes – John Lynskey
- Package design – Terry Bradley
- Photos – Baron Wolman, W. Robert Johnson, Wayne Knight
