= Down to Earth (Willie Cobbs album) =

Studio album by Willie Cobbs
- Released: 1994
- Studios: Rooster Blues, Clarksdale, Mississippi
- Genres: Blues, soul
- Label: Rooster Blues
- Producers: Willie Cobbs, Jim O'Neal, Patty Johnson

Willie Cobbs chronology
Down to Earth (1994)	Pay or Do 11 Months and 29 Days (1998)

Down to Earth is the debut album by the American musician Willie Cobbs, released 1994. It is dedicated to his daughter, LaTasha. The album was nominated for a W. C. Handy Award for "Traditional Blues Album".

== Production ==
Produced by Cobbs, Jim O'Neal, and Patty Johnson, the album was recorded at the Rooster Blues studio, in Clarksdale, Mississippi. Cobbs worked on the songs for more than 10 years, composing them when he felt he had something to say rather than in scheduled writing sessions or under deadline. He thought that the lyrics told a story about the past three decades of his life. "You Don't Love Me" is a rerecorded version of Cobbs's most famous song, to which he added new lyrics. He was backed by members of O. V. Wright's old band, including L.C. Luckett and Johnny Rawls, who together cowrote four of the songs.

== Critical reception ==
Professional ratings
Review scores
Source	Rating
AllMusic	4.5/5 stars
Chicago Tribune	3/4 stars
MusicHound Blues: The Essential Album Guide	3/5 stars
The Penguin Guide to Blues Recordings	2.5/4 stars
Pittsburgh Post-Gazette	2.5/4 stars
The Rolling Stone Jazz & Blues Album Guide	3.5/5 stars
The Virgin Encyclopedia of the Blues	3/5 stars

The Chicago Tribune said that "Cobbs faithfully reprises his best-known composition, its familiar loping bass line and Cobbs's high-pitched vocal still packing a wallop." The Pittsburgh Post-Gazette stated that "Cobbs's vocals are gritty and soulful, even when he moves into the upper registers".

The Penguin Guide to Blues Recordings labeled Down to Earth "an uneasy blend of downhome blues and retro soul."

== Track listing ==
No.	Title	Length
1.	"Eatin' Dry Onions"
2.	"Goin' to Mississippi"
3.	"Butler Boy Blues"
4.	"She's Not the Same (Feeling Good)"
5.	"Amnesia"
6.	"My Baby Walked Away"
7.	"If You Don't Know What Love Is"
8.	"You Don't Love Me/Hey Little Girl"
9.	"Good Lovin'"
10.	"New Slow Down Baby"
11.	"Carnation Milk"
12.	"Stackhouse Rock"
13.	"Wanna Make Love to You"
