= Jerry Jemmott =

American bassist

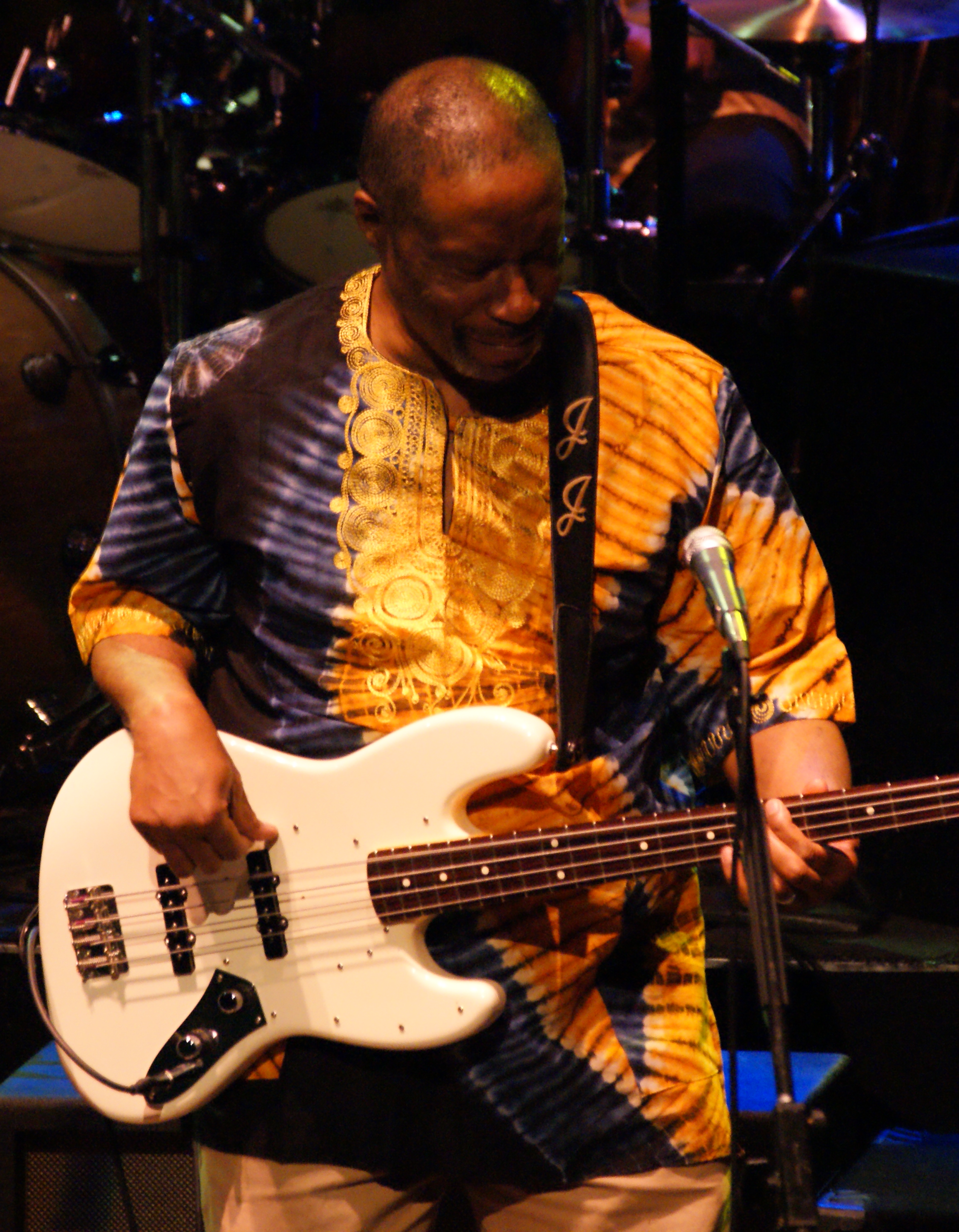
- Jemmott performing in 2009

Background information
- Born: Gerald Stenhouse Jemmott; March 22, 1946 (age 79); The Bronx, New York, U.S.
- Genres: Soul, R&B, blues, soul jazz, jazz
- Occupations: Musician, composer
- Instrument: Bass guitar
- Years active: 1958–present
- Labels: Atlantic, P-Vine, Whachagonnado?
- Website: jerryjemmott.com

Gerald Stenhouse Jemmott (born March 22, 1946) is an American bass guitarist. He was one of the chief session bassists of the late 1960s and early 1970s, working with many of the period's well-known soul, blues, and jazz artists. He has won two Grammy Awards.

== Biography ==
Born in Morrisania, Bronx, New York City, in 1946, Jerry Jemmott began playing upright (acoustic) bass at the age of eleven after he discovered Paul Chambers. After switching to electric bass guitar, he was discovered by saxophonist King Curtis in 1967. With his connection through Curtis to Atlantic Records, he soon began recording with other Atlantic recording artists, including Aretha Franklin, Ray Charles, Wilson Pickett, the Rascals, Roberta Flack, and Margie Joseph. He also recorded with B.B. King, Freddie King, Chuck Berry, Otis Rush, Champion Jack Dupree, and Mike Bloomfield, and accompanied Herbie Hancock, Freddie Hubbard, Erroll Garner, Les McCann, Eddie Harris, Houston Person, George Benson, Archie Shepp, Lionel Hampton, Herbie Mann, Eddie Palmieri, and Charles Earland. He played the bass line on the song "Mr. Bojangles" and contributed to B.B. King's "The Thrill Is Gone". Jemmott and Duane Allman would fly down to Muscle Shoals, to record for Atlantic. In 1971 King Curtis recorded his hit album, Live at Fillmore West with Jemmott, Bernard Purdie, Billy Preston, and other members of the Kingpins.

After a near-fatal 1972 auto accident in Manhattan that also involved Roberta Flack and guitarist Cornell Dupree, Jemmott temporarily quit playing bass due to injuries he sustained, but would return in 1975 in the midst of the closure of many of the recording studios, due to emergence of compact home recording studios that utilized the syncing of the drum machine with the synthesizer, the precursor to the decline of recording industry and the emerging acceptance of the sound of digital recordings. He continued to work in film and theater as an arranger and conductor with John Williams and the Boston Pops Orchestra. He was cited as a major influence by Jaco Pastorius, who incorporated Jemmott's funk bass lines into his own style. Jemmott hosted the instructional video Modern Electric Bass (1985) which featured advice from Pastorius.

Jemmott began his solo career in 1978, playing jazz, blues, R&B, reggae, and soul as Jerry Jemmott & Souler Energy, a group that over the years included Steve Berrios, Eric Gale, Neal Creque, Patience Higgins, Lou Marini, Seldon Powell, Bernard Purdie, Arlen Roth, and Melvin Sparks. Later he formed Jerry Jemmott's The Right Reverend Jakie Neckbone Jubilee Special, and performed a mix of his original "cool groove" songs with his classic hits, in addition to presenting his "Soul Kitchen" improvisation workshops and clinics. That band members were singers Tina Fabrique, Connie Fredericks - Malone, Frankie Paris, Angel Rissoff, Catherine Russell, and Stan Wright. Drummers Tony Thunder Smith, Tom Kaelin, and others. During this period he was also a member of the Jimmy Owens Quartet, who made several trips to Europe, the Middle East and Africa for the U.S State Department, along with Dizzy Gillespie, the Heath Brothers, and Sonny Fortune . The group included guitarist Eric "Fabulous J" Johnson, and drummer Daryl Washington (brother of Grover Washington Jr). During this period he got drummer Herbie Lovelle out of retirement to record Robert Johnson's music for producers Gene Heimlich and Clark Dimond. The album was Incarnation and it featured vocalist/actor Tucker Smallwood and guitarist Arlen Roth, guitarist Pat Conte, TC James on keyboards and Jemmott on bass. It was not released until 1994, then reissued in 2019 as "The Incarnation Blues Band" on Soulitude Records.

Jemmott recorded solo albums for P-Vine Records: Caught in the Low Beam and The New York View; and Make It Happen! for WhatchaGonnaDo Records. He has written articles, books, and released audio and video bass instruction materials. He is the recipient of the 2001 Bass Player magazine's Lifetime Achievement Award and Chairman of the Electric Bass Department at the Richard Davis Foundation for Young Bassists.

In 2006, he joined Gregg Allman's backing band ("Gregg Allman & Friends"), in addition to Cornell Dupree's Soul Survivors. That same year, he was one of many guests at The Allman Brothers Band's 40th anniversary at the Beacon Theatre in New York City. In 2014 he rejoined Aretha Franklin on the David Letterman Show performing "Rolling in The Deep". He developed a universally recognizable ColorSoundMusic Learning System envisioned by Herbie Lovelle that he teaches at his clinics and workshops.

In 2023, Jemmott published his autobiography, MAKE IT HAPPEN!: The Life and Times of "The Groovemaster", Bassist Jerry Jemmott, in collaboration with editor William Knoblauch.

== Discography ==
=== Solo ===
- New York View (P-Vine, 1995)
- Make It Happen! (Whatchagonnado?, 2005)
- Home Cookin' (Whatchagonnado?, 2006)
- Bass on the Case (Whachagonnado?, 2009)
- Addiction (Whachagonnado?, 2014)

=== As sideman ===
With Nina Simone

- Nina Simone Sings The Blues (RCA Records SP-3789, 1967)
- Ain't Got No, I Got Life (RCA Records – single, 1968)

With Erma Franklin

- Piece of My Heart (Shout Records S-221, 1967)

With Lorraine Ellison

- Stay With Me Baby (Warner Bros. Records, 1966)
- You Don't Know Nothing About Love (Warner Bros. Records, 1966)

With King Curtis

- Instant Groove (Atco,33-293, 1969)
- Live at Fillmore West (Atco 33-359, 1971)
- Everybody's Talkin' (Atco 33-385, 1971)

With King Curtis and Champion Jack Dupree

- Blues at Montreux (Atlantic SD1637, 1973)

With Lightnin' Rod

- Hustlers Convention (Celluloid, 1973)

With Carly Simon

- Carly Simon (Elektra Records, 1971)

With Al Kooper

- You Never Know Who Your Friends Are (Columbia Records, 1969)

With Aretha Franklin

- Aretha Now (Atlantic Records, 1968)
- Soul '69 (Atlantic Records, 1969)
- This Girl's In Love With You (Atlantic Records, 1970)
- Aretha Live at Fillmore West (Atlantic Records, 1971)
- Hey Now Hey (The Other Side of the Sky) (Atlantic Records, 1973)

With Janis Ian

- Who Really Cares (Verve, 1969)

With Freddie Hubbard

- A Soul Experiment (Atlantic Records SD-1526, 1968)

With George Benson

- Tell it Like it Is (A&M Records, 1968)
- The Other Side of Abbey Road (A&M Records, 1970)

With Wilson Pickett

- The Midnight Mover (Atlantic Records, 1968)
- Hey Jude (Atlantic Records, 1969)

With Gil Scott Heron

- The Revolution Will Not Be Televised (Flying Dutchman, 1971)

With Mike Bloomfield and Al Kooper

- Fillmore East: The Lost Concert Tapes 12–13–68 (Columbia Records, 2003)

With Candido Camero

- Beautiful (Blue Note Records, 1970)

With Hank Crawford

- Mr. Blues Plays Lady Soul (Atlantic Records, 1969)

With Ben E. King

- Supernatural (Atlantic Records, 1975)

With Archie Shepp

- Attica Blues (ABC Records AS-9222, 1972)

With Eddie Harris

- Second Movement (Atlantic Records, 1971) with Les McCann

With Richard Groove Holmes

- Comin' on Home (Blue Note Records, 1971)
- American Pie (Groove Merchant, 1972)

With B.B. King

° Live and Well (ABC Records, 1968)

- Completely Well (ABC Records, 1969)
- Indianola Mississippi Seeds (ABC Records, 1970)
- Guess Who (ABC Records, 1972)

With Herbie Mann

- Turtle Bay (Atlantic Records, 1973)

With Laura Nyro

- Walk the Dog and Light the Light (Columbia Records, 1993)

With Houston Person

- Houston Express (Prestige, 1970)

With Shirley Scott

- Shirley Scott & the Soul Saxes (Atlantic Records, 1969)

With The Thad Jones & Mel Lewis Orchestra

- New Life (Horizon, SP-707, 1976)
