= Mar y Sol: The First International Puerto Rico Pop Festival =

Live album by Various artists
- Released: 1972
- Recorded: April 1–4, 1972
- Genre: Rock
- Length: 89:21
- Label: Atlantic Records
- Producer: Tunc Erim

Mar y Sol: The First International Puerto Rico Pop Festival is the live album of the 1972 Mar y Sol Pop Festival. Released on Atlantic Records label as a set of 2 LPs in 1972. This album was never released on CD. Some tracks from this album were later released by their respective performers including Allman Brothers Band, John Baldry, Cactus, Emerson, Lake & Palmer, Mahavishnu Orchestra and Nitzinger.

== Track listing ==
Side 1

1. The J. Geils Band – "Lookin' for a Love" – 5:16
2. The Mahavishnu Orchestra with John McLaughlin – "The Noonward Race" – 13:20
3. Dr. John – "Wang Dang Doodle" – 5:10

Side 2

1. B. B. King – "Why I Sing the Blues" – 6:12
2. Osibisa – "Y Sharp" – 8:34 (mistakenly labeled as "Do You Know")
3. Cactus – "Bedroom Mazurka" – 5:00

Side 3

1. The Allman Brothers Band – "Ain't Wastin' Time No More" – 4:59
2. Emerson, Lake & Palmer – "Take a Pebble" / "Lucky Man" – 7:33
3. John Nitzinger – "Texas Blues" / "Jelly Roll" – 9:18

Side 4

1. Jonathan Edwards – "Sometimes in the Morning" – 4:15
2. Jonathan Edwards – "Train of Glory" – 3:35
3. John Baldry – "Bring My Baby Back" – 6:22
4. Herbie Mann – "Respect Yourself" – 9:22

== Promotional sampler ==
A 3-song sampler/EP was released with the same album art as the LP but in black and white.

- Side 1
1. Emerson, Lake & Palmer – Take a Pebble/Lucky Man – 7:33
- Side 2
1. The J. Geils Band – Looking For A Love – 5:16
2. Jonathan Edwards – Sometimes In The Morning – 4:15

== Tracks released in other albums ==
Some artists released their songs on their own albums.

- Ain't Wastin' Time No More (Allman Brothers Band) was released on Dreams (1989)
- Take a Pebble (ELP) was released by Greg Lake on The Greg Lake Retrospective: From The Beginning (1997).
- Texas Blues/Jelly Roll (Nitzinger) was released on the import version of One Foot in History (1999) and on the import boxed-set John in the Box (2002)
- Bedroom Mazurka (Cactus) was released on Fully Unleashed: The Live Gigs (2004)
- Bring My Baby Back (John Baldry) was released on the re-released version of Everything Stops for Tea (2005) and on Boogie Woogie: The Warner Bros. Recordings (2005)
- The Noonward Race (The Mahavishnu Orchestra) was released on the re-released version of The Best Of The Mahavishnu Orchestra (2011) and the boxed-set Original Line up, The Complete Columbia Albums Collection (2011)
