= Soul Serenade (King Curtis song) =

1968 song by Willie Mitchell

Song by King Curtis

from the album Soul Serenade
- Released: 1964
- Genre: Smooth jazz
- Label: Capitol Records
- Songwriter: Curtis Ousley/Luther Dixon

"Soul Serenade"

Song by Willie Mitchell

from the album Soul Serenade
- Released: January 1968
- Recorded: 1967
- Genre: Jazz
- Label: Hi
- Songwriter: Curtis Ousley/Luther Dixon

"Soul Serenade" is a jazz instrumental written by King Curtis (Curtis Ousley) and Luther Dixon. Curtis played the lead on a B-flat saxello, a version of the soprano sax. The song was released on Curtis' 1964 album "Soul Serenade".

== Charts ==
Chart performance for "Soul Serenade"
Chart (2025)	Peak position
Jamaica Airplay (JAMMS)	6

== Cover versions ==
- Aretha Franklin on I Never Loved a Man the Way I Love You (1967)
- Willie Mitchell, backed by Cannonball Adderley's "Mercy, Mercy, Mercy"; It peaked at #43 in the UK Singles Chart in April 1968.
- The Allman Brothers Band, woven into a performance of Willie Cobbs' "You Don't Love Me" during a concert, "Live from A&R Studios", held in Manhattan on August 26, 1971, and broadcast by WPLJ-FM. The song was released on the band's Dreams compilation in 1989.
- The Derek Trucks Band on Soul Serenade (2003) and Songlines Live (DVD, 2006)
- Gloria Lynne
- Maxine Brown
- David Sanborn
- Jeff Golub
