= Share Your Love with Me =

Song by Alfred Braggs and Deadric Malone

Single by Bobby "Blue" Bland

from the album Call on Me
- B-side: "After It's Too Late"
- Released: May 1964
- Genre: Blues
- Length: 2:36
- Label: Duke Records 377
- Songwriters: Alfred Braggs, Deadric Malone
- Producer: Ronnie Shannon

Bobby "Blue" Bland singles chronology
"Ain´t Nothing You Can Do" (1964)	"Share Your Love with Me" (1964)	"Ain´t Doing Too Bad (Part 1)" (1964)

"Share Your Love with Me" is a song written by Alfred Braggs and Deadric Malone. It was originally recorded by blues singer Bobby "Blue" Bland. Over the years, the song has been covered by various artists, most notably Aretha Franklin who won a Grammy Award for her 1969 rendition. Other artists who covered the song include The Band in 1973, Kenny Rogers in 1981, and most recently, Van Morrison in 2016.

== Bobby "Blue" Bland version ==
Bobby "Blue" Bland recorded the song for his 1963 album, Call on Me. His version peaked at #42 on the Billboard Hot 100 and #5 on the Hot Rhythm & Blues Singles chart. It also reached #15 in Canada.

=== Chart performance ===
Chart (1964)	Peak position
Canada RPM Top Singles	15
US Billboard Hot 100	42
U.S. Cashbox Hot Rhythm & Blues Singles	5

== Aretha Franklin version ==
"Share Your Love with Me"

Single by Aretha Franklin

from the album This Girl's in Love with You
- B-side: "Pledging My Love"/The Clock"
- Released: July 1969
- Studio: Atlantic Studios (New York, NY)
- Genre: Soul
- Length: 3:21
- Label: Atlantic Records 2650
- Songwriters: Alfred Braggs, Deadric Malone
- Producers: Tom Dowd, Arif Mardin, Jerry Wexler

Aretha Franklin singles chronology
"I Can't See Myself Leaving You" (1969)	"Share Your Love with Me" (1969)	"Today I Sing the Blues" (1969)

Aretha Franklin recorded the song for her 1970 album, This Girl's in Love with You. Her single spent five weeks at number-one on the Best Selling Soul Singles chart and peaked at #13 on the Billboard Hot 100 on September 13, 1969. The song earned Franklin a Grammy Award for Best R&B Vocal Performance, Female in 1970. In March 1971 Aretha recorded two live versions of the song during her three-day concert at the Fillmore West in San Francisco; one of the two version is on the 2006 deluxe edition of Aretha Live at Fillmore West, and both versions are on the 2005 remastered Don't Fight The Feeling: The Complete Aretha Franklin & King Curtis Live at Fillmore West.

=== Chart performance ===
Chart (1969)	Peak position
US Billboard Hot 100	13
U.S. Billboard Best Selling Soul Singles	1

== Kenny Rogers version ==
"Share Your Love with Me"

Single by Kenny Rogers

from the album Share Your Love
- B-side: "Greybeard"
- Released: September 7, 1981
- Genre: Country
- Length: 3:19
- Label: Liberty
- Songwriters: Alfred Braggs, Deadric Malone
- Producer: Lionel Richie

Kenny Rogers singles chronology
"I Don't Need You" (1981)	"Share Your Love with Me" (1981)	"Blaze of Glory" (1981)

Kenny Rogers recorded this song for his 1981 album, Share Your Love. It was released in September 1981 as the second single from the album. His version, featuring Gladys Knight & the Pips, peaked at #14 on the Billboard Hot 100 and #5 on the Hot Country Singles chart. Rogers' version also reached number one on the Adult Contemporary Singles chart.

=== Chart performance ===
Chart (1981)	Peak position
Canadian RPM Country Tracks	2
Canadian RPM Adult Contemporary Tracks	5
US Billboard Hot 100	14
US Hot Country Songs (Billboard)	5
US Adult Contemporary (Billboard)	1

== Other versions ==
Other versions have been recorded by Johnny Adams, the Band, Shirley Brown, Hope Clarke, Freddy Fender, The Fantastic Four, Lonnie Mack, Van Morrison, Charlie Rich, Phoebe Snow, and Susan Tedeschi.

== See also ==
- List of number-one R&B singles of 1969 (U.S.)
- List of number-one adult contemporary singles of 1981 (U.S.)
