= Down Along the Cove =

Song by Bob Dylan

from the album John Wesley Harding
- Released: December 27, 1967
- Recorded: November 29, 1967
- Studio: Columbia Studio A (Nashville, Tennessee)
- Genre: Country rock
- Length: 2:23
- Label: Columbia
- Songwriter(s): Bob Dylan
- Producer(s): Bob Johnston

"Down Along the Cove" is a song written and originally performed by Bob Dylan for his album John Wesley Harding. Dylan recorded the song in one take at Columbia's Studio A, Nashville, on November 29, 1967.

== Structure and instrumentation ==
"Down Along the Cove" features minimal instrumentation and a 12-bar country blues style. The song includes Bob Dylan on piano and Peter Drake on pedal steel guitar.

== Live performances ==
Dylan debuted this song at the EMU Ballroom on the University of Oregon campus in Eugene, Oregon, on June 14, 1999. Dylan played the song with some regularity beginning in 2003 until the song's last live performance to date in Rome, Italy on June 16, 2006, performing it a total of 83 times. A live version performed at the Bonnaroo Music Festival in 2004 was the b-side to Dylan's 2009 single "Beyond Here Lies Nothin'".

== Cover versions ==
"Down Along the Cove" has been covered several times. British folk artist Davey Graham covered the song on his 1969 album, Hat, Epic recording artists West covered it on their 1969 album "Bridges", and Georgie Fame also recorded the song in late 1970s. His version appears on the compilation record Somebody Stole My Summer. The song was also covered by Johnny Jenkins on his critically acclaimed and influential electric blues album Ton-Ton Macoute! in 1970, featuring Duane Allman on slide guitar.
