= Ton-Ton Macoute! =

Studio album by Johnny Jenkins
- Released: April 1970
- Recorded: 1969–70
- Genres: Blues rock Southern rock Classic rock
- Length: 48:07
- Labels: Atco, Capricorn
- Producers: Duane Allman, Johnny Sandlin

Johnny Jenkins chronology
Ton-Ton Macoute! (1970)	Blessed Blues (1996)

Professional ratings
Review scores
Source	Rating
AllMusic	4.5/5 stars
Christgau's Record Guide	B−

Ton-Ton Macoute! is the 1970 debut solo album of American blues musician Johnny Jenkins. Jenkins had previously led The Pinetoppers, a band that once featured Otis Redding. Jenkins then appeared on two Redding albums, playing guitar, before releasing his solo debut.

Ton-Ton Macoute! was originally intended as a Duane Allman solo album before Allman departed to form The Allman Brothers Band. Most of the guitar tracks were played by Allman, with Jenkins later supplying the vocal tracks. In addition to Duane Allman, the album also features three other founding members of the Allman Brothers: Berry Oakley, Jaimoe, and Butch Trucks.

Ton-Ton Macoute! is a blend of blues rock and Southern rock. It notably included covers of Dr. John's "I Walk on Guilded Splinters", Bob Dylan's "Down Along the Cove", and J.D. Loudermilk's "Bad News".

== Title ==
In Haitian Creole, Ton-Ton Macoute means "bogeyman" (literally: "Uncle Gunnysack"). The bogeyman in Haitian folklore was said to enter homes and kidnap disobedient children, taking them away in his gunnysack.

Ton-Ton Macoute was also the name of Haitian President Papa Doc Duvalier's secret police force, which was credited with widespread human rights violations.

== Track listing ==
1. "I Walk on Guilded Splinters" (Dr. John) - 5:49
2. "Leaving Trunk" (Sleepy John Estes) - 4:19
3. "Blind Bats & Swamp Rats" (Jackie Avery) - 4:44
4. "Rollin' Stone" (Muddy Waters) - 5:21 (a.k.a. "Catfish Blues")
5. "Sick and Tired" (Dave Bartholomew, Chris Kenner) - 4:41
6. "Down Along the Cove" (Bob Dylan) - 3:25
7. "Bad News" (J.D. Loudermilk) - 4:08
8. "Dimples" (John Lee Hooker, James Bracken) - 2:55
9. "Voodoo in You" (Jackie Avery) - 5:00
10. "I Don't Want No Woman" (Don Robey) - 2:12
11. "My Love Will Never Die" (Otis Rush) - 5:33

== Personnel ==
- Johnny Jenkins - vocals, guitar (4), harmonica (2, 6, 7, 8), foot stomping (4), lead guitar (10, 11)
- Duane Allman - electric guitar (9 [left channel]), slide guitar (4, 6), dobro (1), rhythm guitar (10, 11)
- Berry Oakley - bass (4, 6, 7)
- Jaimoe - timbales (1, 3, 9)
- Butch Trucks - drums (1, 9)
- Paul Hornsby - Wurlitzer piano (1, 2, 3, 6, 7, 9, 11), piano (10), Hammond B-3 organ (11), rhythm guitar (6)
- Eddie Hinton - cowbell (9)
- Tippy Armstrong - cabasa (9)
- Pete Carr - acoustic guitar (6), electric guitar (1, 9 [right channel]), guitar (2, 3, 5, 7, 8)
- Robert Popwell - bass (1, 2, 3, 5, 8, 9, 10, 11), timbales (5), shaker & woodblocks (2)
- Johnny Wyker - shaker & woodblocks (2)
- Jimmy Nalls - guitar (7)
- Ella Brown - vocals (3)
- Southern Comfort - vocals (1, 9) - a group that included Donna Jean Godchaux, then named Donna Thatcher
- Johnny Sandlin - drums (2, 3, 5, 6, 7, 8, 10, 11)

== Production ==
- Producer: Duane Allman, Johnny Sandlin
- Recording Engineer: Johnny Sandlin, Tom Compton, Larry Hall, Larry Hamby, Jim Hawkins, Jimmy Johnson, Terry Manning
- Assistant Engineer: Kent Bruce, Jeremy Stephens
- Remixing: Jeff Coppage
- Mastering: Denny Purcell
- Art Direction: Jimmy Roberts
- Photography: Jimmy Roberts
- Liner Notes: Johnny Sandlin
