= Memphis Soul Stew =

Song by King Curtis

Single by King Curtis

from the album King Size Soul
- B-side: "Blue Nocturne"
- Released: 1967
- Recorded: 1967
- Genre: Instrumental rock; soul
- Length: 2:55
- Label: Atco
- Songwriter: King Curtis
- Producer: Tommy Cogbill

King Curtis singles chronology
"Jump Back" (1967)	"Memphis Soul Stew" (1967)	"Ode to Billie Joe" (1967)

"Memphis Soul Stew" is a song by American saxophonist and bandleader King Curtis.

The track is a narrative that describes the Memphis Soul sound in terms of a cooking recipe, with each instrument introduced by Curtis. This includes "fatback drums", "a pinch of organ" and "a half-pint of horns".

Curtis' original version, recorded at American Sound Studio in Memphis, was released as a single on Atco Records in 1967, and became a top 50 hit. A live version, recorded at the Fillmore West in 1971, shortly before Curtis' death, was released on his live album Live at Fillmore West.

In 2008, Bill Bailey chose the song to appear on Desert Island Discs.

Jazz saxophonist Michael Lington covered the track on his 2014 album Soul Appeal.
