= Power of Love (Hour Glass album) =

Studio album by Hour Glass
- Released: March 1968
- Recorded: January–February 1968
- Length: 33:51 (1968 release) / 53:04 (1992 re-release)
- Label: Liberty
- Producer: Dallas Smith

Hour Glass chronology
Hour Glass (1967)	Power of Love (1968)	The Hour Glass (1973)

Professional ratings
Review scores
Source	Rating
Allmusic	4/5 stars

Power of Love is the second studio album by Hour Glass, issued in March 1968 on Liberty Records, the final by the group with the namesakes of The Allman Brothers Band. After the failure of their first album, Liberty Records allowed a greater independence for the group, who had been virtually shut out of the decision making for their first album by the label and producer Dallas Smith. However, with the label's decision to retain Smith as producer, the group, especially Duane Allman, once again felt constricted by their label's expectations for the album.

With Smith behind the boards, Gregg Allman was still the focus. The younger Allman, who had seen only one of his compositions on the previous album, contributed seven of the twelve tracks. The remainder were two from Marlon Greene and Eddie Hinton and one each from the teams of Spooner Oldham and Dan Penn, John Berry and Don Covay, and John Lennon and Paul McCartney. The group performed all of the instrumentation, with Duane Allman adding electric sitar to their cover of The Beatles' "Norwegian Wood (This Bird Has Flown)", a staple of their live act.

Neil Young of Buffalo Springfield wrote the liner notes, describing his experience sitting in on the session for the album track "To Things Before", watching Gregg Allman leading the group through the number.

After the failure of the album to enter the chart, the Hour Glass traveled to Fame Studios in Muscle Shoals, Alabama, in an attempt to further refine their sound. However, Dallas Smith and Liberty Records were displeased with the group-produced blues-fueled rock tracks that the group returned to Los Angeles with, as they were light years away from the pop music Smith envisioned them performing. Additionally, seeing himself cut out of the group's picture was not ideal for Smith, even if his relations with the group had been strained.

Hour Glass disbanded shortly thereafter, with Gregg Allman returning to California to satisfy the terms of the group's contract with Liberty. Paired with a studio band, Allman recorded roughly an album's worth of material, though it took nearly a quarter of a century for it to surface.

The album is currently available on the Hour Glass anthology. The 1992 reissue on EMI, rife with bonus tracks from the aborted sessions for a Gregg Allman solo release, has fallen out of print. The bonus tracks are now available on the 2004 album Southbound.

== Track listing ==
1. "Power of Love" (Spooner Oldham, Dan Penn) - 2:50
2. "Changing of the Guard" - 2:33
3. "To Things Before" - 2:33
4. "I'm Not Afraid" - 2:41
5. "I Can Stand Alone" - 2:13
6. "Down in Texas" (Marlon Greene, Eddie Hinton) - 3:07
7. "I Still Want Your Love" - 2:20
8. "Home for the Summer" (Marlon Greene, Eddie Hinton) - 2:44
9. "I'm Hanging Up My Heart for You" (John Berry, Don Covay) - 3:09
10. "Going Nowhere" - 2:43
11. "Norwegian Wood (This Bird Has Flown)" (John Lennon, Paul McCartney) - 2:59
12. "Now Is the Time" - 3:59
13. "Down in Texas" (alternate version) (Marlon Greene, Eddie Hinton) - 2:21
14. "It's Not My Cross to Bear" - 3:36
15. "Southbound" - 3:41
16. "God Rest His Soul" (Steve Alaimo (Note: In chapter 4 of his autobiography My Cross To Bear, Gregg Allman says that he wrote "God Rest His Soul" but he sold the songwriting credit to Steve Alaimo.)) - 4:02
17. "February 3rd" (Composer Unknown) - 2:56
18. "Apollo 8" (Composer Unknown) - 2:37
- All songs by Gregg Allman, unless noted.
  - Tracks 1–12 constitute the original album.
    - Tracks 13–18 from the 1969 sessions for Gregg Allman's unreleased first solo album for Liberty (present on 1992 re-release only).

== Personnel ==
- Gregg Allman – organ, piano, guitar, vocal (all tracks)
- Duane Allman – guitars, electric sitar (tracks 1–6, 8–12)
- Paul Hornsby – piano, organ, guitar, vocal (tracks 1–12)
- Johnny Sandlin – drums, guitar, gong (tracks 1–12)
- Pete Carr – bass guitar, vocal (tracks 1–12), guitar (track 7)
- Several unknown studio musicians on horns, guitars, backing vocals, drums, bass guitar, keyboards and percussion (tracks 13–18)
- Bruce Ellison – engineer (all tracks)
