= It's Not My Cross to Bear =

Song by The Allman Brothers Band

from the album The Allman Brothers Band
- Released: November 4, 1969
- Recorded: 1969
- Genre: Electric Blues; Southern rock
- Length: 5:04
- Label: Capricorn
- Songwriter(s): Gregg Allman
- Producer(s): Adrian Barber

"It's Not My Cross to Bear" is a song by the Allman Brothers Band, written by Gregg Allman, that was released on their 1969 debut album. The song was written about a former lover. It was also one of the first songs Allman introduced to the group. In 1986, Allman recorded an arrangement for his record, I'm No Angel.

== Blues resemblance ==
The song conveys the feel and tone of a blues song, but does not follow any of the usual eight-bar blues or twelve-bar blues progressions. The song has harmonic resemblance to Howlin' Wolf's recordings of "Sitting on Top of the World" in its inclusion of a minor IV chord in the fourth measure of the progression, while also harmonically resembling "Trouble in Mind", a blues standard. The eight-bar blues progression in "It's Not My Cross to Bear" is played using B major as the tonic chord:

I^{7}	I^{7}	IV^{7}	iv^{7}
I VI	II V^{7}	I^{7}	V
