= Hour Glass (Hour Glass album) =

Studio album by Hour Glass
- Released: October 1967
- Recorded: June–August 1967
- Genres: White soul; Southern soul; psychedelic pop
- Length: 31:53 (1967 release) / 51:59 (1992 re-release)
- Label: Liberty
- Producer: Dallas Smith

Hour Glass chronology
Hour Glass (1967)	Power of Love (1968)

Singles from Hour Glass
- 1. "Nothing But Tears" / "Heartbeat" Released: October 1967; 2. "I've Been Trying" / "Silently" Released: January 1969 (as Greg Allman & the Hour Glass)

Professional ratings
Review scores
Source	Rating
Allmusic	4/5 stars

Hour Glass is the debut studio album by the group of the same name, issued in October 1967 on Liberty Records. The band featured Gregg Allman and his brother Duane Allman, who later formed The Allman Brothers Band.

The album was recorded by Dallas Smith, a producer noted for his work with Bobby Vee, but the band disliked his production work on the album. Smith knew the group was from the South, knew they had formed from the ashes of groups that had performed lots of blues covers, and could hear the soulful qualities in the voice of nineteen-year-old Gregg Allman. He therefore regarded them as a soul act and referred to them as a "Motown band", much to the chagrin of the group.

Hour Glass was recorded with an emphasis on lead vocalist Gregg's voice and dispensing with nearly all original material. Of the eleven tracks on the original LP, only one was penned by a group member: Gregg Allman's "Got To Get Away". The remaining ten were written by songwriters such as Curtis Mayfield, Jackson Browne, Del Shannon and Goffin/King. The Hour Glass performed the basic tracks, which were overdubbed by Smith with layers of vocals and instrumentation.

The album was a failure in both sales terms and in properly showcasing the group. On the follow-up, 1968's Power of Love, the group would be given a bigger role in the making of the album.

== Track listing ==
1. "Out of the Night" (Alex Moore, Bob Welch) - 1:57
2. "Nothing But Tears" (Jimmy Radcliffe, B. J. Scott) - 2:28
3. "Love Makes the World Go 'Round" (Deon Jackson) - 2:42
4. "Cast off All My Fears" (Jackson Browne) - 3:31
5. "I've Been Trying" (Curtis Mayfield) - 2:40
6. "No Easy Way Down" (Gerry Goffin, Carole King) - 3:20
7. "Heartbeat" (Ed Cobb) - 4:52
8. "So Much Love" (Gerry Goffin, Carole King) - 2:57
9. "Got to Get Away" (Gregg Allman) - 2:14
10. "Silently" (Dan Bourgoise, Del Shannon) - 2:48
11. "Bells" (Edgar Allan Poe, arr. Peter Alin) - 2:24
12. "In a Time" (Paul Hornsby) - 2:17
13. "I've Been Trying" (alternate version) (Curtis Mayfield) - 2:35
14. "Kind of a Man" (Jimmy Settle and Frank Bugbee) - 3:07
15. "D-I-V-O-R-C-E" (Bobby Braddock, Curly Putman) - 3:12
16. "She Is My Woman" (Composer Unknown) - 2:38
17. "Bad Dream" (Gregg Allman) - 3:37
18. "Three Time Loser" (Don Covay, Ronald Miller) - 2:40
- Tracks 1–11 constitute the original album.
- Tracks 12–13 are outtakes from the album.
- Tracks 14–18 are tracks from aborted 1968 and 1969 sessions by Gregg Allman (present on 1992 re-release only).

== Personnel ==
- Gregg Allman – organ, piano, vocal
- Duane Allman – guitars, vocal (tracks 1–13)
- Paul Hornsby – piano, organ, vocal (tracks 1–13)
- Johnny Sandlin – drums (tracks 1–13)
- Mabron McKinney – bass (tracks 1–13)
- Several unknown studio musicians on horns, guitars, backing vocals, drums, bass, banjo, keyboards and percussion (tracks 14-18)
