= King Curtis =

American saxophonist (1934–1971)

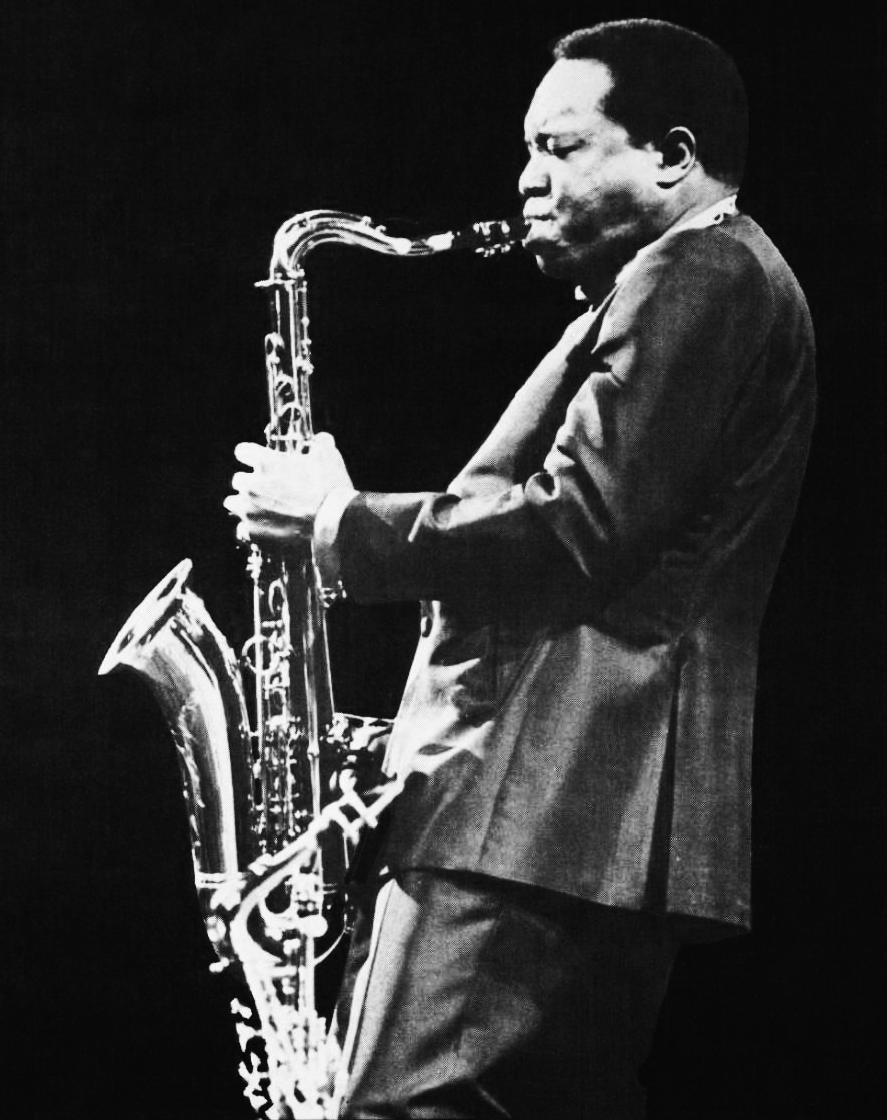
- King Curtis, from an advertisement for his 1971 single "Whole Lotta Love"

Background information
- Also known as: Curtis Ousley
- Born: Curtis Montgomery; February 7, 1934; Fort Worth, Texas, U.S.
- Died: August 13, 1971 (aged 37) New York City, U.S.
- Genres: R&B; jazz; rock and roll
- Occupations: Musician, bandleader, producer
- Instrument: Saxophone
- Years active: 1950–1971
- Labels: Atco, Atlantic, Prestige, Capitol

Curtis Ousley (born Curtis Montgomery, February 7, 1934 – August 13, 1971), known professionally as King Curtis, was an American saxophonist who played rhythm and blues, jazz, and rock and roll. A bandleader, band member, and session musician, he was also a musical director and record producer. A master of the instrument, he played tenor, alto, and soprano saxophone. He played riffs and solos on hit singles such as "Respect" by Aretha Franklin (1967), and "Yakety Yak" by the Coasters (1958) and his own "Soul Twist" (1962), "Soul Serenade" (1964), and "Memphis Soul Stew" (1967).

== Early life ==
King Curtis was born in Fort Worth, Texas, the son of Ethel Montgomery, and was adopted, with his sister Josephine Allen (died 2019), by Josie and William Ousley, whose last name he used throughout his life. Curtis attended I.M. Terrell High School, and studied and performed music with schoolmate Ornette Coleman (1930–2015).

== Career ==
Curtis started playing saxophone at the age of twelve in the Fort Worth area. He took interest in many musical genres including jazz, rhythm and blues, and popular music. As a student pursuing music, he turned down college scholarships in order to join the Lionel Hampton Band. During his time with Hampton, he was able to write and arrange music and learn guitar. In 1952 Curtis decided to move to New York and became a session musician, recording for such labels as Prestige, Enjoy, Capitol, and Atco. He recorded with Nat Adderley, Wynton Kelly, Buddy Holly, and Andy Williams, as well as playing on Waylon Jennings' first ever recording in 1958.

Stylistically, Curtis took inspiration from saxophonists Lester Young, Louis Jordan, Illinois Jacquet, Earl Bostic, and Gene Ammons. Known for his syncopated and percussive style, he was both versatile and powerful as a musician. He put together a group during his time as a session musician that included Richard Tee, Cornell Dupree, Jerry Jemmott, and Bernard Purdie.

"Soul Meeting"
Title track from Soul Meeting (1960)

=== Move into rock ===
Curtis enjoyed playing both jazz and rhythm and blues, but decided he would make more money as a rhythm and blues musician. In a 1971 interview with Charlie Gillett he said: "I love the authentic rhythm and blues more than anything, and I also like to live well." From the 1950s until the mid-1960s, he worked as a session musician, recording under his own name and with others such as The Coasters, with whom he recorded "Yakety Yak" and "Charlie Brown", among others. Buddy Holly hired him for session work, during which they recorded "Reminiscing." Holly wrote this song, but gave Curtis the songwriting credit for flying down to the session. His best-known singles from this period are "Soul Twist"—his highest-charting single, reaching number one on the R&B chart and number 17 on the Billboard pop chart—and "Soul Serenade." He provided backing on a number of songs for LaVern Baker, including her 1958 hit single "I Cried a Tear", where his saxophone became "a second voice".

In 1965 he moved to Atlantic Records and recorded his most successful singles, "Memphis Soul Stew" and "Ode to Billie Joe" (both 1967). In 1966 Curtis recorded three songs with Jimi Hendrix, "Linda Lou", "Baby How About You" and "I Can't Take It". Unissued, the tapes were later destroyed in a fire at Atlantic's master tape library. He worked with The Coasters, and led Aretha Franklin's backing band the Kingpins. The Kingpins opened for the Beatles during their 1965 performance at Shea Stadium. Curtis produced records, often working with Jerry Wexler, and recorded for Enjoy and Capitol during this period. One of his Atco recordings included the Joe South song "Games People Play" (1969) featuring guitarist Duane Allman. A very unique session came in 1963, when Curtis provided the honking sax backing for Mad Magazine's novelty burping record, "It's a Gas".

In March 1971 he appeared with Aretha Franklin and the Kingpins at the Fillmore West, which resulted in two live albums: Aretha Live at Fillmore West, and Curtis' own Live at Fillmore West. (A Whiter Shade of Pale from this album was used for the opening credit sequence the 1987 film Withnail and I.) In July 1971, Curtis recorded saxophone solos on "It's So Hard" and "I Don't Wanna Be a Soldier" from John Lennon's Imagine. Along with the Rimshots, he recorded the original theme song for the 1971 hit television show Soul Train, titled "Hot Potatoes".

On June 17, 1971, Curtis played at the Montreux Jazz Festival, in the Casino Kursaal, with Champion Jack Dupree, backed by Cornell Dupree on guitar, Jerry Jemmott on bass and Oliver Jackson on drums. The recording of the concert was later released as the 1973 album King Curtis & Champion Jack Dupree – Blues at Montreux on the Atlantic label.

== Death ==
Curtis was stabbed late on the night of August 12, 1971, during an argument with Juan Montanez, who was loitering with an unidentified female on the front steps of an apartment Curtis owned at 50 West 86th Street, Manhattan. The central air conditioning system was tripping the breaker in the rental's fusebox, which Curtis was attempting to access when he confronted Montanez. When Montanez refused to move from the entrance, a fight ensued with Montanez stabbing Curtis before Curtis took the knife away and stabbed Montanez four times. Curtis was transferred to Roosevelt Hospital, where he died early on the morning of August 13, 1971. In March 1972, Montanez had his charge reduced from second degree murder to second degree manslaughter in exchange for pleading guilty. He was released on December 5, 1977, from the Wallkill Correctional Facility for good behavior.

On the day of Curtis's funeral, Atlantic Records closed their offices. Jesse Jackson administered the service and as the mourners filed in, Curtis's band, the Kingpins, played "Soul Serenade". Among those attending were Ousley's immediate family, including sister Josephine Ousley Allen, other family members, Aretha Franklin, Cissy Houston, Brook Benton and Duane Allman. Franklin sang the closing spiritual "Never Grow Old" and Stevie Wonder performed "Abraham, Martin and John and now King Curtis". Allman went on to honor Curtis by interweaving a medley of "Soul Serenade" into the band's rendition of "You Don't Love Me", first in a show at the Academy of Music on East 14th Street in Manhattan on August 15, and later during a live in-studio recording at A&R Studios in Manhattan on August 26, recorded for posterity and released on LP/CD as part of the band's Dreams compilation in 1989.

== Portrayals ==
In the film The Buddy Holly Story (1978), King Curtis was played by actor Craig White. He appears in the scene at New York's Apollo Theater, which would have taken place between August 16–22, 1957 during Holly's Irvin Feld Tour. In the television series Genius: Aretha Franklin he is portrayed by actor Marque Richardson. The novelty instrumental "Yakety Sax" by Boots Randolph is based on Curtis's solo in the Coasters' "Yakety Yak".

== Awards ==
In 1970, a year before his death, Curtis won the Best R&B Instrumental Performance Grammy for "Games People Play". He was posthumously inducted into the Rock and Roll Hall of Fame on March 6, 2000.

== Discography ==
=== Albums ===
"Da Duh Dah"
"Da Duh Dah" from the 1960 New Jazz album The New Scene of King Curtis

- Have Tenor Sax, Will Blow (1959) Atco 33-113; CD reissue: Collectables COL-6418
- Azure (1960) Everest LPBR-5121/SDBR-1121; CD reissue: Acrobat ACMCD-4230
- The New Scene of King Curtis (1960) [also released as King Soul! in 1973] New Jazz NJLP-8237; CD reissue: Prestige 24033 – with Nat Adderley
- Soul Meeting (1960) Prestige PRLP-7222; CD reissue: Prestige 24033 – with Nat Adderley
- Soul Battle (1960; rel. 1962) Prestige PRLP-7223; CD reissue: Original Jazz Classics/Fantasy OJC-325 – with Oliver Nelson, Jimmy Forrest
- Arthur Murray's Music for Dancing – The Twist! (Authentic Music by the King Curtis Combo) (1961) RCA Victor LSP-2494
- Trouble in Mind (1961) Tru-Sound TRU-15001; CD reissue: Original Blues Classics/Fantasy OBC-512
- Old Gold (1961) Tru-Sound TRU-15006; CD reissue: Prestige 24153 as Night Train
- It's Party Time with King Curtis (1962) Tru-Sound TRU-15008; CD reissue: Prestige 24153 as Night Train
- Doing the Dixie Twist (1962) Tru-Sound TRU-15009
- Soul Twist with King Curtis & the Noble Knights (1962) Enjoy ENLP-2001; CD reissue: Collectables COL-5119
- The Shirelles and King Curtis Give a Twist Party (1962) [also released as Eternally, Soul in 1968] Scepter SPS-505; CD reissue: Sundazed SC-6013 – with The Shirelles
- Country Soul (1962) Capitol ST-1756
- Soul Serenade (1964) Capitol ST-2095
- Plays the Hits Made Famous by Sam Cooke (1965) Capitol ST-2341
- That Lovin' Feeling (1966) Atco 33-189; CD reissue: Collectables COL-6518
- Live at Small's Paradise (1966) Atco 33-198; CD reissue: Collectables COL-6418
- Plays the Great Memphis Hits (1967) Atco 33-211; CD reissue: Koch KOC-8015
- King Size Soul (1967) Atco 33-231; CD reissue: Koch KOC-8015 – with the Kingpins
- The Best of King Curtis (1967) Capitol ST-2858; CD reissue: Collectables COL-5687 (note: CD reissue includes 7 bonus tracks)
- Sax in Motion (1968) RCA Camden CAS-2242
- Sweet Soul (1968) Atco 33-247; CD reissue: Spy 46006
- The Best of King Curtis (1968) Atco 33-266; LP reissue: Friday Music 33266
- The Best of King Curtis (1969) Prestige PR-7709
- Instant Groove (1969) Atco 33-293; CD reissue: Wounded Bird WOU-6045 – with Duane Allman on 4 tracks [Allman solos on "Foot Pattin'", "Games People Play", "The Weight", "Hey Jude"]
- Get Ready (1970) Atco 33-338; CD reissue: Wounded Bird WOU-6045
- Do Your Thing (1970) Atlantic Special [Netherlands] ("Flash Back" series) 2358 009; CD reissue: Wounded Bird WOU-2358
- Live at Fillmore West (1971) Atco 33-359; CD reissue: Rhino R2-77632 – with the Kingpins
- The Best of King Curtis: One More Time (1972) Prestige PR-7775
- Everybody's Talkin' (1970; rel. 1972) Atco 33-385; CD reissue: Spy 46006
- King Curtis & Champion Jack Dupree – Blues at Montreux (1971; rel. 1973) Atlantic SD-1637; CD reissue: Atlantic 81389 – with Champion Jack Dupree
- Live in New York (1985) JSP 1091; CD reissue: JSP 8812
- King Curtis: 16 Original Hits (Atlantic Soul Classics) (1991) Convoy [Germany] 849 804
- Blow Man, Blow! (1992, 3CD) Bear Family BCD-15670 (compilation of all Capitol material)
- Instant Soul: The Legendary King Curtis (1994) Razor & Tie RE-2054
- King Curtis: The Platinum Collection (2007) Warner Platinum/Rhino 8122-79994-5
- Wail Man Wail! – The Best of King Curtis 1952–1961 (2012, 3CD) Fantastic Voyage FVTD-088
- Sax Scene (2013, 2CD) Not Now Music NOT2CD-510 (reissues/compilation of The New Scene of King Curtis and Soul Meeting)
- The Complete Atco Singles (2015, 3CD) Real Gone Music 0413
- Soul Twistin' with the King! (2017) Jasmine JASCD-940 (this compilation concentrates on his twistin' adventures, comprising the subsequent Soul Twist album, alongside an earlier album, Arthur Murray's Music for Dancing – The Twist! plus 4 tracks from The Shirelles & King Curtis – Give a Twist Party album)

=== Charted singles ===
List of charted singles, showing year released, chart positions and album name
Year	Title	Peak chart position		
Year	Title	US Pop	US R&B	JAM Air.
1962	"Soul Twist" (with the Noble Knights)	17	1	*
1962	"Beach Party" (with the Noble Knights)	60	—	*
1963	"Do the Monkey"	92	—	*
1964	"Soul Serenade"	51	—	6
1965	"Spanish Harlem"	89	—	*
1966	"Something on Your Mind"	—	31	*
1967	"Jump Back"	63	—	*
1967	"Memphis Soul Stew"; King Curtis [& The Kingpins]	33	6	*
1967	"Ode to Billie Joe"; King Curtis [& The Kingpins]	28	6	*
1967	"For What It's Worth"; King Curtis & the Kingpins	87	—	*
1967	"I Was Made to Love Her"; King Curtis & the Kingpins	76	49	*
1968	"(Sittin' On) The Dock of the Bay"; King Curtis & the Kingpins	84	—	*
1968	"Valley of the Dolls"; King Curtis & the Kingpins	83	—	*
1968	"I Heard It Through the Grapevine"; King Curtis & the Kingpins	83	—	*
1968	"Harper Valley PTA"; King Curtis & the Kingpins	93	—	*
1969	"Instant Groove"; King Curtis & the Kingpins	—	35	*
1970	"Get Ready"; King Curtis & the Kingpins	—	46	*
1971	"Whole Lotta Love"; King Curtis & the Kingpins	64	43	*
"—" denotes a recording that did not chart or was not released in that territory. "*" denotes that the chart did not exist at that time.

=== Album appearances ===
==== As sideman ====
With Aretha Franklin

- I Never Loved a Man the Way I Love You (Atlantic, 1967)
- Aretha Arrives (Atlantic, 1967)
- Lady Soul (Atlantic, 1968)
- Soul '69 (Atlantic, 1969)
- Aretha Live at Fillmore West (Atlantic, 1971)

With others

- Ernestine Allen, Let It Roll (Tru-Sound, 1961)
- Brook Benton, Home Style (Cotillion, 1970)
- Ruth Brown, Miss Rhythm (Atlantic, 1959)
- Ray Bryant, MCMLXX (Atlantic, 1970)
- Sam Cooke, Live at the Harlem Square Club, 1963 (RCA, 1985)
- Fats Domino, Fats Is Back (Reprise, 1968)
- Jimmy Forrest, Soul Street (New Jazz, 1964)
- Lionel Hampton, The Many Sides of Hamp (Glad, 1961)
- Eddie Harris, The Electrifying Eddie Harris (Atlantic, 1968)
- Donny Hathaway, Everything Is Everything (Atco, 1970)
- Donny Hathaway, Donny Hathaway (Atco, 1971)
- Buddy Holly, Reminiscing (Coral, 1963)
- Freddie King, Freddie King Is a Blues Master (Cotillion, 1969)
- Freddie King, My Feeling for the Blues (Cotillion, 1970)
- John Lennon, Imagine (Apple, 1971)
- Herbie Mann, Our Mann Flute (Atlantic, 1966)
- Herbie Mann, The Beat Goes On (Atlantic, 1967)
- Arif Mardin, Glass Onion (Atlantic, 1969)
- Carmen McRae, Just a Little Lovin (Atlantic, 1970)
- NRBQ, NRBQ (Columbia, 1970)
- Esther Phillips, Burnin (Atlantic, 1970)
- The Rascals, Once Upon a Dream (Atlantic, 1968)
- The Rascals, Freedom Suite (Atlantic, 1969)
- Shirley Scott, Shirley Scott & the Soul Saxes (Atlantic, 1969)
- Sunnyland Slim, Slim's Shout (Bluesville, 1961)
- Lonnie Smith, Finger Lickin' Good (Columbia, 1967)
- Arbee Stidham, Tired of Wandering (Bluesville, 1961)
- Roosevelt Sykes, The Honeydripper (Bluesville, 1961)
- Alex Taylor, With Friends and Neighbors (Capricorn, 1971)
- Gary Wright, Footprint (A&M, 1971)

== Bibliography ==
- Clifford, Mike: Futrell, John and Bonds, Ray. The Illustrated Encyclopedia of Black music. Harmony Books (1982). Digitized December 29, 2006.
- Hoover, Timothy R. "Soul Serenade: King Curtis and His Immortal Saxophone." University of North Texas Press (2022).
- Kernfield, Barry Dean. New Grove Dictionary of Jazz. Grove's Dictionaries (2002). Digitized December 21, 2006. ISBN 978-1-56159-284-5
- Shaw, Arnold. Honkers and Shouters. Macmillan Publishing Company (1978). ISBN 0-02-061740-2
- Poe, Randy and Gibbons, Billy F. Sky Dog. Backbeat Books (2006). ISBN 978-0-87930-891-9
