= You Don't Love Me (Willie Cobbs song) =

1960 single by Willie Cobbs

Single by Willie Cobbs
- B-side: "You're So Hard to Please"
- Released: 1960
- Recorded: 1960
- Studio: Echo, Memphis, Tennessee
- Genre: Blues
- Length: 2:32
- Label: Mojo
- Producers: Billy Lee Riley, Stan Kessler

"You Don't Love Me" is a rhythm and blues-influenced blues song recorded by American musician Willie Cobbs in 1960. Adapted from Bo Diddley's 1955 song "She's Fine She's Mine", it is Cobbs' best-known song and features a guitar figure and melody that has appealed to musicians in several genres.

Although it became a regional hit when it was released in Memphis, Tennessee, copyright issues prevented its further promotion and national chart success. The song inspired many adaptations, such as "Shimmy Shimmy Walk" by the Megatons and "You Don't Love Me (No, No, No)" by Jamaican singer Dawn Penn. The Allman Brothers Band popularized it with their extended jam concert performances, as captured on At Fillmore East (1971).

== Background ==
Willie Cobbs, an Arkansas native, moved to Chicago in 1947, where he began exploring the burgeoning blues scene centered around Maxwell Street. While in Chicago, he learned the blues harp from Little Walter and began an association with pianist Eddie Boyd. In 1958, Cobbs recorded an unsuccessful single for Ruler Records and auditioned for James Bracken and Vee-Jay Records, who felt that he sounded too similar to their biggest artist, Jimmy Reed.

Cobbs and Boyd eventually returned to Arkansas and began performing in the local clubs. Cobbs claims that he heard a field hand singing "Uh, uh, uh, you don't love me, yes I know" to a haunting melody one morning and that inspired him to write a song. Music journalist Rob Chapman calls "You Don't Love Me" "Willie Cobbs's 1961 adaptation and retitling of Bo Diddley's 1955 'She's Fine, She's Mine'." Bo Diddley recorded for Checker Records, a Chess subsidiary.

Cobbs began performing "You Don't Love Me" to enthusiastic audiences and approached a record label in Memphis, Tennessee, with the hope of recording it. The owner of the Home of the Blues record company turned him down—"He said, 'It's a damn good song but you can't sing'", Cobbs recalled. However, two other producers, Billy Lee Riley and Stan Kessler, overheard the audition and offered to record him.

== Recording and composition ==
Cobbs and Boyd entered the Echo Studio in Memphis to record "You Don't Love Me" for Riley's Mojo Records. Cobbs sang while Boyd accompanied him on piano. According to Cobb and Boyd, Sammy Lawhorn, who later was a member of Muddy Waters' touring band, provided the distinctive guitar figure. A Vee-Jay discography lists Rico Collins on tenor saxophone, Wilbert Harris on drums, and Cobbs on bass. However, Cobbs claims that an unknown bassist performed for the session, after his regular bass player had quit. Instead of the common twelve-bar blues arrangement, the verses are sung on the IV chord, while the instrumentation repeats the riff on the I chords:

Ah ah ah, you don't love me yes I know (2×)
'Cause you left me baby, and I have no place to go

Cobbs' song uses Bo Diddley's guitar riff and melody, as well as many of the lyrics, including the key "you don't love me, you don't love me I know" line. A review in Billboard magazine of the Diddley song noted, "While this is a traditional blues in form, the unusual, almost exotic, arrangement with its hypnotic beat combined with Bo Diddley's anguished vocal takes this far out of the range of the ordinary". Diddley uses a repeated figure on his tremolo-laden guitar and the first verses are sung without lyrics:

Ah ah ah, ah ah ah ah ah ah (2×)
Well you don't love me baby, you don't love me I know

The lyrics "she's fine she's mine" do not appear in the song (Diddley had recorded an unrelated song, "You Don't Love Me (You Don't Care)", with different music and lyrics two months prior on March 2, 1955, which was released on his Go Bo Diddley album). "She's Fine She's Mine" was included as the B-side to his second single, "Diddley Daddy". Although "Diddley Daddy" became a hit, "She's Fine She's Mine" did not appear in the record charts.

== Releases and copyright issue ==
Almost immediately after Mojo Records issued the single, it became a number one hit in Memphis. Hoping to reach a wider audience, Kessler and Riley sold the master recording to Home of the Blues Records, the label that had previously turned Cobbs down. They subsequently issued the single and in an April 3, 1961, review of new records in Billboard, it was listed under "R&B Limited Potentials". Home of the Blues also leased the single to Vee-Jay Records (who had also passed on recording Cobbs), who issued it; a review by Billboard on November 27, 1961, indicated that it had "strong sales potential". (An additional release by Ruler Records has overdubbed organ.)

Trouble ensued when Riley took the songwriting credit for "Shimmy Shimmy Walk, Part 1", an instrumental version of the song recorded by the Megatons, a Louisiana-based group. According to blues historian Gerard Herzhaft, Riley asserts that he was the only guitarist at Cobbs' Mojo session, contrary to Cobbs' and Lawhorn's recollections. Lawsuits were filed, Vee-Jay stopped promoting the single, and it failed to reach the Billboard charts. Cobbs has revisited "You Don't Love Me" several times, including in 1998 for his Pay or Do 11 Months & 29 Days album.

== Adaptations by other artists ==
=== The Megatons ===
In 1961, the Megatons, a Louisiana-based instrumental combo (under the direction of Riley), recorded "Shimmy, Shimmy Walk, Part 1" an instrumental version of "You Don't Love Me". It was released as a two-part single by Dodge Records, based in Feriday, Louisiana. A singles review in Billboard described it as "A rousing medium tempo rocker with a teen dance sound and a rousing r.&b. flavor receives a strong performance from the instrumental group. Side I is the hot side, it swings." The single was later distributed by Checker Records (#1005) and reached number 88 on the Billboard Hot 100. Albert King recorded "Shimmy, Shimmy Walk" for the 1969 Years Gone By album, although some releases list it as "You Don't Love Me (instrumental)".

=== Junior Wells / Buddy Guy / Magic Sam ===
"You Don't Love Me" was a staple of Junior Wells and Buddy Guy's repertoire. In 1965, the duo recorded the song as "You Don't Love Me Baby" for their influential album Hoodoo Man Blues. Their version altered the guitar figure somewhat and added some new lyrics:

You don't love me baby, you don't love me yes I know (2×)
If you leave me baby, don't you know you're gonna hurt me so

Junior Wells later recorded the song for his album Coming at You (1968); Buddy Guy also recorded it for Hold That Plane! (1972). Magic Sam, another Chicago blues player, recorded his version of the song for his second album Black Magic in 1969.

=== Gary Walker ===
Gary Walker of the American trio the Walker Brothers recorded his version of "You Don't Love Me" in 1966. According to Walker, the band's management urged him to record a solo single owing to the success of the Walker Brothers' hits with "Make It Easy on Yourself" and "My Ship Is Comin' In" (both 1965). "You Don't Love Me" was chosen to be recorded as it was a song that Gary Walker had heard the Willie Cobbs original recording prior to emigrating from the United States to the United Kingdom in early 1965. The song was recorded at Philips Studio in London with a backing group named the Vibrations, who featured Billy Bremner on lead fuzz guitar. The recording was produced by Gary Walker's bandmate Scott Walker together with his friend John Stewart under the pseudonym Alec Noel. According to Scott Walker the recording was "just a start. Not even Gary [Walker] would say he's a great singer, but we went into the studios with a simple melody and we just worked at it".

"You Don't Love Me" was released as a single through CBS Records on 11 February 1966 as Gary Walker's debut solo single. It was backed by the B-side "Get It Right", written by Stewart. Owing to the success of the Walker Brothers, who were about to release their single "The Sun Ain't Gonna Shine Anymore" almost simultaneously, "You Don't Love Me" managed to chart, entering the Record Retailer chart on 2 March 1966 before peaking at number 26 on 16 March, staying on the chart for six weeks. It was an even larger hit in Sweden, where it breached the top-ten, reaching number 4 on Kvällstoppen and number 1 on Tio i Topp. The Walker Brothers were on tour when they found out that the single had reached number 1 in Sweden, causing Scott Walker to exclaim "well done, my boy!" to Gary Walker.

=== Al Kooper / Stephen Stills ===
In 1968, Al Kooper with Stephen Stills recorded "You Don't Love Me" for the highly successful Super Session album. Later, Kooper explained in his autobiography: "[The Wells/Guy version] was usually done as a shuffle, but I found it lent itself well to a heavy-metal eighth-note feel. Later, when I mixed the album, I put the two-track mix through a process called 'phasing' that gave it an eerie jet-plane effect." AllMusic critic Lindsay Planer noted in an album review: "Updating the blues standard 'You Don't Love Me' allows Stills to sport some heavily distorted licks, which come off sounding like Jimi Hendrix." (Note: Hendrix's "Bold as Love" (the closing track on his 1967 Axis: Bold as Love album) featured an early use of phasing, sometimes identified as "flanging".)

=== Dawn Penn ===
Jamaican singer Dawn Penn recorded "You Don't Love Me" in 1967. She was introduced to the song by producer Coxsone Dodd, who imported American rhythm and blues records to play for his sound system entertainment businesses. Most of the Bo Diddley/Willie Cobbs melody and lyrics were used, however, her version featured a rocksteady backing arrangement instead of the guitar riff.

No no no, you don't love me and I know now (2×)
'Cause you left me baby, and I got no place to go now

In 1994, she remade it as the dancehall-influenced "You Don't Love Me (No, No, No)", which was an international hit. Penn's rendition inspired versions by Rihanna, who recorded it in 2005 with Vybz Kartel for Music of the Sun, and Beyoncé Knowles for the I Am... World Tour live CD/DVD in 2010 .

=== Allman Brothers Band ===
The Allman Brothers Band included the song on their original lineup setlist. According to Buddy Guy biographer Alan Harper, "Junior's [Wells's 1965 Hoodoo Man album] version of 'You Don't Love Me' had inspired the Allman Brothers to cover the song on their live At Fillmore East [1971] album." Later that year, Duane Allman chose "You Don't Love Me" to create a special tribute to recently slain R&B saxophonist King Curtis, interweaving Curtis' signature "Soul Serenade" into a rendition of the song played at a band show at the Academy of Music in Manhattan on August 15, 1971. A version of the "You Don't Love Me/Soul Serenade" medley was subsequently recorded as part of a in-studio concert held at record label A&R Studios in Manhattan on August 26, 1971, and broadcast live by WPLJ-FM. It was first released on the band's Dreams compilation in 1989, and later on Live from A&R Studios in 2016.

=== John Mayall and the Bluesbreakers ===
The track was recorded by John Mayall & the Bluesbreakers on their 1967 album, A Hard Road. It is one of only two tracks on the original release that featured Peter Green on lead vocals. It followed the Wells/Guy version of the song.

== Recognition and legacy ==
Blues historian Gerard Herzhaft notes that "the riff of 'You Don't Love Me' has inspired quantities of bluesmen". The song has been interpreted and recorded by artists in a variety of styles, with some following the Diddley/Cobbs versions and others following the Wells/Guy versions.

== Bibliography ==
- Billboard (June 11, 1955). "Bo Diddley – record review". Billboard. Vol. 67, no. 24. ISSN 0006-2510.
- Billboard (April 3, 1961a). "Reviews and Ratings of New Records". Billboard. Vol. 73, no. 18. ISSN 0006-2510.
- Billboard (November 27, 1961b). "Reviews of New Singles". Billboard. Vol. 73, no. 47. ISSN 0006-2510.
- Billboard (December 11, 1961c). "Spotlight Singles of the Week – Pop". Billboard. Vol. 78, no. 48. ISSN 0006-2510.
- Billboard (February 24, 1962). "Hot 100". Billboard. Vol. 74, no. 8. ISSN 0006-2510.
- Chapman, Rob (2015). Psychedelia and Other Colours. Faber & Faber. ISBN 978-0571282753.
- Dahl, Bill (1996). "Willie Cobbs". In Erlewine, Michael; Bogdanov, Vladimir; Woodstra, Chris; Koda, Cub (eds.). All Music Guide to the Blues: The Experts' Guide to the Best Blues Recordings. All Music Guide to the Blues. San Francisco: Miller Freeman Books. ISBN 0-87930-424-3.
- Harper, Alan (2016). Waiting for Buddy Guy: Chicago Blues at the Crossroads. Champaign, Illinois: University of Illinois Press. ISBN 978-0252098284.
- Herzhaft, Gerard (1992). "You Don't Love Me". Encyclopedia of the Blues. Fayetteville, Arkansas: University of Arkansas Press. ISBN 1-55728-252-8.
- Herzhaft, Gerard (2003). "You Don't Love Me". La gran enciclopedia del blues. American Bar Association. ISBN 978-84-95601-82-7.
- Jones, Roben (2012). Memphis Boys: The Story of American Studios. University Press of Mississippi. ISBN 978-1-60473-402-7.
- Kooper, Al (2008). Backstage Passes & Backstabbing Bastards. New York City: Backbeat Books. ISBN 978-1617745362.
- Leadbitter, Mike; Slaven, Neil (1987). Blues Records, 1943–1970: A Selective Discography. Record Information Services. ISBN 978-0-907872-07-8.
- "Willie Cobbs bites back". Living Blues. No. 154. November 2000.
- Malvinni, David (2013). Grateful Dead and the Art of Rock Improvisation. Scarecrow Press. ISBN 978-0-8108-8255-3.
- Moskowitz, Stanley (2005). Caribbean Popular Music: An Encyclopedia of Reggae, Mento, Ska, Rock Steady, and Dancehall. Greenwood. ISBN 978-0-313-33158-9.
- O'Neal, Jim; van Singel, Amy (2002). The Voice of the Blues: Classic Interviews from Living Blues Magazine. Routledge. ISBN 978-0-415-93654-5.
- Titon, Jeff Todd (2008). Worlds of Music: An Introduction to the Music of the World's Peoples. Cengage Learning. ISBN 978-0-534-59539-5.
- Whitburn, Joel (1988). Top R&B Singles 1942–1988. Menomonee Falls, Wisconsin: Record Research. ISBN 0-89820-068-7.
