= Hour Glass (band) =

American soul band 1967-1968

- Origin: Los Angeles, California, United States
- Genres: Soul
- Years active: 1967–1968
- Labels: Liberty
- Past members: Gregg Allman; Duane Allman; Pete Carr; Paul Hornsby; Johnny Sandlin; Mabron McKinney; Bob Keller

Hour Glass was an American soul band based in Los Angeles, California in 1967 and 1968. Among their members were two future members of the Allman Brothers Band (Duane Allman and his brother Gregg) and three future studio musicians at the FAME Studios in Muscle Shoals, Alabama (Pete Carr, Johnny Sandlin and Paul Hornsby).

== History ==
Formed by members of two disbanded rival groups that had played the same southern circuit, The Allman Joys (based in Florida) and the Men-its (based in Alabama), the group was booked in early 1967 into a month-long engagement in St. Louis, Missouri, where they met members of the Nitty Gritty Dirt Band, whose manager, Bill McEuen, arranged for them a contract with Liberty Records.

Moving to Los Angeles, they were soon opening for groups like The Doors and Buffalo Springfield and recording their eponymous debut album, full of lighthearted poppy soul that was unlike what the group was performing in clubs and theatres in California such as The Fillmore Ballrooom and Troubadour. These songs were chosen from a pool of staff writers, including Jackson Browne and Jimmy Radcliffe, whose song "Nothing But Tears" was the A-side of the Hour Glass' debut single. The ensuing album flopped, perhaps in part because the material did not really reflect the group's tastes or strengths. In fact, the Hour Glass generally refused to perform these songs in their live shows, focusing instead on their gritty, blues- and R&B-inflected southern sounds, along with a couple of originals by Gregg Allman.

The group members were unhappy at not being able to perform as often as they had been accustomed due to the label's concern with overexposure. Losing bassist Mabron McKinney and his successor Bob Keller, they soldiered on, performing concerts and recording a second album, Power of Love, which featured bassist Pete Carr from Daytona Beach. However, Power of Love, which also featured the songwriting skills of Gregg Allman and material that fit the group much better than the material on their debut, nonetheless flopped.

In a last-ditch effort, the members left Los Angeles to work at the FAME Studios in Muscle Shoals, Alabama, where they recorded a handful of tracks that showed their full potential in the studio. After these tracks were rejected by Liberty, the group returned to the Southeast, did a few more gigs, and called it quits.

Duane and Gregg Allman went to Jacksonville, Florida, where they jammed with folk-rockers The 31st of February, featuring drummer Butch Trucks. The others went back to Alabama and did some session work in Muscle Shoals.

After the 31st of February demos were rejected by that group's label, Gregg Allman decided to return to Los Angeles to pick up the pieces of the Hour Glass' deal with Liberty. He recorded several tracks in Los Angeles with studio musicians. A single, a remake of Tammy Wynette's country hit "D.I.V.O.R.C.E.," was released on Liberty under the name "Gregg Allman and the Hour Glass." However, it too failed to chart, and the remaining tracks for a planned album were scuttled and only issued twenty-five years later as bonus tracks on reissues of the Hour Glass's Liberty recordings.

Duane Allman re-joined his former Hour Glass bandmates in Muscle Shoals, where he met drummer J. Johanny "Jaimoe" Johanson. Interested in recruiting bassist Berry Oakley of Jacksonville psychedelic blues band the Second Coming, whom he had met the previous July at an Hour Glass performance at Jacksonville's Comic Book Club, Allman and Johanson left Muscle Shoals for Florida, where Allman began sitting in with Oakley's band. Impressed with Second Coming guitarist Dickey Betts' playing, Allman decided to add him to his fledgling line-up as well. With the addition of a second drummer, former 31 February drummer Butch Trucks, and brother Gregg on vocals and organ, who would at this point abandon his solo career in Los Angeles, the new line-up became the Allman Brothers Band.

== Personnel ==
- Duane Allman - guitars, electric sitar, vocal
- Gregg Allman - vocal, organ, piano, guitar
- Paul Hornsby - piano, organ, guitar, vocal
- Johnny Sandlin - drums, guitar, gong
- Mabron McKinney - bass (1967)
- Bob Keller - bass (1967)
- Pete Carr - bass, guitar, vocal (1967–1968)

== Discography ==
=== Albums ===
- Hour Glass (Liberty, 1967)
- Power of Love (Liberty, 1968)
- The Hour Glass (compilation of the two studio albums) (United Artists, 1973)
- Southbound (The Rare Liberty Recordings) (compilation) (Acadia, 2004)

=== Singles ===
October 1967: "Nothing But Tears" / "Heartbeat"
- from Hour Glass (1967)
March 1968: "Power of Love" / "I Still Want Your Love"
- from Power of Love (1968)
June 1968: "D-I-V-O-R-C-E" / "Changing of the Guard" (as Gregg Allman and the Hour Glass)
- Side "A" new recording by Gregg Allman and session musicians, Side "B" from Power of Love (1968)
September 1968: "She Is My Woman" / "Going Nowhere" (as Gregg Allman and the Hour Glass)
- Side "A" new recording by Gregg Allman and session musicians, Side "B" from Power of Love (1968)
October 1968: "Now Is the Time" / "She Is My Woman" (as Gregg Allman and the Hour Glass)
- Side "A" from Power of Love (1968), Side "B" previously released on 45 in September 1968
January 1969: "I've Been Trying" / "Silently" (as Gregg Allman and the Hour Glass)
- from Hour Glass (1967)

== See also ==
- Muscle Shoals Rhythm Section
