= Willie Cobbs =

American blues musician, singer, and songwriter (1932–2021)

- Cobbs c. 1980s

Background information
- Born: July 15, 1932; Smale, Arkansas, U.S.
- Died: October 25, 2021 (aged 89) North Little Rock, Arkansas, U.S.
- Genres: Blues
- Occupations: Musician; songwriter
- Instruments: Harmonica; vocals
- Years active: 1950s–2021

Willie C. Cobbs (July 15, 1932 – October 25, 2021) was an American blues singer, harmonica player and songwriter. He is best known for his song "You Don't Love Me".

== Life and career ==
Born in Smale, Monroe County, Arkansas, United States, Cobbs moved to Chicago in 1951, where he occasionally performed in local clubs with Little Walter, Eddie Boyd, and others. He served in the National Guard in the early 1950s and then returned to Chicago, recording several singles on such labels as Ruler, a subsidiary of J.O.B. Records.

He first recorded his composition "You Don't Love Me" in 1960 for Mojo Records, a record label in Memphis, Tennessee, owned by Billy Lee Riley. The recording was leased to Vee-Jay Records for release. The song was similar to Bo Diddley's 1955 song "She's Fine, She's Mine" and came close to entering the charts until Vee-Jay slowed its promotion when questions were raised about its authorship. Cover versions have been recorded by various artists, including John Mayall & the Bluesbreakers; James & Bobby Purify; Al Kooper and Stephen Stills; Booker T. & the M.G.'s; Junior Wells; Ike & Tina Turner; Albert King; Sonny & Cher; Jimmy Dawkins; Luther Allison; Dr. Feelgood; Gary Moore; the Allman Brothers Band; John P. Hammond; and R.L. Burnside. Another interpretation was the rocksteady rendition by Dawn Penn, entitled "You Don't Love Me (No, No, No)", first recorded in 1967, but a global hit when re-recorded in 1994.

Cobbs continued to record regularly and later released singles for various labels. In direct response to James Brown's message of "Say It Loud – I'm Black and I'm Proud" (1968), Cobbs wryly observed that Brown was a millionaire by that point, as Cobbs' retort was "Sing It Low – I'm Black and I'm Poor".

He returned to Arkansas in the 1970s and continued to perform and record for local labels, as well as running several nightclubs in Arkansas and Mississippi through the 1970s and 1980s. He went on to release the album Hey Little Girl for the Wilco label in 1986. He performed at the King Biscuit Blues Festival and the Chicago Blues Festival, and appeared in the 1991 film Mississippi Masala performing the songs "Angel from Heaven" and "Sad Feelin'". After that, he made several more appearances in movies and television shows, including the 1992 TV movie Memphis with Cybill Shepherd.

In 1994 he signed with the Rooster Blues label, which released his album Down to Earth. In 1999, he released the album Pay or Do 11 Months and 29 Days on his label, followed the next year by Jukin', produced by Willie Mitchell and featuring the Hi Rhythm Section. His last recordings were issued in 2019 on the album Butler Boy Blues, produced by Michael Babb at Babbylon Sound in Memphis.

Cobbs died in North Little Rock, Arkansas, on October 25, 2021, aged 89.
