= Johnny Jenkins =

American blues guitarist (1939–2006)

- Born: March 5, 1939; Bibb County, Georgia, U.S.
- Died: June 26, 2006 (aged 67) Bibb County, Georgia, U.S.
- Genre: Blues
- Occupation: Musician
- Instrument: Guitar
- Years active: 1962–1970; 1996–2006

Johnny Edward Jenkins (March 5, 1939 – June 26, 2006) was an American left-handed blues guitarist, who helped launch the career of Otis Redding. His flamboyant style of guitar playing also influenced Jimi Hendrix.

== Biography ==
In the 1960s, Jenkins was the leader of the Pinetoppers, who employed a young Otis Redding as singer. As Jenkins did not have a driver's license, Redding also served as his personal driver. During a recording session in 1962 organized by the band's manager, Phil Walden, Jenkins left forty minutes of studio time unused. Redding used this time to record a ballad, "These Arms of Mine", on which Jenkins played guitar. Scott Freeman, in his biography of Redding, Otis!: The Otis Redding Story, gives several accounts of that chaotic day at Stax Records. In 1964, Jenkins released an instrumental single, "Spunky" (Volt V-122).

With Phil Walden concentrating on Redding's flourishing career, Jenkins was sidelined, and it was not until after Redding's death in 1967 that Walden again concentrated on Jenkins's career. In 1970, Jenkins released the album Ton-Ton Macoute!. The opening track, a cover of Dr. John's "I Walk on Guilded Splinters", has been sampled by numerous musicians, including Beck (Loser), and Oasis (Go Let It Out). Several tracks on Ton-Ton Macoute! featured Duane Allman on guitar and dobro.

With Walden again becoming involved in other projects, Jenkins became disillusioned with the music industry and did nothing of note until 1996. By then Walden had persuaded him to make a comeback, and he released the album Blessed Blues, recorded with Chuck Leavell. Two further albums followed: Handle with Care and All in Good Time.

Jenkins died from a stroke in June 2006 in the same town where he was born: Macon, Georgia. He was 67. His brother, Terry Lee Jenkins, borrowed Otis Redding's Cadillac to use for his prom.

Jenkins was inducted into the Georgia Music Hall of Fame in 2012.

== Discography ==
Solo

- Ton-Ton Macoute! (1970)
- Blessed Blues (1996)
- Handle With Care (2001)
- All in Good Time (2005)

With Otis Redding

- Pain in My Heart (Atco Records, 1964)
- The Great Otis Redding Sings Soul Ballads (Atco Records, 1965)
