= Betts, Hall, Leavell and Trucks =

American rock band

- Genres: Southern rock
- Years active: 1982–1984
- Past members: Dickey Betts; Jimmy Hall; Chuck Leavell; Butch Trucks; David "Rook" Goldflies; Danny Parks

Betts, Hall, Leavell and Trucks, often referred to as BHLT, was an American musical group that existed from 1982 to 1984 and that featured former members of The Allman Brothers Band and Wet Willie. Despite a positive reception for their live performances, the group never got a recording contract.

== Origins ==
The Allman Brothers Band, founded in 1969, had survived the death of its leader, Duane Allman, to hit a commercial peak with Capricorn Records in the mid-1970s; but neither surviving brother Gregg Allman nor increasingly prominent guitarist Dickey Betts had the same leadership qualities, and the group dissolved in acrimony in 1976. They had reunited again in 1979, with a somewhat different line-up; but by the late 1970s and early 1980s, Southern rock as a genre was out of fashion, with first disco and then other forms of popular music becoming ascendent. Capricorn had gone bankrupt, and the Allman Brothers Band was by then under contract to Arista Records; the label and its head, Clive Davis, had been intent on getting the group to play in a more modern style which would produce hit singles. The resulting music had both displeased the group and failed to produce any substantial hits, and the group broke up again during early 1982.

Wet Willie was another Capricorn Records group lumped under the Southern rock umbrella, but more soul- and R&B-flavored than most other artists in that genre. They also had more of a bar band approach and feel. Wet Willie had had a hit single in 1974 with "Keep On Smilin'" but otherwise failed to find consistent commercial success; a switch to Epic Records in the late 1970s failed to change that situation and by 1980 they had disbanded. Subsequently their lead singer Jimmy Hall embarked on a solo career with Epic, releasing an album in 1980 and another, Cadillac Tracks, in 1982.

John Scher was a concert promoter in the northeastern United States who had managed the Allman Brothers during the 1981–82 period. Together with his assistant Bert Holman, he managed a new project, one that was being pulled together by Betts.

The two front men of the new group were Allmans guitarist and vocalist Betts and Wet Willie lead vocalist, saxophonist, and harmonica player Hall. The other two prominent members were Chuck Leavell, who had joined the Allman Brothers in 1972 and whose piano playing was a key in the group's mid-1970s commercial success, and Butch Trucks, a founding member of the Allman Brothers and one of that group's two drummers. There had been previous discussions about bringing Leavell back into the Allman Brothers Band, but due to business issues Gregg Allman was intent on not working with Leavell again. However, Leavell, who had just come off performing with The Rolling Stones on their European Tour 1982, had reconciled with Betts and other members of the Allmans. Rounding out the group were bassist David "Rook" Goldflies, who had been in the Allman Brothers' 1979–82 reunited lineup, and violinist Danny Parks. The little-known Parks was a young guitar and fiddle player from Wisconsin who was beginning to make a name for himself in the Upper Midwest when Betts and Trucks happened to notice him while in Chicago. Desiring a violin player, Betts recruited him to play in the new group, although he would play some guitar in it as well.

== On the road ==
The name Betts, Hall, Leavell and Trucks was adopted, either because they could not think of something different or because of legal complications in choosing anything else. Some early press reports described them as a band without a name. The group's rehearsal space was in Sarasota, Florida, in warehouses that belonged to the Allman Brothers organization.

The group's first concert was held in Fort Worth, Texas on December 2, 1982. Once on the road, they played in venues such as the Agora Ballroom in Atlanta and the Wax Museum nightclub in Washington, D.C. Other early club appearances included at the Brandywine in Chadds Ford, Pennsylvania, and The Bottom Line in New York City. The group appeared at Volunteer Jam IX in Nashville in January 1983.

In some cases Betts, Hall, Leavell and Trucks was an opening act, such as for The Marshall Tucker Band in March 1983 at Concord College in West Virginia, and in May 1983, when they played the Capitol Theatre in Passaic, New Jersey, opening for Johnny Winter. Several times, the group's activity had to halt due to Leavell's absence to go to Paris to play keyboards on sessions for The Rolling Stones for their Undercover album. (Leavell would go on to play with the Stones for decades to come, serving as their de facto musical director during tours.)

The name was something of an open question. Hall conceded that in the long form, what they were using sounded like the name of a law firm, and in the acronym form, sounded like the popular lunch item. Indeed, within the group, members jokingly referred to themselves as the "Sandwich Band". A writer for a Macon, Georgia newspaper said that they were "probably ... the hottest band in the nation without a name." In October 1983, a year after the group's beginning, a writer for The Tennessean was referring to it as a "still-unnamed ... aggregation". There was some feeling within the group that they would settle on a name once they got a recording contract.

The music of Betts, Hall, Leavell and Trucks was varied. During the times that the Allman Brothers had been inactive or broken up, Betts had explored several different genres, including country, Western swing, and blues. BHLT explored all of these too, as well as R&B and rock and Southern boogie. The instrumental focus tended to be on the front-line players on guitar, saxophone, and violin; Leavell played piano solos but his main role was to tie into the rhythm section while anchoring the harmonic progressions underneath the other soloists.

The group's concert appearances featured some new material, including the shared-vocals song "Whole Lot Of Memories", the Betts-led "Pick a Little Boogie", and the Hall-led songs "Need Somebody Bad" and "Stop Knockin' On My Door". There were also some prior Betts solo songs, such as "Nothing You Can Do" from Dickey Betts & Great Southern (1977) and "Rain" from Highway Call (1974), the latter of which was rearranged and sung by Leavell. Hall led an extended performance of "Cadillac Tracks", the title song from his just-out solo album, and also sang the lead on "One Track Mind" from Wet Willie's Manorisms album (1977).

Finally there were renditions of three well-known Betts-written numbers from the Allman Brothers' high-selling 1973 Brothers and Sisters album: "Ramblin' Man", "Jessica", and "Southbound". But overall, both the set list and the feel of the music stayed away from the Allmans sound; from the stage, Hall described what they were playing as "barbecue music".

A review of a January 1983 show in The Washington Post said of the new outfit, "They stripped away all the nonsense and excess of recent Southern-rock and returned to the rhythm & blues and country roots that once made this regional music so exciting." There was a feeling within some in the music world that Southern rock had never gotten over the dissolution of the Allman Brothers and the loss of Lynyrd Skynyrd; a profile of Hall in The Tennessean suggested that BHLT, based on its appearance at the Volunteer Jam, had the ability to fill that void. However, Hall claimed no such goal, saying of the group's music, "It's beyond the same old southern-rock. It's a mixture of street rock & roll with rockabilly touches now."

== In search of a record deal ==
Manager Scher was enthusiastic about the group's prospects, later saying "that was a really good band," and at least one reviewer predicted they would soon be attached to a label. Towards this end they recorded some demos. By August 1983 about half a dozen such demos had been made, a number that would eventually grow to around a dozen.

The song in the demos that would become the best known was "No One to Run With", which had been written by Betts along with John Prestia. It was rediscovered twelve years later, once the Allman Brothers had reformed for good, and was recorded for their 1994 album Where It All Begins. With its elegiac feel paired to a Bo Diddley beat, it was the single released from the album, and became a centerpiece of Allmans concerts in the years to follow.

At the time the demos were being made, Leavell said there were several companies interested. However, Betts and Trucks were still signed to Arista Records, under the control of Clive Davis, and Davis was not interested in BHLT making an album.

During July 1984, BHLT was once again an opening act for the Marshall Tucker Band, playing outdoor venues such as the Merriweather Post Pavilion in Maryland, Pier 84 in New York City, and Riverbend Music Center in Cincinnati.

== End and legacy ==
But the year 1984 would be the last for BHLT. Without a record contract, members of the group needed to look toward alternatives for their future. As a result, the group split up.

Because Betts, Hall, Leavell and Trucks never recorded an album, it has often been forgotten in the annals of Southern rock. But members of the group have subsequently held it in high regard. Betts would later recall: "Remember that group BHLT? It sounded like a deli sandwich but it was a pretty good band. But it died; nobody would even let us record an album." Hall has stated, "We toured the country playing all the best venues ... but I think our direction was too varied for some people's tastes." Leavell has written, "We had a strong band, and it cooked. In fact, I've always said in the years since that BHLT was the best band you've never heard of."

Writer Dean Budnick has called BHLT an "intriguing project" that "never quite caught on". Other critics have suggested that the group was playing the right music, but at the wrong time for it.

With no album to document the group's existence, only a few tapes of live performances existed to document the group's existence. One from the New York area circulated as a bootleg for a while. However, in 2016 Betts, Hall, Leavell and Trucks – Live at The Coffee Pot 1983 was released by MVD Entertainment Group, capturing a performance at a club in Roanoke, Virginia. The show had been broadcast live on television at the time, by USA Network, and took some years to come to light.
