= Bless Your Heart (album) =

Studio album by The Allman Betts Band
- Released: August 28, 2020
- Studio: Muscle Shoals (Sheffield, Alabama)
- Genre: Southern rock
- Label: BMG
- Producer: Matt Ross-Spang

The Allman Betts Band chronology
Down to the River (2019)	Bless Your Heart (2020)

Bless Your Heart is an album by the country rock group the Allman Betts Band. Their second album, it was recorded on two-inch analog tape at Muscle Shoals Sound Studio in Sheffield, Alabama. It was released as a CD and as a two-disc LP on August 28, 2020.

The Allman Betts Band includes the sons of three founding members of the Allman Brothers Band – Devon Allman (son of Gregg Allman), Duane Betts (son of Dickey Betts), and Berry Duane Oakley (son of Berry Oakley).

== Critical reception ==
In the Sarasota Herald-Tribune Wade Tatangelo wrote, "Music lovers seeking a fresh fix of genuine rock and roll will be hard-pressed to find a more satisfying release in 2020 than the Allman Betts Band's double album Bless Your Heart.... It places you in the room with a group of gifted musicians who are making music meant to be heard in front of an audience. The Allman Betts Band has already built a reputation as one of the best live acts of their generation..."

In No Depression Grant Britt wrote, "The sophomore offering from the Allman Betts Band encapsulates and embraces the Allman legacy without slavishly copying the sound of their parent company.... This is the Allman Betts Band's best offering yet, showcasing a band still tethered to their legacy but their own way with a sound that honors their roots without stepping all over them."

On AllMusic Timothy Monger said, "... Bless Your Heart is a reliable and often-pleasing romp down the muggy dirt roads of soulful Southern rock that hits its mark squarely without making any real attempts to rock the boat. Given the group's M.O., that's not necessarily a bad thing. Allman, Betts, and bassist Berry Duane Oakley... are all fluid, capable musicians with deep knowledge, personal history, and an inherent chemistry well-suited to this type of music."

In Rock and Blues Muse Mike O'Cull said, "The Allman Betts Band delivers the tie-dyed summertime goods on its brand-new album Bless Your Heart.... It's a road-forged album full of the chemistry of legends and the kind of telepathic musical interplay nine bands out of ten will never reach.... The Allman Betts Band is one of the finest blues/rock outfits in the world right now and it feels like they're just getting started."

In Glide Magazine Doug Collette wrote, "Bless Your Heart simultaneously reinforces and extends the favorable first impression left with the premier album.... Allman, Betts and Stachela not only have distinct styles, but also some bonafide chemistry. It's also crucial to note their sharp, shared instincts for jamming also extend to the keyboardist, not to mention percussionist R. Scott Bryan and drummer John Lum."

In Louder Hugh Fielder said, "Considering that their fathers had to be separated into different bands, the sons of Gregg Allman and Dickey Betts seem to be getting along just fine. Guitarists Devon Allman and Duane Betts are joined by a third son-of-an-Allman Brother, Berry Duane Oakley, on bass in their seven-piece band, along with a third guitarist because, well, you can never have enough guitarists when it comes to southern rock."

In Blues Rock Review Pete Francis said, "On Bless Your Heart, the Allman Betts Band continues to do what they do best, deliver good ole' fashioned blues-tinged southern rock. The 13 tracks take the listener on a ride and are filled with an abundance of textures."

== Track listing ==
1. "Pale Horse Rider" (Devon Allman, Duane Betts) – 4:43
2. "Carolina Song" (Allman, Betts, Stoll Vaughan) – 5:46
3. "King Crawler" (Allman, Betts, Vaughan) – 4:04
4. "Ashes of My Lovers" (Betts, Vaughan) – 4:10
5. "Savannah's Dream" (Betts) – 12:03
6. "Airboats & Cocaine" (Allman, Betts, Vaughan) – 4:20
7. "Southern Rain" (Allman, Vaughan) – 6:39
8. "Rivers Run" (Betts, Vaughan) – 3:57
9. "Magnolia Road" (Vaughan) – 5:17
10. "Should We Ever Part" (Allman, Betts, Vaughan) – 5:07
11. "The Doctor's Daughter" (Berry Duane Oakley, Allman, Betts, Vaughan) – 8:18
12. "Much Obliged" (Allman, Betts) – 3:37
13. "Congratulations" (Cisco Adler) – 3:14

== Personnel ==
The Allman Betts Band

- Devon Allman – vocals, electric and acoustic guitar, bass
- Duane Betts – vocals, electric and acoustic guitar
- Berry Duane Oakley – bass, vocals, piano
- Johnny Stachela – slide guitar, electric guitar
- R. Scott Bryan – percussion, drums
- John Lum – drums
- John Ginty – keyboards

Additional musicians

- Art Edmaiston – saxophone
- Jimmy Hall – harmonica
- Shannon McNally – cameo vocal appearance
- Reba Russell – background vocals
- Susan Marshall – background vocals

Production

- Produced by Matt Ross-Spang
- Co-producers: Devon Allman, Duane Betts
- Engineering, mixing: Matt Ross-Spang
- Assistant engineers: Chase Brandon, Daniel Lynn, Chris Turnbaugh
- Mastering: Pete Lyman
- Art direction, design: Charley Robinson
- Photography: Darin Black, Gilbert Lee
