= Volunteer Jam =

American music festival series

Volunteer Jam 1 – 1974

The Volunteer Jam is a sporadically held concert series headlined by the Charlie Daniels Band, featuring a multitude of musical acts that perform onstage with the band. It was first held on October 4, 1974, at the War Memorial Auditorium in Nashville, Tennessee.

Over the years, guests have included Ted Nugent, The Allman Brothers Band, The Marshall Tucker Band, Billy Joel, Garth Brooks, Billy Ray Cyrus, Stevie Ray Vaughan, Tammy Wynette, Roy Acuff, Carl Perkins, Alabama, Don Henley, Barefoot Jerry and many more. Many of those concerts were broadcast live on the radio. The Volunteer Jam on nationwide television included a live broadcast on the Jerry Lewis Labor Day Telethon and a Dick Clark–produced network special. "Volunteer Jam" is also the name of a series of albums released by Charlie Daniels of performances from the late 1970s and early 1980s at the Volunteer Jam shows. Later Volunteer Jams became benefits for Daniels' charity, the Journey Home Project, for soldiers.

== History ==
=== Volunteer Jam I ===
October 4, 1974

External image
- Photo by Dave Ernsberger via The Tennessean
- Volunteer Jam I at War Memorial Auditorium in Nashville, Tennessee

The first Volunteer Jam concert was held at War Memorial Auditorium in Nashville. The show was scheduled as a live recording session for two songs for the Fire on the Mountain album, "No Place to Go" and "Orange Blossom Special." The CDB invited some of their friends—Dickey Betts from the Allman Brothers Band and Toy Caldwell, Jerry Eubanks and Paul Riddle from the Marshall Tucker Band—to get together and jam after their set. A tradition was born.

=== Volunteer Jam II ===
September 12, 1975
Officially known as "Volunteer Jam '75," the second Jam was held at the Murphy Center in Murfreesboro, Tennessee. Special guests included The Marshall Tucker Band, Dickey Betts and Chuck Leavell from the Allman Brothers Band, Jimmy Hall from Wet Willie and Dru Lombar from Grinderswitch. The concert was filmed and released as Volunteer Jam - Starring The Charlie Daniels Band, the first full-length Southern rock motion picture.

=== Volunteer Jam III ===
January 8, 1977
Volunteer Jam III was held at Municipal Auditorium in Nashville. Special guests included The Winters Brothers Band, Grinderswitch, Wet Willie, Sea Level, The Sanford-Townsend Band and others. Performances from this Jam were combined with performances from VolJam IV to create a live album, Volunteer Jam III and IV. Attendance was estimated to be 12,000 concert-goers.

=== Volunteer Jam IV ===
January 14, 1978
Volunteer Jam IV was held again at Municipal Auditorium in Nashville. Special guests included The Winters Brothers Band, Grinderswitch, Wet Willie, Sea Level, The Sanford-Townsend Band and others. Performances from this Jam were combined with performances from VolJam III to create a live album, Volunteer Jam III and IV. Attendance was estimated to be 10,000 plus people. Proceeds from the concert went to the surviving families of the Lynyrd Skynyrd plane crash victims.

=== Volunteer Jam V ===
January 13, 1979
Volunteer Jam V was held again at Municipal Auditorium in Nashville. This Jam marked the return of Lynyrd Skynyrd to the stage for the first time since the 1977 plane crash that claimed several band members, and the CDB gave the first live performance of a song that would catapult the band to superstardom later that year, "The Devil Went Down to Georgia." Special guests also included Toy Caldwell and George McCorkle from the Marshall Tucker Band, Dobie Gray, The Winters Brothers Band, The Henry Paul Band, Link Wray, and John Prine.

=== Volunteer Jam VI ===
January 12, 1980
Volunteer Jam VI was held again at Municipal Auditorium in Nashville. Special guests included The Winters Brothers Band, Dobie Gray, Grinderswitch, Papa John Creach, The Henry Paul Band, Rufus Thomas, Crystal Gayle, Wet Willie, Bobby Jones & New Life, Louisiana's LeRoux, Ted Nugent and others. Tickets were by mail order only and cost $10 each.

=== Volunteer Jam VII ===
January 17, 1981
Volunteer Jam VII was held again at Municipal Auditorium in Nashville. The CDB's special guests included Ted Nugent, Dobie Gray, Molly Hatchet, Delbert McClinton, Crystal Gayle, Bobby Bare, Jimmy Hall from Wet Willie and others.

=== Volunteer Jam VIII ===
January 30, 1982
Volunteer Jam VIII was held again at Municipal Auditorium in Nashville. Special guests included Johnny Lee, George Thorogood, Crystal Gayle, Quarterflash, The Oak Ridge Boys, Dickey Betts, Jimmy C. Newman, Duane Eddy, Roy Acuff and others. Proceeds from the concert went to leukemia research and a Vietnam veterans group.

=== Volunteer Jam IX ===
January 22, 1983
Volunteer Jam IX was held again at Municipal Auditorium in Nashville. The CDB's special guests included James Brown, Carl Perkins, Betts, Hall, Leavell and Trucks, Grinderswitch, Quarterflash, Johnny Lee, The Winters Brothers Band, Papa John Creach, Woody Herman, Streets, and others.

=== Volunteer Jam X ===
February 4, 1984
Volunteer Jam X was held again at Municipal Auditorium in Nashville. Special guests included The Nitty Gritty Dirt Band, Ronnie Milsap, Dobie Gray, Stevie Ray Vaughan, Vince Gill, Louise Mandrell, Amy Grant, The Bellamy Brothers, Emmylou Harris, Rodney Crowell, Crystal Gayle, Streets, Exile, B.J. Thomas, Tammy Wynette and others.

=== Volunteer Jam XI ===
February 2, 1985
Volunteer Jam XI was held again at Municipal Auditorium in Nashville. Special guests included Kris Kristofferson, Tom Wopat, Little Richard, Nicolette Larson, Alabama, Ted Nugent, Bill Medley from The Righteous Brothers, Tommy Shaw from Styx, Lacy J. Dalton, Gail Davies, Eddy Raven, Emmylou Harris, Amy Grant, and others. This year marked the first time the concert was broadcast live on cable television to 50 cities. In addition, it was broadcast live on Voice of America to 100 million listeners.

=== Volunteer Jam XII ===
July 12, 1986
Volunteer Jam XII was held at the then-new Starwood Amphitheatre in Nashville. Special guests included John Conlee, Dobie Gray, The Judds, Restless Heart, Marty Stuart, The Outlaws, John Schneider, The Allman Brothers Band, Dwight Yoakam and others.

=== Volunteer Jam XIII ===
September 6, 1987
Volunteer Jam XIII was held again at Starwood Amphitheatre in Nashville. Special guests included William Lee Golden, Stevie Ray Vaughan, Gary Chapman, Great White and others including Lynyrd Skynyrd. It was Johnny Van Zant's first appearance as Skynyrd frontman, replacing his brother, Ronnie, who died in a 1977 plane crash. The Jam also coincided with the Jerry Lewis Labor Day Telethon, and some of the Jam performances were broadcast on the program.

=== Volunteer Jam XIV ===
May 4, 1991
Volunteer Jam XIV was held again at Starwood Amphitheatre in Nashville. Special guests included Tanya Tucker, Bobby Jones & New Life, Travis Tritt, Joe Diffie, Ted Nugent, Jim "Dandy" Mangrum, B.B. King and John Kay & Steppenwolf. The concert, which was held outside, started out with a steady downpour of rain, but by the time Tanya Tucker took the stage in the afternoon, the sun had come out.

=== Volunteer Jam XV ===
September 20, 1992
Volunteer Jam XV was held again at Starwood Amphitheatre in Nashville. Special guests included Poco, Eddie Rabbitt, Little Feat, The Oak Ridge Boys, Paulette Carlson, Suzy Bogguss, Jo-El Sonnier, Pirates Of The Mississippi, Confederate Railroad, Hal Ketchum, The Desert Rose Band, and others. This year marked when Daniels left Epic Records and moved to the Liberty label.

=== Volunteer Jam XVI ===
October 29, 1996
The last of the original Jams, Volunteer Jam XVI, was held at the Tennessee Performing Arts Center in Nashville. The Jam was reimagined as an acoustic show and commemorated Daniels' 60th birthday. Special guests included Lorrie Morgan, David Ball, Billy Ray Cyrus, Tracy Byrd, Tracy Lawrence, John Berry, Randy Scruggs and BlackHawk.

=== Volunteer Jam XVII (Volunteer Jam Colorado) ===
May 24, 2014
An unofficial Volunteer Jam concert was held at Fiddler's Green Amphitheatre outside Denver, honoring members of the military, the Red Cross and first responders. Also appearing with the CDB were Craig Campbell, BlackHawk and The Outlaws. Daniels was interviewed by Dan Rather prior to the show, which was then broadcast live on AXS TV after the interview.

=== Volunteer Jam XVIII (40th Anniversary Volunteer Jam) ===
August 12, 2015
The CDB celebrated the 40th anniversary of the Volunteer Jam with an all-star lineup at Bridgestone Arena in Nashville. Artists scheduled to perform included Travis Tritt, Montgomery Gentry, Billy Ray Cyrus, The Kentucky Headhunters, The Outlaws, Lee Roy Parnell, Trace Adkins, Colt Ford, Tracy Lawrence, Craig Morgan, Ted Nugent, The Oak Ridge Boys and Michael W. Smith.

=== Volunteer Jam XIX (Charlie Daniels 80th Birthday Volunteer Jam) ===
November 30, 2016
Daniels celebrated his 80th birthday with a Volunteer Jam on November 30, 2016, with special guests Chris Stapleton, Travis Tritt, Kid Rock, Larry The Cable Guy, 3 Doors Down and Luke Bryan.

=== Volunteer Jam XX: A Tribute to Charlie ===
March 7, 2018
"Volunteer Jam XX: A Tribute to Charlie" included the CDB, Alison Krauss, Billy Gibbons of ZZ Top, Blackberry Smoke, Bobby Bare, Chris Janson, Chuck Leavell, Eddie Montgomery of Montgomery Gentry, Jamey Johnson, Justin Moore, The Oak Ridge Boys, Ricky Skaggs, Alabama, Sara Evans, Lee Brice, Chris Young and Travis Tritt. It was recorded for broadcast on AXS TV, as well as DVD/CD releases.

=== Volunteer Jam XXI: A Musical Salute to Charlie Daniels ===
August 18, 2021
"Volunteer Jam XXI: A Musical Salute to Charlie Daniels." Organised by David Corlew (Daniels' business manager), the first event after his July 6, 2020 death is a benefit for Daniels' charity The Journey Home Project. The event featured the surviving members of the CDB in addition to Alabama, The Marshall Tucker Band, Ricky Skaggs, The Gatlin Brothers, Chris Young, Randy Travis, Travis Tritt, Lorrie Morgan, Exile, Michael W. Smith, Big & Rich, Anthony Castagna, CeCe Winans, Gretchen Wilson, 38 Special, The Allman Betts Band, Cedric Burnside, Jenny Tolman, the Atlanta Rhythm Section, Travis Denning, Johnny Lee, Rhett Akins, Scooter Brown Band, The SteelDrivers, Pure Prairie League and comedian Dusty Slay. SiriusXM‘s Storme Warren hosted.

== See also ==
- The Warren Haynes Christmas Jam
