= Down to the River =

Studio album by The Allman Betts Band
- Released: June 28, 2019
- Studio: Muscle Shoals (Sheffield, Alabama)
- Genre: Southern rock
- Length: 44:24
- Label: BMG
- Producer: Matt Ross-Spang

The Allman Betts Band chronology
| Down to the River (2019) | Bless Your Heart (2020) |

Down to the River is an album by the Allman Betts Band. Their first album, it was released as a CD and as an LP on June 28, 2019.

The Allman Betts Band includes the sons of three founding members of the Allman Brothers Band – Devon Allman (son of Gregg Allman), Duane Betts (son of Dickey Betts), and Berry Duane Oakley (son of Berry Oakley).

== Critical reception ==
In the Sarasota Herald-Tribune Wade Tatangelo wrote, "The Allman Betts Band's debut album Down to the River delivers a most welcome serving of Southern comfort.... Core members Devon Allman, Duane Betts and Berry Duane Oakley... have taken the blend of blues, rock, country and gospel pioneered by their fathers and added to that legacy with a collection of mostly original songs that brim with the kind of warm, lived-in richness rarely heard these days by contemporary bands."

Jeff Tamarkin wrote in Relix, "While some of the hallmarks of the Allman Brothers Band are embedded in their music – blame it on the DNA – they're all about keeping it contemporary.... Southern rock is alive and in good hands with The Allman Betts Band."

Stephen Thomas Erlewine said on AllMusic, "Allman and Betts are intentionally following in the footsteps of their fathers, so they've chosen to work with a limited palette, one that cherry-picks the best moments of the past. If Down to the River isn't as adventurous or hungry or exploratory as any Allman Brothers Band album, there's nevertheless a deliberately cultivated warmth that's designed to appeal to Allman fans..."

In Americana Highways David Nowels wrote, "Highlights were many for me. In fact, with each additional listen, this song or that song seemed to jump out at me in ways I missed previously. The songs stand alone well, but really underscore a collective feel for the album.... With the Allman Betts Band and Down to the River, all feels right in the world."

In Blues Rock Review Pete Francis said, "Expectations were high for this album, but the Allman Betts Band delivers the goods. It's an album where the group pays homage to its famous lineage while creating a legacy of its own."

In Rock and Blues Muse Mike O'Cull wrote, "Music at this level is about a lot more than playing and singing. Intention, spirit, and non-verbal understanding are crucial to making a band like this matter.... Down to the River is the best rock album thus far in 2019 and has the potential to be a game-changer."

In Spectrum Culture Justin Cober-Lake said, "The songwriting itself feels post-Allman Brothers, in that line, but a little more in the groove and less ready to jam; think more of a pop sensibility and less Eat a Peach.... Not surprisingly, it's a highly professional album, and in the hands of producer Matt Ross-Spang (Margo Price, Lucero and many more), it sounds great."

In Ink 19 Michelle Wilson wrote, "Allman Brothers Band fans will absolutely love this record. It's a fine line between tipping your hats to your fathers while still creating your own style, but they have managed to do just that. Every track is great."

== Track listing ==
1. "All Night" (Devon Allman, Duane Betts, Stoll Vaughan) – 4:45
2. "Shinin'" (Betts, Vaughan) – 4:29
3. "Try" (Cisco Adler, Allman) – 2:54
4. "Down to the River" (Allman, Betts, Vaughan) – 4:37
5. "Autumn Breeze" (Chris Williams) – 8:43
6. "Good Ol' Days" (Allman) – 3:39
7. "Melodies Are Memories" (Allman, Betts, Vaughan) – 4:05
8. "Southern Accents" (Tom Petty) – 4:33
9. "Long Gone" (Allman, Betts, Vaughan) – 6:33

== Personnel ==
The Allman Betts Band

- Devon Allman – electric and acoustic guitar, background vocals, lead vocals on "All Night", "Try", "Down to the River", "Good Ol' Days", "Southern Accents", "Long Gone"
- Duane Betts – electric and acoustic guitar, background vocals, lead vocals on "Shinin'", "Autumn Breeze", "Melodies Are Memories", "Long Gone"
- Berry Duane Oakley – bass, background vocals
- Johnny Stachela – slide guitar, electric guitar
- John Lum – drums
- R. Scott Bryan – percussion, background vocals

Additional musicians

- Peter Levin – Hammond B-3 organ, Wurlitzer electric piano, piano
- Matt Ross-Spang – acoustic guitar, percussion on "Shinin'", "Try", "Down to the River"
- Lamar Williams, Jr. – background vocals on "Down to the River"
- Chuck Leavell – piano on "Autumn Breeze"

Production

- Produced by Matt Ross-Spang
- Mixing: Matt Ross-Spang
- Assistant mixing engineer: Daniel Lynn
- Mastering: Pete Lyman
- Art direction, design: Charley Robinson
- Photography: Christopher Brush
