= Duane Betts =

American singer-songwriter (born 1978)

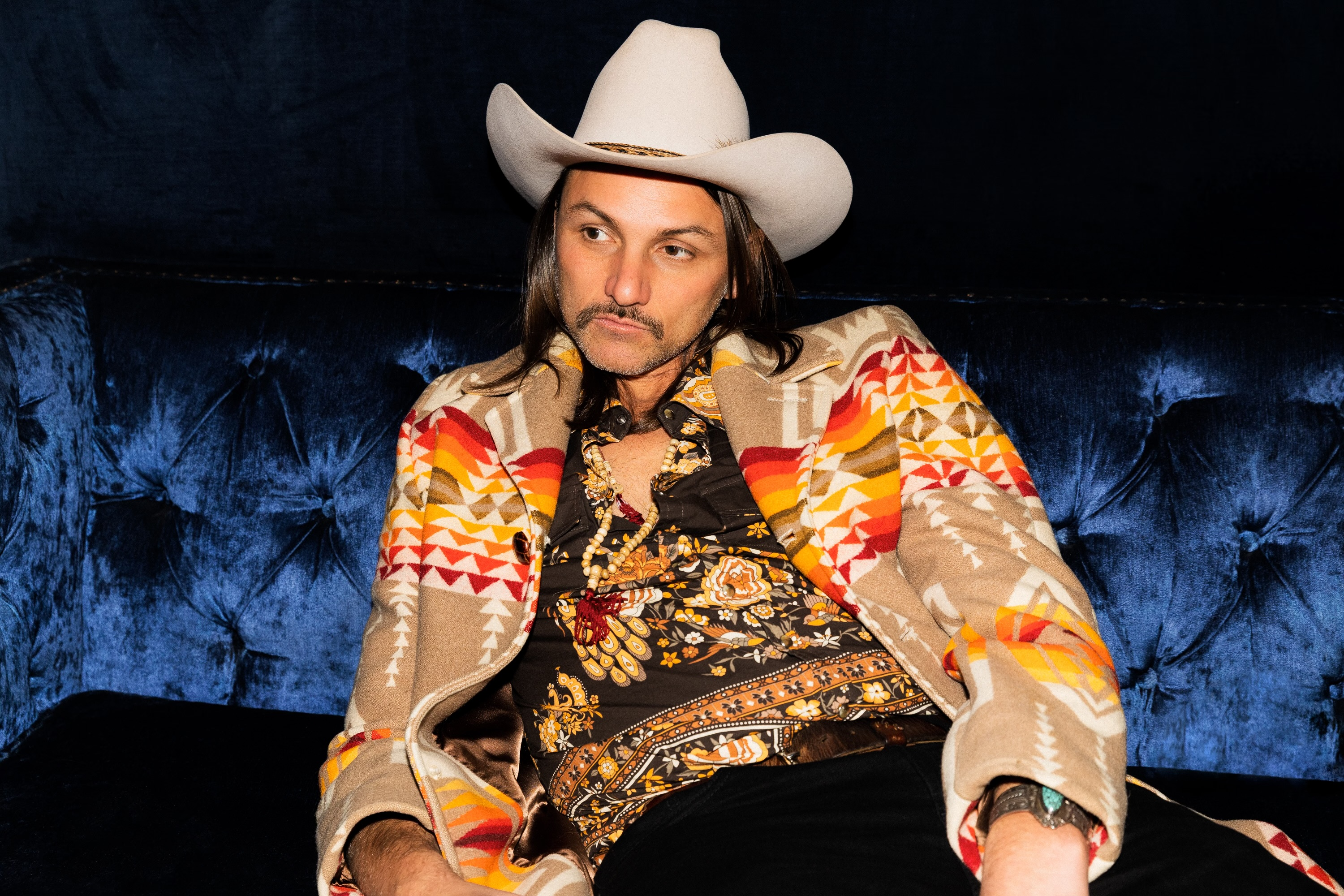
- Betts in 2023

Background information
- Born: April 16, 1978 (age 48); Sarasota, Florida
- Genres: Rock; southern rock; blues; folk; country
- Occupations: Musician, singer-songwriter
- Instrument: Guitar
- Years active: 1998–present
- Member of: Duane Betts & Palmetto Motel; The Allman Betts Band
- Formerly of: Great Southern; Dawes; Jamtown; Backbone69; Whitestarr; Duane Betts & the Pistoleers
- Website: duanebetts.com

Duane Betts (born April 16, 1978) is an American guitarist and singer-songwriter. He leads Duane Betts & Palmetto Motel, and is a co-founding member of The Allman Betts Band. He was also a guitarist and singer for Dickey Betts & Great Southern, led by his father, Dickey Betts. He was previously a member of several other groups, including Backbone69, Whitestarr, Brethren of the Coast, Dawes, Jamtown, and Duane Betts & the Pistoleers. Betts has also appeared as a session musician on many projects, including several Puddle of Mudd albums.

== Early life ==
Duane Betts was born in Sarasota, Florida, the son of Allman Brothers Band member and co-founder Dickey Betts and his then-wife, known now as Paulette Howell (née Eghiazarian). His mother is of Armenian descent. Duane was named for Duane Allman, Dickey's bandmate who was killed in a motorcycle accident in 1971.

Betts learned to play drums as a youth, then switched to guitar at age 12. At 16, he appeared onstage as a guest with The Allman Brothers Band on June 24, 1994, at the Gerald R. Ford Amphitheatre in Vail, Colorado. Later that summer, he played with the band during its appearance at the Woodstock '94 music festival.

== Career ==
In 1998, Betts joined Backbone69, a roots-rock band that also included drummer Alex Orbison, bassist Berry Oakley Jr., and lead singer Chris Williams. The group recorded its self-titled debut in 1999 at Ocean Way Nashville Recording Studios, working with producer Bobby Blazier. It was released on ORBY Records. The group disbanded in 2001 after Williams died as the result of a car crash.

Betts and Orbison formed Whitestarr (2002–2005), with singer Cisco Adler, a group that was signed by Atlantic Records (and later dropped), toured with Kid Rock, and appeared at the 2004 Coachella Festival.

In 2005, his father, Dickey, asked Betts to join Great Southern, formed in the wake of Dickey's parting with The Allman Brothers Band in 2000. Betts toured both nationally and internationally with the group, appearing on the CD/DVD Dickey Betts & Great Southern: Rockpalast 30 Years of Southern Rock 1978–2008.

Betts formed Brethren of the Coast in 2014. The group included Great Southern bassist Pedro Arevalo on guitar and Betts' former Whitestarr band member Damon Webb on bass, and was the opening artist on Dickey's final tour before retiring.

Betts officially became a touring member of folk-rock band Dawes in May 2015. Though he did not take part in the recording sessions that led to the group's 2015 album, All Your Favorite Bands, he performed with the band for the entire touring cycle of the record, including appearances on The Late Show with David Letterman, the Bonnaroo Festival, and Lollapalooza Berlin.

Reuniting with Adler, Betts joined Jamtown, a group that included Donavon Frankenreiter, G. Love, and Cody Dickinson of the North Mississippi All-Stars. The band released its debut, self-titled EP in the summer of 2017, then undertook a short Western U.S. tour, playing several festivals, including the Malibu Guitar Festival in May, and Monterey Pop 50th and Arroyo Secco Weekend in June, plus two dates supporting Jack Johnson in July, in Denver, Colorado and at the Hollywood Bowl in Los Angeles, California.

In 2017, Betts formed Duane Betts and the Pistoleers as a quartet performing his solo repertoire and covers of blues and rock classics and included guitarist Johnny Stachela. The two teamed with Gov't Mule's drummer, Matt Abts, and bassist, Jorgen Carlsson, for a one-off July performance in Santa Monica, California as Bando.

A December 8, 2017, appearance at The Fillmore in San Francisco celebrating the late Gregg Allman's 70th birthday coincided with the announcement of a 2018 World Tour with Betts as a supporting artist and guest of the Devon Allman Project with Gregg's son Devon.

In December 2018, Betts and Devon Allman announced the formation of the Allman Betts Band and recorded the group's debut album, Down to the River, at Muscle Shoals Sound Studio. Among the group's members was Berry Oakley Jr., whose father had been a member of the Allman Brothers Band with Gregg Allman and Dickey Betts.

Betts released his debut EP, Sketches of American Music, on April 26, 2018, along with a video, directed by Austin Lynch, of the record's first single, "Taking Time."

The six-song set, with sessions produced by Steve Cropper (Booker T. & the M.G.'s) and Marc Ford (Black Crowes), and executive produced by Betts, contains five originals co-written by Betts and songwriter Stoll Vaughan, as well as a cover of Dickey Betts' "California Blues."

Dickey Betts announced his return from retirement in December 2017. On May 17, 2018, he officially debuted his new band, with Duane Betts returning on guitar, at a concert in Macon, Georgia.

In 2020, The Allman Betts Band issued its second album, Bless Your Heart. After extensive touring throughout 2021, the group announced its indefinite hiatus.

In the spring of 2022, Duane Betts started sessions for a solo album. He and his band- Johnny Stachela (guitar), Berry Duane Oakley (bass), John Ginty (keyboards), and Tyler ‘Falcon’ Greenwell (drums)- recorded tracks at Derek Trucks and Susan Tedeschi's Swamp Raga studio in Jacksonville, Florida for what would be Betts’ debut solo LP, Wild and Precious Life. The album was mixed in July 2022 by Grammy-winning engineer and producer, Jim Scott.

In October 2022, Betts was a featured guest of Phil Lesh and Friends at Lesh's October 31 appearance at the Capitol Theatre. In April 2023, Betts once again joined Lesh, at the Skull and Roses Festival in Ventura, California.

Wild and Precious Life was officially released on July 14, 2023, on Royal Potato Family records. The first single, "Waiting on a Song," debuted in April 2023, followed by "Stare at the Sun," in May. The latter featured Derek Trucks guesting on guitar; one of several guests on the album, including Marcus King and Nicki Bluhm. A third single, "Saints to Sinners," was released in June. Behind-the-scenes photography for the album’s promotional materials was captured by photographer Heather Nigro.

A U.S. summer tour in support of the album commenced in June 2023, with Duane Betts & Palmetto Motel- consisting of Betts, Johnny Stachela (guitar), Pedro Arevalo (bass), and Vince Fossett Jr. (drums)- embarking on co-headlining dates in June with Maggie Rose, that included Betts’ debut at the Grand Ole Opry, and followed by Duane Betts & Palmetto Motel headlining dates and festival appearances in July and August.

== Selected discography ==
- Backbone69 – Backbone69 (1999)
- Rockpalast: 30 Years of Southern Rock (1978–2008) – Dickey Betts & Great Southern (2010)
- Jamtown – Jamtown (2017)
- Sketches of American Music – Duane Betts (2018)
- Ramblin' Man: Live at the St. George Theatre – Dickey Betts Band (2019)
- Down to the River – The Allman Betts Band (2019)
- Bless Your Heart – The Allman Betts Band (2020)
- Wild & Precious Life – Duane Betts (2023)
- Isle of Hope – Duane Betts (2026)
