= Pattern Disruptive =

Studio album by The Dickey Betts Band
- Released: October 18, 1988
- Genre: Southern rock
- Length: 49:27
- Label: Epic
- Producer: Jon Mathias; The Dickey Betts Band

Dickey Betts chronology
Atlanta's Burning Down (1978)	Pattern Disruptive (1988)	Let's Get Together (2001)

Pattern Disruptive is an album by the Dickey Betts Band, a rock group led by Dickey Betts. A guitarist, singer, and songwriter, Betts was best known as a long-time member of the Allman Brothers Band. Pattern Disruptive was his fourth album as a solo artist. It was released by Epic Records on LP and CD on October 18, 1988.

== Critical reception ==
In Get Ready to Rock Pete Feenstra wrote, "Listening to this kick ass record, it's hard to imagine that the Allman Brothers Band legend Dickey Betts was without a record contract and hadn't recorded for the best part of 7 years. He came back with a blast of an album that reprised the signature Allman Brothers twin guitar sound in the company of a young pretender, future Allman Brothers guitarist and Gov't Mule leader Warren Haynes."

In Vintage Vinyl News Andy Snipper said, "The album has the sound of the Allmans but there is a tighter rein on the music – less jamband like and more Southern rock – and the songs are more potent because of that.... Considering that the album came out originally in 1988 there is a delightful lack of over-production..."

In Pennyblackmusic Magazine Carl Bookstein wrote, "Pattern Disruptive is a typical Betts blend of blues, rock and country.... Haynes and Betts, later teammates in the Allman Brothers, always played so well together. Pattern Disruptive positively rocks from the get go.... Betts' vocals have an appealing lonesome cowboy quality."

In AllMusic William Rhulmann said, "After a long layoff, Betts cut this blistering guitar rock album in a style strongly reminiscent of the Allman Brothers Band. In fact, his band contains pianist Johnny Neel and second guitarist Warren Haynes, both of whom would join the next edition of the Allmans when they re-formed..."

== Track listing ==
1. "Rock Bottom" (Dickey Betts, Warren Haynes, Johnny Neel)
2. "Stone Cold Heart" (Betts, Haynes, Neel)
3. "Time to Roll" (Betts, Haynes, Neel)
4. "The Blues Ain't Nothin'" (Neel, Kim Morrison)
5. "Heartbreak Line" (Betts)
6. "Duane's Tune" (Betts)
7. "Under the Guns of Love" (Betts, Neel, Mike Lawler)
8. "C'est la Vie" (Betts, Neel)
9. "Far Cry" (Neel, Morrison, Haynes)
10. "Loverman" (Betts)

== Personnel ==
The Dickey Betts Band

- Dickey Betts – guitar, lead vocals
- Warren Haynes – guitar, backup vocals, lead vocals on "Time to Roll"
- Johnny Neel – keyboards, harmonica, backup vocals, lead vocals on "Far Cry"
- Marty Privette – bass, backup vocals
- Matt Abts – drums, backup vocals

Additional musicians

- Butch Trucks – percussion

Production

- Produced by Jon Mathias and the Dickey Betts Band
- Executive producer: Michael Caplan
- Recording, mixing: Jon Mathias
- Assistant engineer: David Murphy
- Mastering: George Marino
- Photography: Hans Neleman
- Letter design: Jessica Betts
- Art direction: Chris Austopchuk
