= The Collectors No. 1 =

The Collectors #1

Studio album by Dickey Betts & Great Southern
- Released: 2002
- Studio: Suite A Recording Studio, Sarasota, Florida
- Genre: Americana, Southern rock
- Length: 60:34
- Producer: Dickey Betts

Dickey Betts chronology
Let's Get Together (2001)	The Collectors #1 (2002)	Instant Live: The Odeon – Cleveland, OH 3/09/04 (2004)

The Collectors #1 is an album by Dickey Betts & Great Southern. It was released in 2002.

In contrast to the predominantly electric country rock of other Dickey Betts albums, The Collectors #1 features acoustic music, played in a variety of styles.

== Production ==
In an interview, Dickey Betts said, "I thought, I'm just going to forget about doing a commercially based record.... I just thought I'd like to do some stuff that I would enjoy doing and just see how it came out.... I didn't plan it this way but it seems to be all of the [musical styles] that have influenced my music over the years... Overall it turned out to be a real fun project to do."

In another interview, Betts said, "It took us about five weeks overall. It wasn't like we just went in and played it all live. When you hear three guitars, there really are three guitars. It's not like we overdubbed, but we did spend a lot of time rehearsing before we cut it. We really made an effort to make a good product."

Betts produced, released, and distributed the album himself, selling it at concerts and online.

== Critical reception ==
On AllMusic Thom Jurek said, "The feel is loose, and the music ranges from the Celtic "Beyond the Pale" to the loose Western swing feel on a cover of Billy Joe Shaver's "Georgia on a Fast Train", the shuffling country reading of Bob Dylan's "Tangled Up in Blue", and a B.B. King-inspired reading of "Change My Way of Livin' #2". Essentially this is the acoustic side of Great Southern, proving Betts didn't need to plug in his Les Paul to shine."

== Track listing ==
1. "Beyond the Pale" (Dickey Betts)
2. "Georgia on a Fast Train" (Billy Joe Shaver)
3. "One Stop Bebop #2" (Betts)
4. "Tangled Up in Blue" (Bob Dylan)
5. "Steady Rollin' Man" (Robert Johnson)
6. "Change My Way of Livin'" (Betts)
7. "The Preacher" (Horace Silver)
8. "Seven Turns #3" (Betts)
9. "Willy and Po' Bob" (Betts)

== Personnel ==
Great Southern

- Dickey Betts – nylon-string acoustic guitar, steel-string acoustic guitar, acoustic slide guitar, vocals
- "Dangerous" Dan Toler – steel-string acoustic guitar
- Kris Jensen – tenor saxophone, alto saxophone, flute
- Matt Zeiner – background vocals
- Frank Lombardi – percussion, background vocals
- Mark Greenberg – drums, percussion
- David Stoltz – bass guitar, upright electric bass

Additional musicians

- Dave Liles – guitar
- Lenny Ski – fiddle
- T.C. Carr – harmonica

Production

- Produced by Dickey Betts
- Mike Mahar – engineering, mixing
- Chris Musgrave – engineering, mastering, artwork, graphic design
- Bud Snyder – engineering
- Tom Colby – photography
