= Whitestarr =

American rock band

- Origin: Malibu, California, United States
- Genres: Rock
- Years active: 2000–present
- Label: Atlantic
- Members: Cisco Adler; Alex Orbison; Damon Webb; Jeramy Gritter; Tony Potato; Johnny Zambetti; Ollie Spano
- Past members: Duane Betts

Whitestarr is an American rock band from Malibu, California, United States. The band has garnered attention owing to the members' family relationships and to their television series. Lead singer Cisco Adler is the son of the record producer Lou Adler and drummer Alex Orbison is the son of Roy Orbison.

== Biography ==
Whitestarr was formed in 2000 and signed by Atlantic Records, but was later dropped. The band was virtually unknown until they became featured on the television show The Rock Life on VH1. The premise of the show is a "rockumentary" format, where cameramen follow the band inside the shows and studio and outside in their personal lives. The series was canceled during its first season due to low ratings.

Whitestarr has gained more notoriety for the personal lives and antics of the members than for any commercial success. Singer Cisco Adler was a paparazzi target while he dated Mischa Barton, Kimberly Stewart, Paris Hilton, and Lauren Conrad, while drummer Alex Orbison had been seen on the TV show LA Ink, which stars his one–time girlfriend, tattoo artist Kat Von D. Nude photos of Adler have appeared on various websites.

In September 2007, Cisco Adler announced that he had "decided to take a vacation" from the group to pursue solo projects, adding that "Whitestarr will be back".

Jeramy "Rainbow" Gritter is now performing his mix of rock and rap under the name Beardo. He was a member of the Dyslexic Speedreaders and Shoot to Kill Inc, along with Psycho Bettie, Dirt Nasty, Mickey Avalon and Andre Legacy. In 2014, Gritter became a member of Julian Casablancas + The Voidz.

On December 18, 2008, Cisco Adler was arrested in Fargo, North Dakota, following a Whitestarr concert, opening for Shwayze. Adler posted $500 bail after being booked at Cass County Jail on suspicion of simple assault.

== Members ==
- Cisco Adler - vocals
- Alex Orbison, "Orbi" - drums
- Damon Webb - bass guitar
- Jeramy "Rainbow" Gritter - guitar
- Tony Potato - dancer
- Johnny Zambetti - guitar
- Ollie Spano - guitar
- Duane Betts - guitar

=== Guests ===
- Krister Axel - Wurlitzer and B3

== Discography ==
- Luv Machine (2006)
- Fillith Tillith (2007)
