= Mick Jackson (singer) =

British singer

- Born: Michael George Jackson
- Genres: R&B, pop, soul, dance
- Occupations: Singer, songwriter, musician
- Instruments: Vocals
- Years active: 1968–present
- Label: Atlantic

Michael George Jackson is an English singer and the co-writer of the song "Blame It on the Boogie". The song was co-authored by Mick's brother David Jackson and Elmar Krohn, and produced by Sylvester Levay.

== Career ==
Jackson recorded his version of “Blame It on The Boogie” first in 1978. The Jacksons' management team picked up the song at Midem, a music industry trade fair in Cannes, France. It was then offered to the group by Mick Jackson's publisher without Jackson's knowledge. Due to a delay at the pressing plant which was producing Mick Jackson's single, in the UK the two versions were released within weeks of each other.

The press at the time enjoyed the similarity in the names and release coincidence, calling the situation 'The Battle of the Boogie' as the two records jockeyed for chart positions. Radio stations got on the battle bandwagon. BBC Radio One only played the Jacksons' version, Capital Radio only played Mick's single. The music press was equally split. Melody Maker did not review Mick Jackson's version, but praised the Jacksons and wrongly referred to their single as a "self-penned song" (16 September 1978), whereas NME hailed Mick Jackson as the winner of the battle, calling his version "far superior" (7 October 1978).

Mick Jackson's original peaked at No. 15 and the Jacksons peaked at No. 8 on the UK Singles Chart. Mick Jackson's subsequent 1979 release, "Weekend" was released in the same week as the Jacksons' second single "Destiny". The songs entered the charts on the same day, peaking at numbers 38 and 39 on the UK Singles Chart respectively, and both 'Michael Jacksons' appearing on the same edition of Top of the Pops. "Weekend" spent eight weeks on the chart; thus equalling his earlier single's tenure, and also avoiding the one-hit wonder tag.

Jackson released three albums – Weekend, Step Inside My Rainbow (both 1979) and Square Deal (1982).

He has worked with many artists such as David Knopfler, Eric Burdon, Lisa Stansfield and Barry Manilow.

In 2010, filmmaker Patrick Nation made a Channel 4 documentary about Jackson, entitled The Other Michael Jackson: Battle of the Boogie. The documentary was co-written and presented by Mick's son Sam Peter Jackson, and it led to Mick Jackson's 1978 album, Weekend, (which featured the original version of "Blame It on the Boogie") being re-released (for download on iTunes) for the first time in thirty years by Demon Music. To promote the documentary, Jackson gave a rare television interview to BBC Breakfast.

== Discography ==
=== Albums ===
- Weekend (Atlantic, 1979)
- Step Inside My Rainbow (Global Records, 1979)
- Square Deal (Blow Up Records, 1982)

=== Singles ===
| Year | Title | Peak chart positions | |
| Year | Title | US | UK |
|---|---|---|---|
| 1978 | "Blame It on the Boogie" | 61 | 15 |
| 1979 | "Weekend" | ― | 38 |
| 1979 | "You Don't Light My Fire" | ― | ― |
| 1979 | "Hangover" | ― | ― |
| 1982 | "This Is the Real Thing" | ― | ― |
| 1984 | "Rock the World (No Other Girl)" | ― | ― |
| 1988 | "Eveready" | ― | ― |
"—" denotes releases that did not chart.

== See also ==
- List of former Atlantic Records artists
- List of disco artists (L-R)
