= Drippin' Wet =

Live album by Wet Willie
- Released: March 1973
- Recorded: 31 December 1972
- Venue: The Warehouse
- Genre: Southern rock, blues rock
- Length: 44:13
- Label: Capricorn Records
- Producer: Johnny Sandlin & Stevie Smith

Wet Willie chronology
Wet Willie II (1972)	Drippin' Wet (1973)	Keep On Smilin' (1974)

Drippin' Wet is a live album by the Southern rock band Wet Willie, released in March 1973 through Capricorn Records. It was recorded on New Year's Eve 1972 in "The Warehouse" in New Orleans when opening for The Allman Brothers Band. Bassist Jack Hall said that this was the album that "finally captured the raw power and energy of our live shows" and the one they're "contacted about the most".

== Track listing ==
No.	Title	Writer(s)	Original album	Length
1.	"That's All Right"	Arthur Crudup		7:00
2.	"She Caught The Katy (And Left Me A Mule To Ride)"	Taj Mahal, Yank Rachael		3:00
3.	"No Good Woman Blues"	Milton Larkin, Sr.		3:23
4.	"Red Hot Chicken"	Hall, Hall, Ross, Anthony, Larsen and Hirsch	Wet Willie II	10:27
5.	"Airport"	John Anthony	Wet Willie II	3:21
6.	"I'd Rather Be Blind"	Leon Russell		3:30
7.	"Macon Hambone Blues"	Hall, Hall, Hirsch, Anthony, and Ross		9:40
8.	"Shout Bamalama"	Otis Redding	Wet Willie II	3:52
Total length:				44:13

== Personnel ==
=== Wet Willie ===
- Jimmy Hall – vocals, harmonica, saxophone
- Ricky Hirsch – guitar
- Wick Larsen – guitar
- John David Anthony – keyboards
- Jack Hall – bass
- Lewis Ross – drums

== Production ==
- Producer: Johnny Sandlin & Stevie Smith
- Mixing: Aaron Baron, Larry Dahlstrom and Stevie Smith
- Artwork: Carl Ramsey
- Photography: Herb Cossover

== Release and reception ==
Professional ratings
Review scores
Source	Rating
AllMusic	4/5 stars

In a retrospective review by Bruce Eder, AllMusic rated the album 4 out of 5 stars, stating that Drippin' Wet is "a surging, forceful concert recording of white Southern soul and blues-rock at its best", showcasing Wet Willie's "hard and muscular" playing, "rich and expressive" singing, and a seamless transition between "guitar-centered blues-rock" and "funkier, sax-driven sound", making it a compelling and must-listen live album for fans of the band.

== Charts ==
Chart (1973)	Peak position
US Billboard Top LPs & Tape	189
