= Atlanta's Burning Down =

Studio album by Dickey Betts
- Released: March 17, 1978
- Recorded: November 1977
- Genre: Southern rock
- Length: 33:55
- Label: Arista
- Producer: Jack Richardson, Dickey Betts

Dickey Betts chronology
| Dickey Betts & Great Southern (1977) | Atlanta's Burning Down (1978) | Pattern Disruptive (1988) |

Atlanta's Burning Down is the third studio album by Dickey Betts of the Allman Brothers Band. It was recorded with his band Great Southern in late 1977, and released in early 1978. The standout tracks are "Good Time Feeling" and "Atlanta's Burning Down". The title track is a sentimental narrative about a soldier's wife being in Atlanta during the burning of the city, while he was fighting in Virginia. The guest musicians are Bonnie Bramlett, Clydie King and Sherlie Matthews on background vocals.

== Critical reception ==
Professional ratings
Review scores
| Source | Rating |
|---|---|
| AllMusic | 4/5 stars |
| The Rolling Stone Record Guide | 2/5 stars |

The Globe and Mail wrote that "it's Betts' singing that makes this one so worthwhile, along with the expected loads of good instrumental work from the band."

On AllMusic, Thom Jurek wrote, "On his third solo outing – and his second with his backing band Great Southern – Allman Brothers lead guitarist Dickey Betts moves back into the deep-fried Southern boogie that the Brothers are (in)famous for and serves it up with just a smidgen of country and comes out with another winner.... Loud, tough, and funky, Atlanta's Burning Down is a winner."

== Track listing ==
1. "Good Time Feeling" (Dickey Betts) - 4:31
2. "Atlanta's Burning Down" (Billy Ray Reynolds) - 4:33
3. "Leavin' Me Again" (Betts, Dan Toler) - 4:17
4. "Back on the Road Again" (Betts) - 4:13
5. "Dealin' with the Devil" (Betts, Toler, Reynolds) - 3:46
6. "Shady Streets" (Betts, Toler, Reynolds) - 4:30
7. "You Can Have Her (I Don't Want Her)" (Willie Cook) - 3:53
8. "Mr. Blues Man" (Betts, Curtis Buck) - 4:12

== Personnel ==
Great Southern

- Dickey Betts - guitar, lead vocals
- "Dangerous Dan" Toler - guitar
- Michael Workman - keyboards, background vocals
- David Goldflies - bass
- David Toler - drums, percussion
- Donnie Sharbono - drums, percussion, background vocals

Additional musicians

- Topper Price - harmonica
- Reese Wynans - keyboards in "Atlanta's Burning Down"
- Bonnie Bramlett - background vocals
- Clydie King - background vocals
- Sherlie Matthews - background vocals
- Steve Wittmack - string arrangements

Production

- Produced by Jack Richardson, Dickey Betts
- Recording Engineer: Fred Torchio
- Mastering: George Marino
- Art Direction: David Richman
- Photography: Shayne Fair
