= Manorisms =

Studio album by Wet Willie
- Released: November 14, 1977
- Studio: The Manor Studio & Chipping Norton Recording Studios, Oxfordshire, England
- Genre: Rock
- Label: Epic
- Producer: Gary Lyons

Wet Willie chronology
Greatest Hits (1977)	Manorisms (1977)	Which One's Willie? (1978)

Manorisms is a 1977 album by Wet Willie and was released on the Epic Records label. The building on the cover is The Manor Studio in Shipton-on-Cherwell where much of the album was recorded. It contains the hit single, "Street Corner Serenade" (US Billboard #30).

== Track listing ==
1. "Rainman" (Mike Duke)
2. "Make You Feel Love Again" (George Jackson, Thomas Jones)
3. "So Blue" (Duke)
4. "We Got Lovin'" (Duke, Jimmy Hall, Jack Hall)
5. "Don't Turn Me Away" (Duke)
6. "Street Corner Serenade" (Duke, Jimmy Hall, Marshall Smith)
7. "One Track Mind" (Duke, Jimmy Hall)
8. "How 'Bout You?" (Duke)
9. "Doin' All the Right Things (The Wrong Way)" (Duke)
10. "Let It Shine" (Duke, Hall, Hall, Smith)

== Personnel ==
- Jimmy Hall – saxophone, lead vocals, harmonica
- Marshall Smith – guitar, backing vocals
- Larry Berwald – guitar
- Mike Duke – keyboards, lead vocals
- Jack Hall – bass, backing vocals
- Theophilus Lively – drums, backing vocals, percussion
- Fiachra Trench – orchestration on "Don't Turn Me Away" and "Let It Shine"
- Mick Glossop – engineer

== Charts ==
Chart (1978)	Peak position
Australia (Kent Music Report)	93
US Billboard 200	118
