= Weekend (Mick Jackson song) =

Single by Wet Willie

from the album Which One's Willie?
- B-side: "Mr. Streamline"
- Released: May 1979
- Genre: Pop
- Length: 3:40 (single edit); 5:59 (LP version)
- Label: Epic Records
- Songwriters: Mick Jackson, Tommy Mayer
- Producer: Lennie Petze

Wet Willie singles chronology
| "Make You Feel Love Again" (1978) | "Weekend" (1979) | "I'm Happy That Love Has Found You" (1980) |

"Weekend" is a song written by English singer-songwriter Mick Jackson and Tommy Mayer, and released in 1978 on Jackson's Weekend album. It was then covered in 1979 by the American group Wet Willie where it peaked at number 29 on the U.S. Billboard Hot 100 during the summer of that year. Jackson's version charted in the United Kingdom, reaching #38.

"Weekend" was the first release from their album, Which One's Willie? The song was their final top 40 single under the group's name before their rebranding under the name of the lead singer, Jimmy Hall. The song also charted in Canada, reaching number 34.

The song emphasizes the importance of fun and relaxation following a busy work week. The lyrics also express the urgent need to make the most of life during youth.

Radio stations WRTH-LP in Greenville, SC, KYBG in Lafayette, Louisiana, WAFN-FM in Arab, Alabama, and 70-80.it (id call NBC Milano) in Milan, Italy plays the Wet Willie version of the song at 5:00 PM every Friday as a weekend kickoff.

== Charts ==
Mick Jackson

| Chart (1979) | Peak position |
|---|---|
| UK Singles Chart | 38 |
| Italy (Musica e dischi) | 12 |

Wet Willie

| Chart (1979) | Peak position |
|---|---|
| Canadian RPM Top Singles | 34 |
| US Billboard Hot 100 | 29 |
| US Cash Box Top 100 | 29 |
