= Left Coast Live =

Live album by Wet Willie
- Released: June 1977
- Recorded: April 19, 1976
- Venue: Roxy Theatre, West Hollywood
- Genre: Blues rock, southern rock
- Length: 39:35; 59:11 (reissue)
- Label: Capricorn Records
- Producer: Paul Hornsby, Kurt Kinzel

Wet Willie chronology
The Wetter The Better (1976)	Left Coast Live (1977)	Manorism (1977)

Left Coast Live is a live album by American rock band Wet Willie, released in June 1977. It was recorded on April 19, 1976, at the Roxy Theatre in West Hollywood. The album showcases the band's energetic performances of blues rock and southern rock songs.

== Reception ==
Professional ratings
Review scores
Source	Rating
AllMusic	4.5/5 stars

AllMusic awarded Left Coast Live 4.5 out of 5 stars, praising the band's energetic performances and the blend of blues rock and southern rock styles.

== Track listing ==
No.	Title	Writer(s)	Original album	Length
1.	"No, No, No"	Michael Duke	The Wetter The Better (1976)	3:11
2.	"Grits Ain't Groceries"	Titus Turner	Wet Willie II (1972)	3:21
3.	"Everything That 'Cha Do (Will Come Back To You)"	Ricky Hirsch	The Wetter The Better (1976)	5:42
4.	"Teaser"	Michael Duke	The Wetter The Better (1976)	3:52
5.	"Lucy Was In Trouble"	Ricky Hirsch	Keep On Smilin' (1974)	11:50
6.	"Keep On Smilin'"	John Anthony	Keep On Smilin' (1974)	5:38
Total length:				39:35

1999 CD reissue
No.	Title	Writer(s)	Original album	Length
1.	"Shame, Shame, Shame"	Jimmy Reed	Wet Willie (1971)	2:57
2.	"Baby Fat"	Jack Hall, Jimmy Hall, Michael Duke, Ricky Hirsch	The Wetter The Better (1976)	3:41
3.	"Grits Ain't Groceries"	Titus Turner	Wet Willie II (1972)	3:21
4.	"Everything That 'Cha Do (Will Come Back To You)"	Ricky Hirsch	The Wetter The Better (1976)	5:47
5.	"Teaser"	Michael Duke	The Wetter The Better (1976)	4:08
6.	"Jelly Jelly"	Billy Eckstine, Earl Hines	(first time available)	12:52
7.	"Country Side Of Life"	Ricky Hirsch	Keep On Smilin' (1974)	3:44
8.	"Ring You Up"	Michael Duke	The Wetter The Better (1976)	5:29
9.	"Lucy Was In Trouble"	Ricky Hirsch	Keep On Smilin' (1974)	12:14
10.	"Keep On Smilin'"	Jack Hall, Jimmy Hall, John Anthony (16), Lewis Ross, Ricky Hirsch*	Keep On Smilin' (1974)	5:49
11.	"No, No, No"	Michael Duke	The Wetter The Better (1976)	4:12
Total length:				59:11

- tracks 1,2,6,7 and 8 are added on reissue

== Personnel ==
- Jimmy Hall - lead vocals, saxophones, harmonica
- Mike Duke - lead vocals on "Teaser", harmony vocals, piano, clavinet
- Jack Hall - bass guitar, harmony vocals
- Lewis Ross - drums
- Ricky Hirsch - lead guitar
- John Anthony - Moog, electric piano, ARP String Ensemble, organ, rhythm guitar

== Production ==
Produced by Paul Hornsby, Kurt Kinzel

== Charts ==
Chart (1977)	Peak position
US Billboard Top LPs & Tape	191
