= Let's Get Together (Dickey Betts Band album) =

Studio album by The Dickey Betts Band
- Released: July 31, 2001
- Genre: Rock
- Length: 75:30
- Label: Free Falls Entertainment
- Producer: Dickey Betts

Dickey Betts chronology
Pattern Disruptive (1988)	Let's Get Together (2001)	The Collectors #1 (2002)

Let's Get Together is an album by the Dickey Betts Band, a rock group led by Dickey Betts. It was Betts's fifth album as a solo artist, and his first after he left the Allman Brothers Band in 2000. It was released on July 31, 2001.

== Critical reception ==
Professional ratings
Review scores
Source	Rating
AllMusic	4/5 stars
Entertainment Weekly	B+
The Music Box	3/5 stars

On AllMusic Thom Jurek said, "Let's Get Together is a good-time, swinging, blues and New Orleans R&B-drenched romp through the roots of American music.... Betts is too much of a musician to have to show off, and he has nothing whatsoever to prove – though it's true no one could have guessed he was such a fine arranger.... Though he hasn't done any solo records in a while, this cannot be considered Dickey Betts' comeback; he's simply stepped out on his own again..."

In Entertainment Weekly Tom Sinclair wrote, "Give it up for Betts. Ousted from the Allman Brothers Band after three decades, the virtuoso axman turns around and delivers a stomping-good Saturday night album.... a solid and cohesive disc – a joyful jambalaya of jazz, blues, country, and Latin rock tunes – graced by Betts' distinctively fluid playing."

Billboard said, "After his unceremonious 2000 ousting from the band he helped propel to stardom, celebrated Allman Brothers Band guitarist Dickey Betts put his own group together, and the result is a fine collection of jam-heavy blues rock songs.... Production-wise, the mix is strangely muffled in places, sometimes muting the obvious exuberance of Betts and his band, but it's still a fine ride and quite a statement regarding Betts and his still-potent skills."

In The Music Box John Metzger wrote, "... Betts has returned – albeit it with a new band in tow – and his latest release Let's Get Together is a solid, if not magnificent, effort that salvages what could have been a rather precipitous downfall.... the Dickey Betts Band does do a respectable job in offering plenty for fans to enjoy by turning in a solid effort that occasionally strikes a few impressive chords."

== Track listing ==
1. "Rave On" (Dickey Betts) – 3:42
2. "Let's All Get Together" (Betts) – 4:39
3. "Immortal" (Matt Zeiner) – 4:26
4. "Tombstone Eyes" (Betts) – 5:51
5. "Here Come the Blues Again" (Betts) – 7:39
6. "One Stop Be-Bop" (Betts) – 10:12
7. "I Gotta Know" (Mark May) – 8:08
8. "Call Me Anytime" (Zeiner) – 4:40
9. "Dona María" (Betts) – 12:16
10. "All for You" (May) – 7:08
11. "Sing While I'm Walkin'" (Betts) – 6:41

== Personnel ==
The Dickey Betts Band

- Dickey Betts – guitar, vocals
- Mark May – guitar, vocals
- Matt Zeiner – organ, piano, vocals
- Kris Jensen – tenor, alto, and soprano saxophone
- David Stoltz – bass
- Mark Greenberg – drums
- Frankie Lombardi – drums, percussion, background vocals

Additional musicians

- Shascle Yochim – background vocals on "Let's All Get Together" and "Immortal"
- Donna Bonelli – background vocals on "Let's All Get Together"

Production

- Produced by Dickey Betts
- Co-producer, engineer: Bud Snyder
- Assistant engineer: Mike Mahar
- Mixing: Bud Snyder, Dickey Betts
- Mastering: Vlado Meller
- Photography: Robert Parente
- Artwork, design, layout: G. Newyear & Co.
