= Alex Orbison =

American drummer (born 1975)

Alex "Orbi" Orbison
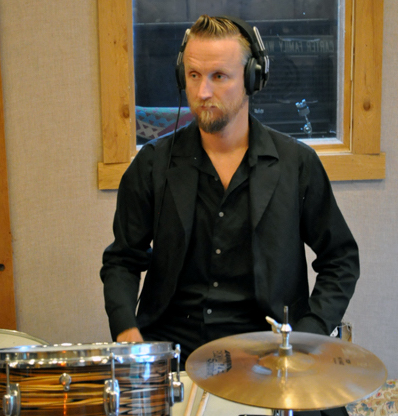
- Orbison in 2013
- Born: May 25, 1975 (age 51); Hendersonville, Tennessee, U.S.
- Other name: Orbi
- Occupations: Musician; publisher; film producer; film director
- Spouse: Erika Wolf
- Children: 2
- Parent(s): Roy Orbison; Barbara Orbison
- Musical career
- Instruments: Drums; vocals
- Years active: 2000–present
- Labels: Sony Legacy; Atlantic
- Member of: The Allman Betts Band
- Formerly of: Whitestarr
- Website: stillworkingmusicgroup.com/alexorbison/

Alexander Orbison (born May 25, 1975), also known as Orbi, is an American drummer, writer, director, and film producer. He is the president of Still Working Music Group, a publishing company. He is also president and co-founder of Roy's Boys LLC, which manages the legacy of his father, musician Roy Orbison; the organization also includes his brothers, Roy Orbison Jr. and Wesley Orbison.

== Biography ==
Orbison is the youngest son of Roy Orbison and Barbara Orbison, born on May 25, 1975. He is their second-born child, following Roy Kelton Orbison Jr., born October 18, 1970. He has an older half-brother, Wesley Orbison. In addition, he had two older brothers from Roy's first marriage who died in a fire. They lived on Old Hickory Lake, next door to his god-parents Johnny Cash and June Carter Cash in Hendersonville, Tennessee. Growing up in a musical household, Orbi's first instrument was violin, as his hands were too small for the guitar, followed by guitar and piano before landing on drums. After Roy travelled to California to co-write with Jerry Lynn Williams and Will Jennings, Roy decided to move his family to Malibu, California, in 1985.

Following the death of his mother in 2011, Orbison moved back to Nashville, Tennessee, after promising her he would "get down to Nashville and take care of business" following her battle with pancreatic cancer. He currently lives there with his wife, Erika Wolf Orbison, and two children, Eden Orbison (b. September 27, 2018) and Wylie Cozy Wolf Orbison (b. February 14, 2021).

In 2024, Orbison joined The Allman Betts Band replacing their former drummer, R. Scott Bryan, who died in December 2023.

== Early musical career ==
In the early 1990s, Orbison made friends with Jerry Lynn Williams' son Chris Williams, co-founding a band called Backbone69. Along with guitarist–vocalist Williams and drummer Orbison, Backbone69 included guitarist Duane Betts, son of the Allman Brothers' Dickey Betts, and bass player Berry Oakley Jr., son of Allman Brothers bassist Berry Oakley.

In 1992, Orbison took his first professional position in publishing with Don Williams Music Group, but as Backbone gained popularity amongst the community, Orbison left his position in publishing to tour with Backbone69.

In 2001, Chris Williams was in a fatal car accident, which led to the dissipation of the band. As Betts described it, "It was like the tribe lost its chief."

While Williams was alive, the members of Backbone frequently played as backing band for the son of Lou Adler, Cisco Adler's project called Whitestarr. After Williams' death, Cisco invited the boys of Backbone to formally join the band.

In 2003, Orbison played drums for Simon Dawes' debut EP, Stories From Hollywood.

After signing with Atlantic Records in 2000 and a television series on VH1, Whitestarr disbanded in 2008.

== Executive career ==
Since 2012, Orbison has been president of the publishing company, Still Working Music Group and Roy's Boys LLC, managing his father's catalog with his brothers.

=== Mystery Girl Deluxe (2014) ===
Alex Orbison • Executive Producer, Liner Notes

For the 25th anniversary of the posthumously released Mystery Girl, a Deluxe version was released with a new song "The Way is Love" . The record was mixed at the Cash Cabin Studio, produced by John Carter Cash, remastered by Richard Dodd and released on Sony Legacy. The bonus track "The Way Is Love" includes guitar, vocals and drumming by the Orbison brothers – Alex, Roy Jr. and Wesley with the vocal by their father.

=== One of The Lonely Ones (2015) ===
Alex Orbison • Producer, Executive Producer, Liner Notes

One of The Lonely Ones, recorded between January and August 1969, was previously unreleased due to a "logjam of releases". The album was mixed at the Johnny Cash Cabin, produced by Alex and Chuck Fleckenstein, remastered by Richard Dodd and released on Sony Legacy.

=== The MGM years 1965–1973 (2015) ===
Alex Orbison • Producer, Executive Producer, Liner Notes

The MGM Years box set was a complete reissue of all 13 records made during Roy Orbison's deal with MGM Records. All 13 records were re-mixed at the Johnny Cash Cabin, produced by Alex and Chuck Fleckenstein, remastered by Richard Dodd and released on Sony Legacy.

=== Roy Orbison: The Ultimate Collection (2016) ===
Alex Orbison • Producer, Executive Producer

"Roy's son, Alex Orbison, painstakingly selected songs that were most representational of his father's vast catalog, which totals 27 studio albums, four live albums, and over 60 singles, 22 of which placed in the U.S. Billboard Top 40 chart. Narrowing it down was no easy task. 'It is a great honor for me and my brothers, Wesley and Roy Jr., to finally and definitively distill our father's entire career onto a single disc as best one can possibly do and, certainly, as never done before,' said Alex. 'It is the result of years of research, archiving and listening, and it is with supreme and heartfelt pleasure that we will be able to share it with the world.'"

=== Black & White Night 30 (2017) ===
The remastered version of the Roy Orbison and Friends: A Black and White Night was released February 27, 2017, with Orbison as producer.

=== The Authorized Roy Orbison (2017) ===
The estate-authorized biography was released October 17, 2017. The book is written by Alex, his brothers Roy Jr. and Wesley Orbison alongside Jeff Slate.

=== A Love So Beautiful (2017) ===
A Love So Beautiful: Roy Orbison With the Royal Philharmonic Orchestra was released November 17, 2017. Alongside the Royal Philharmonic Orchestra, Orbison contributed to the making of this record. The philharmonic recorded in Abbey Road Studios.

=== Only The Lonely (2018) ===
Alex Orbison • Co-Producer

Orbison and his brothers signed on for the first ever estate authorized biopic, written by Ray Gideon and Bruce A. Evans. The film will be co-produced by Alex Orbison alongside Marty Katz and Roy Kelton Orbison Jr., executive produced by Chuck Fleckenstein, Wesley Orbison and Ron Moore.

=== The Beatle Who Vanished ===
Alex Orbison • Co-Producer

Alex, along with close friend Ashley Hamilton secured the rights to The Beatle Who Vanished, the 2013 book by Jim Berkenstadt about Jimmie Nicol who filled in for Ringo Starr for 13 days during the Beatles' 1964 world tour.

== Discography ==
=== with Roy Orbison ===
- A Love So Beautiful: Roy Orbison With the Royal Philharmonic Orchestra (2017)
- Roy Orbison: Black & White Night 30 (2017)
- Roy Orbison: The Ultimate collection (2016)
- The MGM Years (2015)
- One of The Lonely Ones (2015)
- Mystery Girl: Deluxe 25th Anniversary Edition (2014)

=== with Whitestarr ===
- Fillith Tillith (2007)
- Luv Machine (2006)

=== with Backbone69 ===
- "Backbone69" (1999, re-issued 2016)

== Filmography ==
- Roy Orbison: Mystery Girl – Unraveled (2014)
- Roy Orbison: One of the Lonely Ones (2015)
- Roy Orbison: Black and White Night 30 (2017)
- Only the Lonely (2018)
