= The Allman Betts Band =

American rock band

- Genres: Southern rock; country rock; Americana
- Years active: 2018–present
- Label: BMG
- Members: Devon Allman; Duane Betts; Johnny Stachela; John Lum; John Ginty; Alex Orbison; Justin Corgan; David Gomez
- Past members: R. Scott Bryan; Berry Duane Oakley
- Website: allmanbettsband.com

The Allman Betts Band is an American rock group. Formed in November 2018, it originally included the sons of three founding members of the Allman Brothers Band – Devon Allman (son of Gregg Allman), Duane Betts (son of Dickey Betts), and Berry Duane Oakley (son of Berry Oakley). The band plays mostly original songs, with some covers of Allman Brothers songs mixed in. They have toured nationally and internationally, and have released two albums – Down to the River (2019) and Bless Your Heart (2020).

The members of the Allman Betts band are Devon Allman (guitar, vocals), Duane Betts (guitar, vocals), Johnny Stachela (guitar, vocals), John Ginty (keyboards), Justin Corgan (bass), David Gomez (saxophone, percussion), Alex Orbison (drums, percussion, vocals), and John Lum (drums).

On January 25, 2022, the band reported that they would be taking a break from recording and touring and would be working on solo material. They reunited to play at Norfolk Harborfest on June 9, 2023.

The band returned to touring in May and June 2024 with their "King Crawler" American tour. Alex Orbison joined the band on drums, replacing R. Scott Bryan who died in December 2023. In November and December 2025 the band played a "Family Revival" tour of 20 concerts.

== Discography ==
- Down to the River – June 28, 2019 – BMG
- Bless Your Heart – August 28, 2020 – BMG
