= Dickey Betts & Great Southern (album) =

Studio album by Dickey Betts
- Released: October 1977
- Recorded: 1977
- Studio: Criteria, Miami, FL
- Genre: Southern rock
- Length: 34:31
- Label: Arista
- Producer: Dickey Betts

Dickey Betts chronology
Highway Call (1974)	Dickey Betts & Great Southern (1977)	Atlanta's Burning Down (1978)

Dickey Betts & Great Southern is the second studio album by Dickey Betts of the Allman Brothers Band. It was recorded with his band Great Southern in 1977. The standout tracks are "Sweet Virginia" and the extended-jam "Bougainvillea", which was co-written by Don Johnson.

== Critical reception ==
Professional ratings
Review scores
Source	Rating
AllMusic	3/5 stars
Christgau's Record Guide	C+

On AllMusic, Tom Jurek wrote, "Attempting to capture the loose, easy feel of Highway Call and combine it with the more blues-driven sound of the Allmans, Betts was largely successful though the record does suffer a tad from overly slick production.... Great Southern is a very fine album that despite its polish holds a wealth of fine songs and truly astonishing playing within its grooves."

== Track listing ==
1. "Out to Get Me" (Dickey Betts) – 4:45
2. "Run Gypsy Run" (Betts, Curtis Buck, Jim Paramore) – 3:34
3. "Sweet Virginia" (Betts) – 3:44
4. "The Way Love Goes" (Betts) – 5:03
5. "Nothing You Can Do" (Betts) – 5:05
6. "California Blues" (Betts) – 5:04
7. "Bougainvillea" (Betts, Don Johnson) - 7:16

== Personnel ==
Great Southern

- Dickey Betts – electric guitar, slide guitar, lead vocals
- "Dangerous Dan" Toler – electric guitar, acoustic guitar, background vocals
- Tom Broome – keyboards, background vocals
- Ken Tibbets – bass
- Jerry Thompson – drums, percussion
- Donnie Sharbono – drums, percussion

Additional musicians

- Don Johnson – backing vocals on "Bougainvillea"
- Topper Price – harmonica on "Out to Get Me" and "Run Gypsy Run"
- Mickey Thomas – backing vocals on "Nothing You Can Do"

Production

- Produced by Dickey Betts
- Recording, production assistant: Steve Klein
- Assistant engineer: Stephen Hart
- Mixing: Johnny Sandlin, Buddy Thornton
- Mastering: George Marino
- Art Direction: Bob Heimall
- Photography: Benno Friedman
