= Highway Call =

Studio album by Dickey Betts
- Released: September 1974
- Recorded: 1974
- Studios: Capricorn, Macon, Georgia
- Genres: Country rock, Western swing
- Length: 35:28
- Label: Capricorn
- Producers: Johnny Sandlin, Dickey Betts

Dickey Betts chronology
Highway Call (1974)	Dickey Betts & Great Southern (1977)

Highway Call is the debut solo album by Dickey Betts (under the name Richard Betts) of the Allman Brothers Band. It was recorded in 1974 in Macon, Georgia, at Capricorn Studios. Betts further develops the country sound that emerged on the Allmans' 1973 album Brothers and Sisters. Tracks include "Long Time Gone", "Highway Call", and the extended country jam "Hand Picked". Guest musicians include Vassar Clements on fiddle and Jeff Hanna on acoustic guitar. The album peaked at No. 19 on Billboard's "Pop Albums" chart in 1974.

== Critical reception ==
Professional ratings
Review scores
Source	Rating
AllMusic	4.5/5 stars
The Encyclopedia of Popular Music	3/5 stars
Tom Hull	C−
MusicHound Rock: The Essential Album Guide	4/5 stars
The Rolling Stone Album Guide	2.5/5 stars

No Depression called the album "exuberant," writing that "Betts conjured a rollicking brew of bluegrass, western swing, and jazz." The Rolling Stone Album Guide wrote that Betts's "hesitant vocals can't match the pace of his lightning fingers." AllMusic said "Highway Call stands as the artist's finest solo moment, one that holds his true voice easily expressing itself far from the madding blues wail of the Allmans..."

== Track listing ==
All tracks composed by Dickey Betts, except "Kissimmee Kid" by Vassar Clements

1. "Long Time Gone" – 4:31
2. "Rain" – 3:40
3. "Highway Call" – 4:26
4. "Let Nature Sing" – 5:10
5. "Hand Picked" – 14:20
6. "Kissimmee Kid" – 3:13

== Personnel ==
- Dickey Betts - electric guitar, acoustic guitar, dobro, lead vocals
- Vassar Clements - fiddle
- Chuck Leavell - piano
- Tommy Talton - acoustic guitar
- John Hughey - steel guitar
- Walter Poindexter - banjo, backing vocals
- Leon Poindexter - acoustic guitar, backing vocals
- Frank Poindexter - dobro, backing vocals
- Stray Straton - bass, backing vocals
- Johnny Sandlin - bass
- Oscar Underwood Adams - mandolin
- David Walshaw - drums, percussion
- Jeff Hanna - acoustic guitar
- Reese Wynans - harmonica
- The Rambos - (Buck, Dottie, and Reba) - backing vocals

Production

- Producer: Johnny Sandlin, Dickey Betts
- Recording Engineer: Sam Whiteside, Johnny Sandlin
- Remixing: Johnny Sandlin
- Mastering Engineer: George Marino
- Photography: Sydney Smith

== Charts ==
Chart (1974)	Peak position
US Top LPs & Tape (Billboard)	19
