= John Ginty =

American organist

- Born: January 1, 1972 (age 54)
- Origin: New Jersey, U.S.
- Genres: Blues, rock, gospel, Jam band
- Occupations: Organist, keyboardist, session musician
- Instruments: Hammond B3, keyboards, synthesizer, drums
- Years active: 1991–present
- Labels: Shark Tank, American Showplace Music
- Member of: The Allman Betts Band
- Formerly of: Robert Randolph and the Family Band, Rose Hill, John Ginty Band
- Award: Jammy Award for Best New Band (2001)

John Ginty (born 1972) is an American organist, keyboard player, and session musician. He was a founding member of Robert Randolph's "Family Band", and is often seen guesting with such jamband luminaries as the Allman Brothers, Santana, Govt. Mule, Bob Weir and Ratdog, Widespread Panic. In 2001 at the Roseland Ballroom in New York, Ginty was the recipient of the Jammy Award for best new band alongside his Family Bandmates. Ginty has spent a large portion of his career working as a session musician.

== Biography ==
Ginty started his career playing a local New Jersey band called "Rose Hill" where he transitioned from a drummer to playing the Hammond B3. He played in this band from approximately 1991 to 1994. Then in 1996 he played organ on Neal Casal’s record Fade Away Diamond Time, which led him to play on records by Whiskeytown, James Iha, and Hazeldine, before joining Jewel’s touring band for MTV Unplugged, Saturday Night Live, the first Lilith Fair tour in 1998, and the following Papillion Tour in 1999. The following years saw him playing on records by Citizen Cope, Matthew Sweet, and Shannon McNally.

In 2000, Ginty got together with pedal steel player Robert Randolph, and helped him form the “Family Band”, which consisted of Randolph, Ginty, and Robert's cousins Danyel Morgan on bass, and Marcus Randolph on drums. After a year of touring, the Family Band released Live At the Wetlands in 2002. The album is a live recording of the band at the famed NYC club recorded by producer Jim Scott. The band recorded a studio follow-up in 2002 again with producer Jim Scott, called Unclassified, which garnered the band two Grammy nominations, one for best rock instrumental performance 46th Grammy Awards and for Best Rock Gospel Album. In that same year, the band backed the legendary Blind Boys of Alabama on the Grammy winning release Higher Ground. According to People Magazine, “John Ginty's organ nicely complement the Blind Boys' vigorous jubilee-style gospel, creating a sound that will indeed take you higher.“

2004 saw Ginty playing on records by Bad Religion, Tift Merritt, Neal Casal, and The Clarence Greenwood Recordings by Citizen Cope, where Ginty is credited with playing Keyboards, Organ, Synthesizer, and Synthesizer Strings. While continuing his session work and touring with Citizen Cope, in 2006 Ginty formed the New Jersey–based John Ginty Band. They released a live record called Fireside Live, recorded in Denville, New Jersey. It is the first recording to showcase Ginty as a bandleader. The recording includes guest performances by Ratdog's Mark Karan, and J.T. Thomas from Bruce Hornsby's band. The record was released on Ginty's own label, Shark Tank Records. Glide Magazine said of the record, “Fireside Live is loads of fun, as if Joey DeFrancesco or Little Jimmy Scott traded in the more academic jazz aesthetic (but retained same chops and improvisational proclivities) to front a boozy gospel-rock outfit Ginty’s taken to calling “outlaw gospel.” He has played with such artists as Jewel, Matthew Sweet, Citizen Cope, Santana, Robert Randolph and the Family Band, Court Yard Hounds, the Dixie Chicks, and many others. as well as the critically acclaimed Like A Bird, Like a Plane by Charlie Mars.

In 2013, Ginty got together with producer Ben Elliott, and began work on his first official studio release, Bad News Travels. The record features special guests Warren Haynes, Martie Maguire, Neal Casal, Alecia Chakour, Albert Castiglia, Todd Wolfe, and Cris Jacobs. They recorded it at Elliott's Showplace Studios in Dover, New Jersey, on the vast collection of vintage analog gear that resides there. Bad News Travels features ten songs, all written by Ginty, and was released September 12, 2013, on Elliott's American Showplace Music label. The new CD has garnered many favorable reviews. Relix Magazine said "Creating a seemingly effortless blend of blues, classic rock, funk and soul, Ginty utilizes his past experience as well as numerous special guests. One minute Todd Wolfe is confidently weaving a guitar solo in the smooth "Peanut Butter" and the next minute, vocalist Alecia Chakour is strutting about on the soulful and spunky "Seven & The Spirit."

Keyboard Magazine February 2014 issue featured lessons by John Ginty. Several books mention John Ginty including Strangers Almanac by Michael Heaplie on page 47 which talk of Ginty's participation in the making of Ryan Adams' Whiskeytown, one of the biggest selling country music albums of all time. An excerpt from the book can be found here Another book to mention Ginty's important musical contributions is Jambands by Dean Budnick on page 182

In 2013, Ginty was called upon again by Jim Scott to play on a record by the Court Yard Hounds called Amelita. He then joined the Dixie Chicks touring band, playing keyboards on their “Long Time Gone Tour”.

On June 11, 2014, John Ginty entered the Showplace Studios to record the Bad News Travels Live DVD. Ginty recreated music from his Bad News Travels CD. Guesting were Albert Castiglia, Todd Wolfe, Cris Jacobs, Jimmy Bennett and Alexis P. Suter.

In November 2019, Ginty joined the newly formed Allman Betts Band.

== Discography ==
Year	Album	Artist	Credits
1995	Fade Away Diamond Time	Neal Casal	Organ, Piano, Wurlitzer
1996	Rain, Wind & Speed	Neal Casal	Organ (Hammond), Piano
1997	Field Recordings	Neal Casal	Organ, Piano, Wurlitzer
1997	Strangers Almanac	Whiskeytown	Keyboards, Organ (Hammond), Piano, Piano (Electric), Wurlitzer
1998	Basement Dreams	Neal Casal	Composer, Engineer, Mixing, Organ, Piano, Producer
1998	Christmas to Remember	Velvel	Bells, Organ, Piano
1998	Let It Come Down	James Iha	Melodica, Organ (Hammond)
1999	In Reverse	Matthew Sweet	Electric Harpsichord, Organ, Piano, Piano (Electric), Tack Piano
1999	Mustango	Jean-Louis Murat	Wurlitzer
2000	Jumbo	Bill Kelly	Organ (Hammond), Piano
2001	Charmed	Matthew Harrison	Keyboards
2001	Get Used to It	Wings over Water	Keyboards, Organ (Hammond)
2001	Onion Dream	Meghan Cary	Keyboards, Organ, Piano
2001	Pulling up Atlantis	Demolition String Band	Organ
2001	Sad Girl	Amy Allison	Organ, Piano
2001	Sway	Kathy Phillips	Keyboards, Organ (Hammond), Piano
2002	33 1/3 Grand Street	Mark Geary	Organ (Hammond)
2002	Citizen Cope	Citizen Cope	Handclapping, Organ, Percussion, Piano
2002	Dream of Love	Todd Sheaffer	Organ (Hammond), Piano
2002	Higher Ground	The Blind Boys of Alabama	Organ (Hammond), Piano, Wurlitzer
2002	Live at the Wetlands	Robert Randolph & the Family Band	Organ (Hammond)
2002	Shaman	Santana	Keyboards, Organ
2003	Lonely for a Lifetime	Dana Fuchs	Organ (Hammond), Piano
2003	Poor Man's Son	Franky Perez	Organ (Hammond)
2003	To My Surprise	To My Surprise	Musician
2003	Unclassified	Robert Randolph & the Family Band	Composer, Organ (Hammond), Piano
2004	Austin City Limits	Music Festival: 2003	Organ (Hammond), Piano
2004	Deep Field South	Cargun	Keyboards, Organ, Producer
2004	Leaving Traces: Songs 1994-2004	Neal Casal	Melodica, Organ, Organ (Hammond), Piano, Wurlitzer
2004	"Los Angeles Is Burning" [US Single]	Bad Religion	Organ (Hammond)
2004	The Clarence Greenwood Recordings	Citizen Cope	Keyboards, Organ, Synthesizer, Synthesizer Strings
2004	The Empire Strikes First	Bad Religion	Organ (Hammond)
2005	Geronimo	Shannon McNally	Composer
2006	Every Waking Moment	Citizen Cope	Arp Strings, Bells, Clavinet, Fender Rhodes, Keyboards, Melodica, Organ (Hammond), Piano, Synthesizer
2006	Fireside Live	John Ginty	Keyboards, Organ
2006	The Bridge	The Bridge	Additional Personnel, Organ
2006	Matt Angus	Matt Angus	Organ (Hammond), Piano
2006	No Wish to Reminisce	Neal Casal	Organ (Hammond)
2006	There and Back Again	Wiser Time	Hammond B3 Organ, Piano
2007	And Then There Were None	Cargun	Piano, Producer
2007	Bread on the Waters	Bill Kelly	Piano
2009	Like a Bird, Like a Plane	Charlie Mars	Hammond B3 Organ, Piano
2009	Roots and Wings	Neal Casal	Hammond B3 Organ
2011	Warren Haynes Presents the Benefit Concert, Vol. 4	Warren Haynes	Group Member, Organ
2012	Blackberry Light	Charlie Mars	Hammond B3 Organ, Keyboards, Piano
2012	Living the Dream	Albert Castiglia	Hammond B3 Organ, Piano
2012	One Lovely Day	Citizen Cope	Keyboards, Piano
2012	Sweeten the Distance	Neal Casal	Hammond B3
2013	Amelita	Court Yard Hounds	Hammond B3 Organ, Percussion, Piano
2013	World of Strangers	Zoe Muth	Hammond B3
2013	All Over the Map	John Kasper	Hammond B3
2013	Bad News Travels	John Ginty	Composer, Hammond B3, Piano, Piano (Electric)
2013	Before the Sun Comes Up	John David Kent	Keyboards, Organ
2013	Morning Glory	Mary Macgowan	Hammond B3, Piano
2013	The Product	Cosmic American Derelicts	Clavinet, Hammond B3, Piano, Synthesizer
2013	Too Long Coming	Bill Griese	Composer, Drums, Keyboards, Mixing, Percussion, Producer
2015	Electric Woman	Eliana Cargnelutti	Hammond B3 Organ, Piano
2016	John Ginty Performs Music of Elvis Presley at The Roller Rink	John Ginty	Hammond B3 Organ
2020	Bless Your Heart	The Allman Betts Band	Keyboards
