= Keep On Smilin' (Wet Willie song) =

Single by Wet Willie

from the album Keep On Smilin'
- B-side: "Soul Jones"
- Released: May 1974
- Genre: Southern rock
- Length: 3:25
- Label: Capricorn Records
- Songwriters: Jimmy Hall; Jack Hall; Ricky Hirsch; John David Anthony; Lewis Ross
- Producer: Tom Dowd

Wet Willie singles chronology
"Keep On Smilin'" (1974)	"Country Side of Life" (1974)

Official audio
- "Keep On Smilin'" on YouTube

"Keep On Smilin'" is a 1974 hit song by the American group Wet Willie. It was the title track of their third studio album.

The song was also the first of their three top-40 singles and became their greatest hit. "Keep on Smilin'" reached No. 10 on the U.S. Billboard Hot 100 chart and is ranked as the 66th biggest hit of 1974. It also charted in Canada.

== Charts ==
=== Weekly charts ===
Chart (1974)	Peak position
Canadian RPM Top Singles	21
US Billboard Hot 100	10
US Cash Box Top 100	16

=== Year-end charts ===
Chart (1974)	Rank
Canada	181
US Billboard Hot 100	66
