= Dickey Betts =

American guitarist (1943–2024)

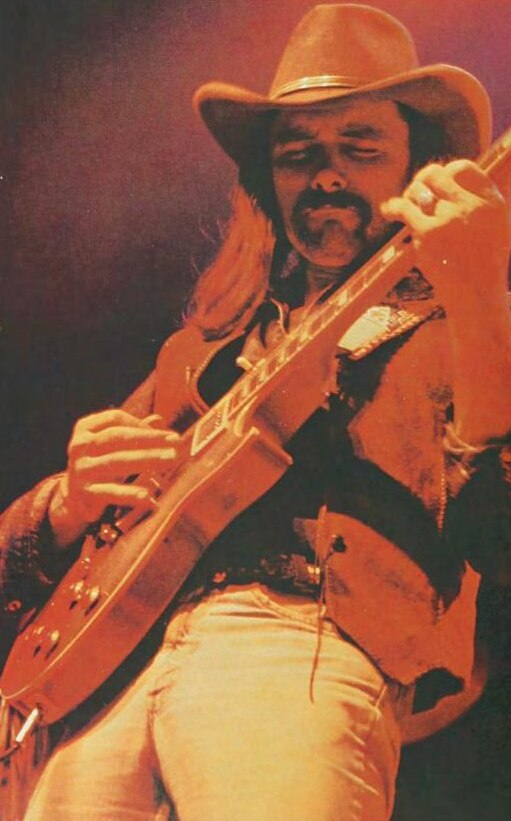
- Betts in 1978

Background information
- Also known as: Dickey Betts; The Ramblin' Man
- Born: Forrest Richard Betts; December 12, 1943; West Palm Beach, Florida, U.S.
- Died: April 18, 2024 (aged 80) Osprey, Florida, U.S.
- Genres: Rock; country; blues; jazz; Southern rock; jam band
- Occupations: Musician; songwriter
- Instruments: Guitar; vocals
- Years active: 1960–2018
- Formerly of: The Allman Brothers Band; Dickey Betts & Great Southern; Dickey Betts Band; Betts, Hall, Leavell and Trucks
- Website: dickeybetts.com

Forrest Richard "Dickey" Betts (December 12, 1943 – April 18, 2024) was an American rock guitarist and vocalist, best known as a longtime member of the Allman Brothers Band. A co-founder with Duane Allman of the band in 1969, he was central both to the group's rise to critical acclaim in 1971 and its greatest commercial success in the mid-1970s, and was the writer and vocalist on the Allmans' hit single "Ramblin' Man". The Allman Brothers Band broke up and re-formed twice, always with Betts in the lineup, until he was forced out of the group in 2000.

Starting in 1974, Betts also fronted his own bands, performing concerts and recording records. He released albums as Dickey Betts and Great Southern, the Dickey Betts Band, and under his own name.

== Career ==
=== Early days ===
Betts was born in West Palm Beach, Florida, on December 12, 1943, and raised in Bradenton. He grew up in a musical family listening to traditional bluegrass, country music, and Western swing. He started playing ukulele at the age of 5 and, as his hands got bigger, moved on to mandolin, banjo, and guitar.

By the age of 16, Betts was feeling the need for something "a little faster", and played in a series of rock bands on the Florida circuit, up the East Coast and into the Midwest. In 1967 he formed the Second Coming in Florida with Berry Oakley. According to rock guitarist and composer, Rick Derringer, the group called the Jokers referenced in his song "Rock and Roll, Hoochie Koo" was one of Betts's early groups of that name.

=== First Allman Brothers Band period ===
In 1969, guitarist Duane Allman, a veteran of the South's "Chitlin' Circuit" of roadhouses and small local venues, had already formed several bands with recording contracts, but was casting for talent to build another. Also a successful session player, he had gained a deal with R&B impresario Phil Walden, who planned to back an Allman-led power trio. Instead, the six-member Allman Brothers Band was formed of Duane Allman, singer-songwriter and keyboardist Gregg Allman, Betts, bassist Berry Oakley, and drummers Butch Trucks and Jai Johanny Johanson. Duane, who later worked with famed British guitarist Eric Clapton, earning notice for his standout playing on the "Layla" double-album, once said with typical modesty of Betts: "I'm the famous guitar player, but Dickey is the good one."

In the initial Allman Brothers lineup, the twin lead-guitar lineup of Betts and Duane Allman drove the band's sound, introducing distinctive melodic twin guitar harmony and counterpoint. Betts gained initial renown for his instrumental, "In Memory of Elizabeth Reed", from the band's second album, Idlewild South (1970), and the pair's guitars feature prominently on the band's breakthrough live double album At Fillmore East (1971). Betts' last contribution to the original lineup was the striking guitar duet-driven "Blue Sky" on Eat a Peach (1972). The latter, his last electric guitar recording with Duane Allman, featured his first lead vocal and signaled a new, more country-oriented sound and direction.

After Duane Allman's death in October 1971, Betts became the band's sole lead guitarist, with the addition of pianist Chuck Leavell bringing the group back up to six members. Bassist Lamar Williams joined the band after the November 1972 death of Berry Oakley. Betts took on a greater singing, composing, and leadership role. He practiced slide guitar intensively in order to be able to cover many of Duane's signature parts. He wrote the song "Jessica", inspired by his young daughter of that name, and the Allmans' highest-charting single, "Ramblin' Man", for the band's 1973 breakout commercial success Brothers and Sisters.

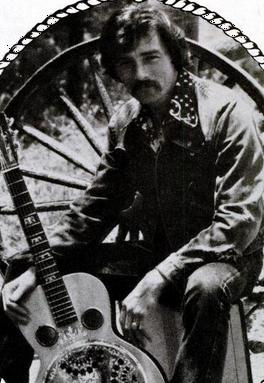
Betts in 1974

Betts's first solo album, Highway Call, was released in 1974 and featured fiddle player Vassar Clements.

After the Allman Brothers disbanded for the first time in 1976, Betts released more albums, starting with Dickey Betts & Great Southern in 1977, which included the song "Bougainvillea", co-written with future Hollywood star and then Florida transplant Don Johnson. In 1978 he released Atlanta's Burning Down.

=== Second Allman Brothers Band period ===
The Allman Brothers Band reformed in 1979 and released the album Enlightened Rogues, with two members of Great Southern replacing Allman Brothers members who chose not to participate in the reunion: guitar player Dan Toler for pianist Chuck Leavell, and bassist David Goldflies for bassist Lamar Williams. Several albums and personnel changes followed until declining record and concert ticket sales, personnel issues, and management problems led the group to disband again in 1982.

Betts formed another band, Betts, Hall, Leavell and Trucks, where he was co-frontman along with former Wet Willie singer, saxophonist, and harmonica player Jimmy Hall. Despite earning good notices, the group was unable to secure a recording contract and disbanded in 1984. Betts returned to his solo career, performing live at smaller venues and releasing the album Pattern Disruptive in 1989.

=== Third Allman Brothers Band period ===
When a one-off reunion tour was proposed in support of the Allman Brothers' Dreams box set, released in 1989 to commemorate the band's 20th anniversary, Betts's solo band again supplied the Allman Brothers' other lead guitarist, Warren Haynes. The success of the one-off tour resulted in a permanent reunion, which absorbed Betts's energies during the 1990s. This band lineup released three studio albums between 1990 and 1994 and won the praise of the critics. In 1994, Haynes and Allmans bassist Allen Woody formed Gov't Mule with former Dickey Betts Band drummer Matt Abts as a side project, and they left the Allman Brothers for Gov't Mule full-time in 1997. They were replaced by Jack Pearson on guitar and Oteil Burbridge on bass. In 1999 Derek Trucks replaced Pearson as Betts's co-lead guitarist.

Betts was replaced on numerous Allman Brothers tour dates throughout the mid-to-late 1990s for what were reported in the media as "personal reasons". Betts's last show with the Allman Brothers was at the Music Midtown Festival in Atlanta, Georgia, on May 7, 2000. A breaking point was reached after that show and before the launch of the band's Summer Campaign Tour when the remaining original Allman Brothers members – Gregg Allman, Butch Trucks, and Jaimoe – suspended Betts. According to Betts, the band told him (reportedly via fax) to "get clean" (from alcohol and/or drugs). He was temporarily replaced for the 2000 tour by Jimmy Herring, formerly of the Aquarium Rescue Unit. When Betts filed suit against the other three original Allman Brothers Band members, the separation turned into a permanent divorce.

=== Later career ===
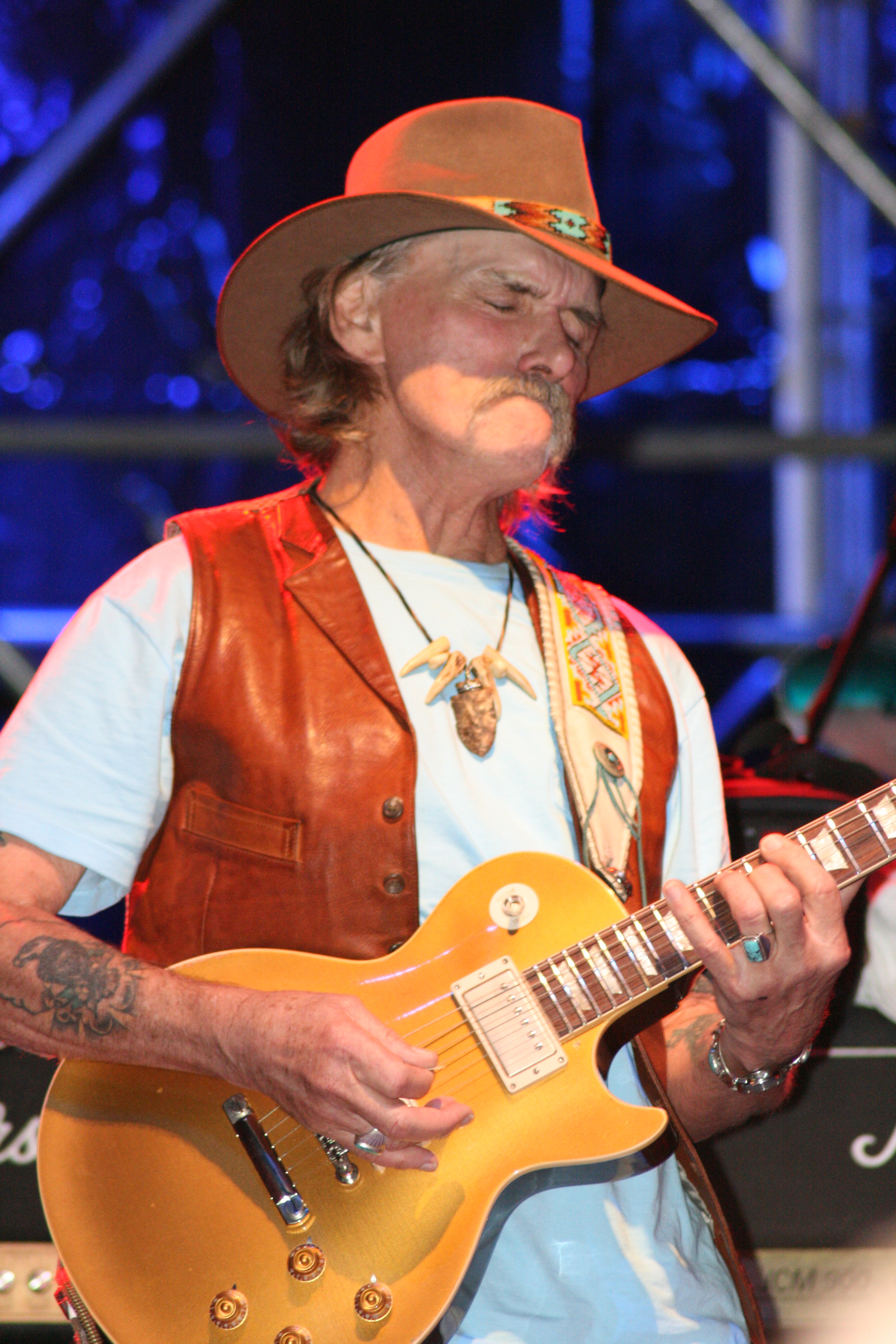
Betts in 2008

Betts re-formed the Dickey Betts Band and toured that same summer. The band reassumed the name Dickey Betts & Great Southern and added Betts's son Duane Betts (named after Duane Allman) on lead guitar. In 2005, Betts released the DVD Live from the Rock and Roll Hall of Fame.

Betts's final album release was Official Bootleg Vol. 1 (2021), a two-CD live album of Dickey Betts and Great Southern performances from the 2000s.

Betts was inducted into the Rock and Roll Hall of Fame as a member of the Allman Brothers Band in 1995, and also won a best rock performance Grammy Award with the band for "Jessica" in 1996. Betts was ranked No. 58 on Rolling Stone's 100 Greatest Guitarists of All Time list in 2003, and No. 61 on the list published in 2011.

== Artistry ==
=== Playing style ===
Betts is widely considered one of the greatest guitarists of all time, with a sound and style that was "distinguished by an ingenious blend of blues, rock, country, Western swing, and Appalachian string music." Warren Haynes described Betts' lead work as having "a singing quality and [a] melodic ease that pulled the listener along."

As a co-founder of the Allman Brothers Band, Betts and fellow guitarist Duane Allman developed a unique co-lead style of playing in contrast to the traditional rhythm and lead roles of rock guitar. Their playing heavily featured harmony lines, counterpoints, unison melodies, and extended solos, with songs like "In Memory of Elizabeth Reed" and "Blue Sky" often cited as standout examples of their combined style. Their harmonies, however, were not the result of careful planning; rather, they happened spontaneously, with Betts often starting a melody and Allman improvising off of him. Haynes noted that much of the "magic" of the Betts/Allman pairing stemmed from their willingness to make mistakes and that as a result a lot their note choices were not always "correct" from a technical perspective. Betts himself said this approach led to both good and bad performances, but stated this willingness to be spontaneous produced results that could not be achieved through extensive rehearsing.

Despite their co-lead roles, Betts was often overshadowed by Allman, and it was only after Allman's death in 1971 that Betts' reputation began to grow. After being fired from the Allman Brothers, Betts began writing a monthly column for Guitar World called True Grit, in which he discussed his history of playing guitar and analyzed his work. The column was popular among readers.

=== Equipment ===
Betts was a notable fan of the Gibson Les Paul, relying primarily on a 1954 model and a 1957 Goldtop. The Goldtop—used on songs like "Ramblin' Man" and known to fans as "Goldie"—was later painted red by Betts, who felt that the original finish's drastic oxidation had left it looking too unappealing. In the late 1990s and early 2000s, Gibson released two signature models for Betts, one based on the Goldtop before it was refinished and one based on its red repainting. Betts typically played through two 50-watt Marshall Super Lead amp heads, each running into a pair of 4x12 Marshall cabinets loaded with JBL-made Lansing 120 speakers. For indoor venues, he used one of the Marshall stacks; for outdoor shows, he used both.

In 1973, Betts was one of the first guitarists to receive a custom Alembic model but rarely used it. In the 1990s, Betts sometimes played a Fender Stratocaster with a Seymour Duncan "Hot Rail" humbucker, and he later began playing PRS McCarty models. Other guitar models Betts used during his career included the Gibson ES-335 and Gibson SG in early Allman Brothers Band days, gifting the SG to Duane Allman for use in open tuning slide guitar playing. For a time, he used a Soldano SLO-100 amp.

== Personal life ==
Betts was born in West Palm Beach, Florida. He lived in the Sarasota metropolitan area for most of his life, with a notable span in Macon, Georgia, during the formative years of the Allman Brothers Band.

Betts was married five times, lastly to Donna, in 1989. He had four children: Kimberly, Christy, Jessica, and Duane. Christy is married to Frank Hannon of the band Tesla. Jessica is the namesake of Betts's instrumental composition. Duane, named for Betts's former bandmate Duane Allman, is also a musician who has performed and recorded with his father, and with Gregg Allman's son Devon in the Allman Betts Band.

Although they had been separated personally and as musical bandmates for more than 15 years, Betts and Gregg Allman reconciled before Allman's death in 2017.

In August 2018, the 74-year old Betts suffered a mild stroke and had to cancel tour dates with his Dickey Betts Band. Following an accident at his home in Osprey, Florida, he was admitted to hospital in critical but stable condition. On September 20, 2018, he successfully underwent surgery to relieve swelling on his brain. In a statement posted on his website, Betts and his family said the "outpouring of support from all over the world has been overwhelming and amazing. We are so appreciative."

Betts died of cancer and chronic obstructive pulmonary disease at his home in Osprey, Florida, on April 18, 2024, at the age of 80.

== Discography ==
As a solo artist or band leader

- Highway Call (1974) – Richard Betts – US No. 19
- Dickey Betts & Great Southern (1977) – Dickey Betts & Great Southern – US No. 31
- Atlanta's Burning Down (1978) – Dickey Betts & Great Southern – US No. 157
- Pattern Disruptive (1988) – Dickey Betts Band – US No. 187
- Let's Get Together (2001) – Dickey Betts Band
- The Collectors #1 (2002) – Dickey Betts & Great Southern
- Instant Live: The Odeon – Cleveland, OH 3/09/04 (2004) – Dickey Betts & Great Southern
- Bougainvillea's Call: The Very Best of Dickey Betts 1973–1988 (2006) – Dickey Betts
- The Official Bootleg (2007) – Dickey Betts & Great Southern
- Rockpalast: 30 Years of Southern Rock (1978–2008) (2010) – Dickey Betts & Great Southern
- Live at the Coffee Pot 1983 (2016) – Betts, Hall, Leavell, and Trucks
- Live from the Lone Star Roadhouse (2018) – Dickey Betts
- Ramblin' Man: Live at the St. George Theatre (2019) – Dickey Betts Band
- Official Bootleg Vol.1 (2021) – Dickey Betts & Great Southern

With the Allman Brothers Band

- The Allman Brothers Band (1969)
- Idlewild South (1970)
- At Fillmore East (1971, live)
- Eat a Peach (1972, part live)
- Brothers and Sisters (1973)
- Win, Lose or Draw (1975)
- Wipe the Windows, Check the Oil, Dollar Gas (1976, live)
- Enlightened Rogues (1979)
- Reach for the Sky (1980)
- Brothers of the Road (1981)
- Seven Turns (1990)
- Shades of Two Worlds (1991)
- An Evening with the Allman Brothers Band: First Set (1992, live)
- Where It All Begins (1994)
- An Evening with the Allman Brothers Band: 2nd Set (1995, live)
- Peakin' at the Beacon (2000, live)

With other artists

- RFK Stadium, Washington, D.C. 6/10/73 (2023) – Grateful Dead
