= Stoll Vaughan =

American singer-songwriter

- Born: Lexington, Kentucky, U.S.
- Genres: Alternative country, Americana music, Soul
- Instruments: Guitar, vocals
- Label: Commonwealth Artist
- Website: Stoll Vaughan

Stoll Vaughan is an American singer-songwriter from Lexington, Kentucky. He is the great-nephew of United States Senator John Sherman Cooper. Vaughan began his professional music career as guitar player for the Indiana band Chamberlain. He attended the Interlochen Arts Academy in Interlochen, Michigan.

Vaughan has toured through much of the United States as well as Europe. In the Netherlands, his debut album was named one of "Alternative Country's Top Ten Records of the Year." He has toured with John Mellencamp and John Fogerty's 'Words and Music' tour, Farm Aid, Def Leppard, Journey, Shooter Jennings, Marty Stuart, Robert Earl Keen, James McMurtry, and Don Williams.

Vaughan's first two CD releases Love Like a Mule, and Hold On Through Sleep and Dreams both landed in the Top 10 of the Americana Music Charts.

Vaughan's music has been featured on television shows such as; True Blood, Friday Night Lights, Shameless (U.S. TV series), and The Office (U.S. TV series) (3 songs in the series finale). He composed original music for the David Lynch Interview Project that won a webbie, as well as music for The Making of There Will Be Blood Blu-ray Release.

Vaughan is actively composing original musical content for a new amazon TV pilot to be released in August 2014. Aside from his own compositions and performances, Stoll Vaughan is currently Head of A&R for CUT Recordings where he is writing and developing various singer-songwriters- including Duane Betts. Vaughan and Betts wrote and produced a song for the movie World Made Straight starring Steve Earle released in February 2015.

In his free time Vaughan guest lectures for the University of Montana Entertainment Management Program where he offers his professional insight in artist development.

Vaughan's latest project The Living Record is a live recording continuation done in CUT Recordings studio in front of a live audience.

== Discography ==
- 2005 – Hold on Thru Sleep and Dreams [Shadow Dog]
1. "Desire"
2. "Nowhere"
3. "Sounds of the City"
4. "No Use to Me Now"
5. "I-75"
6. "Coming to Me Now"
7. "Pride Hides"
8. "American Life"
9. "Leaf on a River"
10. "Memories"
- 2006 – Love Like a Mule [Shadow Dog]
1. "Alright"
2. "No Stopping"
3. "Savior"
4. "Man That Cares"
5. "Complain"
6. "Between You and I"
7. "Fade Away"
8. "Lonesome"
9. "Seen Moments"
10. "Love Like a Mule"
11. "Head Above the Wheel"
- 2010 – The Weatherman Dualtone
1. "The Weatherman"
2. "Troubles"
3. "Coming Back Now"
4. "Further Down the Line"
5. "Whistling in the Dark"
6. "Closer Stoll Vaughan"
7. "Meet You in the Middle"
8. "War On Love"
9. "Maria"
