= Wet Willie =

American rock band

- Origin: Mobile, Alabama, U.S.
- Genres: Southern rock
- Years active: 1970–1980; 1990-present
- Labels: Capricorn; Epic; Hittin' the Note
- Members: Jimmy Hall; Jack Hall; Donna Hall Foster; T.K. Lively; Bobby Mobley; Ric Seymour; Ricky Chancey
- Past members: Lewis Ross; Ricky Hirsch; John David Anthony; Wick Larsen; Ella Brown Avery; Elkie Brooks; Leslie Hawkins; Mike Duke; Marshall Smith; Larry Berwald
- Website: www.wetwilliemusic.com

Wet Willie is an American southern rock band from Mobile, Alabama. Their best-known song, "Keep On Smilin'", reached No. 10 on the U.S. Billboard Hot 100 chart in August 1974. Several other of the group's songs also appeared on the singles charts in the 1970s, which utilized their soulful brand of Southern rock.

== History ==
Drummer Lewis Ross assembled the musicians for a group called "Fox" in the summer of 1969, and after relocating from Mobile, Alabama to Macon, Georgia, home of Capricorn Records, became known as "Wet Willie" in 1970. The band made its name playing Southern rock from 1971 until 1979, producing a number of albums and several charting singles, one of them achieving top ten success. They first became known to concertgoers as the opening act for the Allman Brothers Band in 1971, and still perform today. When Jimmy Hall is with the band, it is billed as Wet Willie, otherwise as The Wet Willie Band.

== Band members ==
The core members of the band during that period were Jimmy Hall, vocals, harmonica, saxophone; Jimmy's brother Jack Hall on bass; John David Anthony on keyboards; Ricky Hirsch on guitar, and Lewis Ross on drums and percussion. Wick Larsen was added as a second guitarist for a brief stay during the Wet Willie II album period. The duo of women singing background vocals dubbed "The Williettes" were a staple of the classic Wet Willie sound that featured Jimmy and Jack's sister, Donna Hall, and Ella Brown Avery. For a short period of time in 1974, the British singer Elkie Brooks joined the band as a backing singer, as did future Honkette Leslie Hawkins. Michael Duke debuted on the album Dixie Rock adding keyboards and vocals, and stayed with the band through their tenure in the Southern rock era. A period of personnel and record label changes followed and in 1978 with a new Epic Records contract the new line-up included Jimmy and Jack Hall, Mike Duke, drummer T.K. Lively, and guitarists Marshall Smith and Larry Berwald through 1980. After a brief hiatus the band regrouped in 1990 featuring the siblings Jimmy, Jack and Donna Hall, along with original keyboardist John David Anthony, drummer T.K. Lively and long-time members guitarists Ric Seymour and Ricky Chancey.

== Recordings ==
Wet Willie put out several albums on Capricorn Records between 1971 and 1977. Along with a "Greatest Hits" album released on Polydor Records, they also released two more final studio albums on Epic Records, although some hits collections and further live recordings have been released as recently as 2006. Perhaps their best-known LP is the 1973 live album, Drippin' Wet, but their main claim to fame is the hit single, "Keep On Smilin,'" which reached No. 10 on the Billboard Hot 100. They also enjoyed some other Billboard charting singles with "Country Side of Life," "Everything That 'Cha Do (Will Come Back to You)", "Leona," and from their Epic Records period, "Street Corner Serenade" and "Weekend" from the LPs Manorisms and Which One's Willie?

About the "Keep On Smilin'" album cover guitarist Rick Hirsch recalls: "there is a picture of us sitting in front of a liquor store (for effect, I’m sure) in downtown Macon that is inset on a full sleeve backdrop and photo of Rev Pearly Brown, a blind street singer and guitarist who was local. He had a sign he wore around his neck that said something close to “God loves a cheerful giver…” I don’t know who designed the cover, but have to assume they made a connection between Rev Brown’s persona and what was decided to be the title of the album, ‘Keep On Smilin’,’ as it was pretty built in from the image that he had a pretty tough life and the message is, well, “Keep On Smilin’.”

== Current formations ==
In 2012, Wet Willie released a new live CD Miles of Smiles on the Hittin' The Note Records label. They continue to tour with three original members including original lead singer Jimmy Hall, brother Jack Hall on bass and vocals, sister Donna Hall Foster on vocals, as well as other long-time members, drummer T.K. Lively, Ric Seymour on guitar and vocals, Ricky Chancey on guitar and newest member, keyboardist Bobby Mobley.

== Achievements ==
- Inducted into the Alabama Music Hall of Fame - 2016
- Inducted into the Georgia Music Hall of Fame - 2014

== Discography ==
=== Studio albums ===
Title	Details	Peak chart positions	
Title	Details	US	AUS
Wet Willie	Release date: 1971; Label: Capricorn; Formats: LP, Cassette, 8-track	—	—
Wet Willie II	Release date: 1972; Label: Capricorn; Formats: LP, Cassette, 8-track	—	—
Keep On Smilin'	Release date: 1974; Label: Capricorn; Formats: LP, Cassette, 8-track	41	—
Dixie Rock	Release date: 1975; Label: Capricorn; Formats: LP, Cassette, 8-track	114	—
The Wetter The Better	Release date: 1976; Label: Capricorn; Formats: LP, Cassette, 8-track	133	—
Manorisms	Release date: November 14, 1977; Label: Epic; Formats: LP, Cassette, 8-track	118	93
Which One's Willie?	Release date: 1979; Label: Epic; Formats: LP, Cassette, 8-track	172	—
"—" denotes releases that did not chart

=== Live albums ===
Title	Details	US
Drippin' Wet	Release date: 1973; Label: Capricorn; Formats: LP, Cassette, 8-track	189
Left Coast Live	Release date: 1977; Label: Capricorn; Formats: LP, Cassette, 8-track	191
High Humidity (as The Wet Willie Band)	Release date: 2004; Label: Fuel 2000 Records; Formats: CD	—
Miles of Smiles	Release date: 2012; Label: Hittin' the Note Records; Formats: CD	—

=== Compilation albums ===
Title	Details	US
Greatest Hits	Release date: 1977; Label: Capricorn; Formats: LP, Cassette, 8-track	158
The Best of Wet Willie	Release date: 1994; Label: Polydor/Chronicles; Formats: CD, Cassette	—
The Best of Wet Willie: 20th Century Masters/The Millennium Collection	Release date: 2003; Label: Mercury; Formats: CD	—
Epic Willie (The Epic Recordings)	Release date: 2005; Label: Acadia; Formats: CD	—
"—" denotes releases that did not chart

=== Singles ===
Year	Title	Peak chart positions		
Year	Title	US	CAN	AUS
1971	"Rock & Roll Band"	—	—	—
1972	"Shout Bamalama"	—	—	—
1974	"Keep On Smilin'"	10	21	—
1974	"Country Side of Life"	66	—	—
1975	"Leona"	69	92	—
1975	"Dixie Rock"	96	—	—
1976	"Everything That 'cha Do"	66	—	—
1976	"Baby Fat"	—	—	—
1977	"Street Corner Serenade"	30	30	41
1978	"Make You Feel Love Again"	45	62	—
1979	"Weekend"	29	34	—
1979	"Ramona"	—	—	—
"—" denotes releases that did not chart.
