= Jimmy Hall =

American musician

Jimmy Hall (born April 26, 1949) is the lead singer and harmonica player for the Southern rock group, Wet Willie.

Hall was born in Birmingham, Alabama, and raised in Mobile, Alabama to parents Jack Hall and Mattie LaVera Richardson, also known as Nanny. Hall has five siblings: Jack Jr, Donna, Cindy, Susie, and Travis. Nanny was a pianist and singer, and was well known locally. Jack Sr. did not have any actual music prowess, yet loved music. Donna and Jack Jr. are also musicians.

He first gained recognition in 1970 as the lead vocalist, saxophonist, and harmonica player for Wet Willie, a band he and his siblings founded. The band’s R&B-infused rock and roll style propelled its biggest hit, "Keep On Smilin’", into the Top 10 on the Billboard singles chart in 1974. The band was originally called Fox; however, the name was changed due to another band having that name.

Wet Willie released five albums with Capricorn Records before moving to Epic Records in 1977, where its singles "Street Corner Serenade" and "Weekend" charted in the Top 40.

In 1980, Hall scored a solo hit with the single "I'm Happy That Love Has Found You" (US No. 27, AC No. 30). In May 1982, Hall peaked at No. 77 with the song "Fool for Your Love".

From 1982 to 1984, he was one of two frontmen of the group Betts, Hall, Leavell and Trucks.

In 1985, he sang lead vocals on Jeff Beck's album Flash and was nominated for a Grammy for the performance. Hall has also toured with Hank Williams Jr., playing saxophone and harmonica.

== Discography ==
- Touch You (1980) Epic (Billboard 200 No. 183)
- Cadillac Tracks (1982) Epic
- Flash (1985) Epic
- Rendezvous with Blues (1996) Capricorn
- Triple Trouble (2003) Telarc (with Tommy Castro, Lloyd Jones, Tommy Shannon & Chris Layton)
- All Night All Stars (2003) Capitol
- The Mighty Jeremiahs (2005) ear X-tacy (with Greg Martin, Mark Hendricks & Jon McGee)
- Build Your Own Fire (2007) Zoho Music
- Shoals Rhythm Collective (2007) Music Avenue
- Jeff Beck Live at the Hollywood Bowl (2017) Eagle Vision
- Ready Now (2022) Keeping the Blues Alive
