= One Way Out (song) =

1962 blues song

Single by Sonny Boy Williamson II
- Released: January 1962
- Recorded: Chicago, September 8, 1961
- Genre: Blues
- Length: 2:00
- Label: Checker
- Songwriters: Willie Dixon, Sonny Boy Williamson II (single credits)
- Producers: Leonard Chess, Phil Chess, Willie Dixon

"One Way Out" is a blues song that was recorded in the early 1960s by both Sonny Boy Williamson II and Elmore James. A reworking of the song by G. L. Crockett, titled "It's a Man Down Here", appeared on the Billboard record charts in 1965. Its A Man Down There was recorded and released by The Sir Douglas Quintet in 1966. In 1971, the Allman Brothers Band recorded an updated live version of the song, which was included on their popular Eat a Peach album (1972).

== Early recordings ==
=== Elmore James ===
Bluesman Elmore James recorded "One Way Out" during his last sessions for record producer Bobby Robinson. Unlike James' earlier recordings, Robinson used a full-band arrangement with a four-piece horn section, instead of James' usual backing band, the Broom Dusters. The recording took place at his second session for Beltone Studios in New York City in late 1960. Unlike many of his recordings, James did not use slide guitar:

Elmore James' cover of the tune is a good example of his standard-tuning, non-slide, lead playing. He soloes in the first and second moveable pentatonic scale patterns, and played swingy backup chord chops.

James' version was not released until 1965, two years after his death. The song was paired with "My Bleeding Heart", which was recorded during the same sessions, for release as a single by Sphere Sound Records. The song is included on several compilations of James' recordings for Robinson, such as the King of the Slide Guitar box set (1992).

=== Sonny Boy Williamson II ===
On September 8, 1961, Sonny Boy Williamson II recorded the song for the Chess brothers in Chicago. Williamson, on vocal and harmonica, was backed by Otis Spann on piano, Robert Lockwood and Luther Tucker on guitars, Willie Dixon on bass, and Fred Below on drums. In January 1962, Chess affiliate Checker Records released it on a single with "Nine Below Zero". A contemporary review of new single releases by Billboard magazine staff indicated its "strong sales potential": "A vigorous performance from Williams [sic] here on a traditional blues theme. Side moves along at a brisk pace with Latin beat and strong harmonica and group work." In a retrospective review by Bill Dahl for the All Music Guide to the Blues (1996) included "Sly son-of-a-gun he was, old Sonny Boy Williamson found a way to weld the twist [popular dance music style] to the blues with his rousing 1961 [recording]."

Williamson recorded a second version with Buddy Guy on guitar, that Chess included on Williamson's first compilation for the label, The Real Folk Blues (1965). At 2:45, the album version is 45 seconds longer than the single version and uses a rhythmic figure that shares some elements with Ray Charles' popular 1959 song "What'd I Say" and Bobby Parker’s 1961 “Watch Your Step”. The Allman Brothers Band later based their version on Williamson's second recording of the song.

=== G. L. Crockett ===
In 1965, blues artist G. L. Crockett, from Carrollton, Mississippi, recorded a reworking of the song, titled "It's a Man Down There", for 4 Brothers Records. His rendition is based on Williamson's song, although it has been described as a "Jimmy Reed sound-alike". Acknowledging the similarity, Reed recorded an answer song the same year titled "I'm the Man Down There". Of the three early singles, "It's a Man Down There" was the only one to appear on the charts. It reached number 10 on the Billboard Top Selling Rhythm & Blues Singles chart, and number 67 on its broader Hot 100.

== Songwriting credits ==
Dixon biographer Mitsutoshi Inaba notes that "One Way Out" was a spontaneous composition by Williamson. Marshall Chess described Williamson's approach to songwriting:

What's interesting about him, Sonny Boy, I don't think he ever wrote down songs in his life. He just was a spontaneous artist. He'd come in totally unprepared to do a recording, make up the songs, write them in his head, and they would just come out.

However, commentary on James' version indicates that he and Williamson were co-writers; early in their careers, the two regularly performed together, with Williamson backing James on his first recording session in 1951.

Writing credits for "One Way Out" have varied over the years. On the early singles, they are given as "Dixon, Williamson" (Williamson), "Sehorn, James" (James), and "Crockett, Daniels" (Crockett). Willie Dixon, Marshall Sehorn, and Jack Daniels handled production, management, or technical aspects for the record companies; (Note: In his autobiography, Willie Dixon does not list "One Way Out" among his songwriting credits nor mention the song.) in order to share the income generated by sales, it was a common practice to add credits for some who were not involved in the actual songwriting.

The copyright registrations generally follow the single credits. Although his was the first to be released, Williamson's registration was the last to be submitted. All were all filed in 1965:

- James single – Elmo James & Marshall Sehorn, Rhinelander Music, February 23, 1965
- Crockett single – George Crockett & Jack Daniels, June 18, 1965
- Williamson single and album – Sonny Boy Williamson, Arc Music, November 12, 1965

== Allman Brothers Band version ==
"One Way Out"

Single by the Allman Brothers Band

from the album Eat a Peach
- B-side: "Stand Back"
- Released: September 1972
- Recorded: June 27, 1971
- Venue: Fillmore East, New York City
- Genre: Southern rock; blues rock
- Length: 3:40 (single version); 5:08 (album version)
- Label: Capricorn
- Songwriters: Elmore James, Marshall Sehorn (single credits)
- Producer: Tom Dowd

The Allman Brothers Band singles chronology
"Melissa" (1972)	"One Way Out" (1972)	"Ramblin' Man" (1973)

Returning to the original title, The Allman Brothers Band is known to have been playing "One Way Out" in concert from at least February 1971. A live recording was included on their 1972 album Eat a Peach. This was indeed recorded at the Fillmore East, but unlike the March 1971 live material used on the rest of Eat a Peach and At Fillmore East, "One Way Out" was recorded at the venue's final show on June 27, 1971, as producer Tom Dowd thought that to be their definitive effort on the song.

In this punchy, dynamic performance, the Allmans demonstrated their abilities in the blues-rock roadhouse style. Guitarist Dickey Betts sets up the Sonny Boy Williamson boogie vamp, while Duane Allman comes in over the top with bottleneck slide guitar part, after which vocalist Gregg Allman narrates the drama of the song. Betts takes a solo, Gregg instructs the audience "Ahh, put your hands together," and Duane Allman and Betts trade guitar licks. Duane Allman then takes the solo. Bassist Berry Oakley actually comes in a beat early after the guitar trade, but the band recovers quickly, and then drops out as Gregg carries the vocal a cappella, after which the band returns for the "Big Ending".

The recording of the song from Eat a Peach became popular on progressive rock and album-oriented rock radio formats, especially as it was under five minutes in length and more convenient to play than some of the band's lengthier jams; it remains quite popular on classic rock radio. "One Way Out" became a staple of Allmans concerts in the decades since, often used as an encore and stretched in length.

The Eat a Peach "One Way Out" is included in Martin Scorsese Presents the Blues: A Musical Journey, a box set accompanying his 2003 documentary The Blues. It is also on the soundtrack of Scorsese's 2006 film The Departed and the 2017 movie American Made (in heavily edited form); it was previously used in the soundtracks of Almost Famous (2000), Dogtown and Z-Boys (2001), and Lords of Dogtown (2005). It is included in the Allmans compilations Dreams (1989), A Decade of Hits 1969-1979 (1991), and Gold (2005). Other concert performances of it are included on various retrospective live albums, such as Nassau Coliseum, Uniondale, NY: 5/1/73, which illustrates a rendition from the band's Chuck Leavell era.

== Bibliography ==
- Catalog of Copyright Entries: Music January–June 1965. Third. Vol. 19. Washington, D.C.: Library of Congress. 1967.
- Catalog of Copyright Entries: Music July–December 1965. Third. Vol. 19. Washington, D.C.: Library of Congress. 1967.
- Dahl, Bill (1996). "Sonny Boy Williamson [II] (album reviews)". In Erlewine, Michael; Bogdanov, Vladimir; Woodstra, Chris; Koda, Cub (eds.). All Music Guide to the Blues. San Francisco: Miller Freeman Books. ISBN 0-87930-424-3.
- Dixon, Willie (1965). The Real Folk Blues (Album notes). Sonny Boy Williamson II. Chicago: Chess Records. LP-1503.
- Dixon, Willie; Snowden, Don (1989). I Am the Blues. Da Capo Press. ISBN 0-306-80415-8.
- Herzhaft, Gerard (1992). "Blues Standards". Encyclopedia of the Blues. Fayetteville, Arkansas: University of Arkansas Press. ISBN 1-55728-252-8.
- Humphrey, Mark (1993). The Essential Sonny Boy Williamson (Album notes). Sonny Boy Williamson II. Universal City, California: MCA/Chess Records. CHD2-9343.
- Inaba, Mitsutoshi (2011). Willie Dixon: Preacher of the Blues. Scarecrow Press. ISBN 978-0-8108-6993-6.
- Morris, Chris; Haig, Diana (1992). Elmore James: King of the Slide Guitar (Box set booklet). Elmore James. Nashville, Tennessee: Capricorn Records. OCLC 26833148. 9 42006-2.
- Pruter, Robert (2006). "Crockett, G. L.; Four Brothers". In Komara, Edward (ed.). Encyclopedia of the Blues. New York City: Routledge. ISBN 978-0-415-92699-7.
- Romano, Will (2006). Big Boss Man: The Life and Music of Bluesman Jimmy Reed. San Francisco: Backbeat Books. ISBN 978-0-87930-878-0.
- Rubin, Dave (2008). R&B Guitar. Milwaukee, Wisconsin: Hal Leonard.
- Sokolow, Fred (1996). "One Way Out". Elmore James: Master of the Electric Slide Guitar. Milwaukee, Wisconsin: Hal Leonard. ISBN 978-1476801667.
- Topping, Ray (1993). Elmore James: The Classic Early Recordings 1951–1956 (Box set booklet). Elmore James. Virgin Records America/Flair Records. OCLC 719630825. 7243 8 39632 2 5.
- Whitburn, Joel (1988). Top R&B Singles 1942–1988. Menomonee Falls, Wisconsin: Record Research. ISBN 0-89820-068-7.
