= Sea level (disambiguation) =

Sea level is the altitude where the ocean meets the atmosphere. It is often short for mean sea level, the average height of the ocean.

Sea level can also refer to:

- Sea Level, North Carolina
- Sea Level (band), 1970s musical group
  - Sea Level (album)
- Sea Level, a 2011 Malaysian CG animated film known internationally as SeeFood
- Standard sea level, a set of conditions for physical calculations

== See also ==
- Below Sea Level, a 2008 film by Gianfranco Rosi (director)
