= Old Town, Lansing, Michigan =

Old Town
- Neighborhood
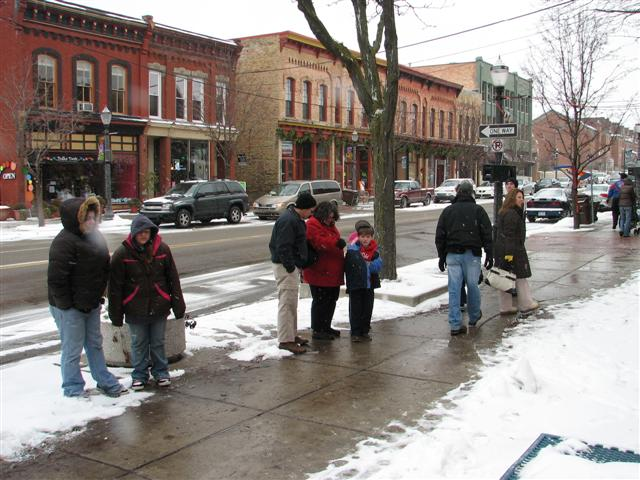
- Interactive map of Old Town
- Coordinates: 42.747427°N 84.549518°W
- Country: United States
- State: Michigan
- County: Ingham

Area
  - Total: 0.44 sq mi (1.1 km^{2})
- Elevation: 748 ft (228 m)

Population (2000)
  - Total: 1,654
  - Density: 3,708.5/sq mi (1,431.9/km^{2})
- Time zone: UTC-5 (EST)
  - Summer (DST): UTC-4 (EDT)
- ZIP codes: 48906
- Area code: 517
- FIPS code: 26-80700
- GNIS feature ID: 1615125
- Website: http://www.iloveoldtown.org/
- North Lansing Historic Commercial District
- U.S. National Register of Historic Places
- U.S. Historic district
- Michigan State Historic Site
- Location: E. Grand River Ave. and Turner St., Lansing, Michigan
- Area: 11 acres (4.5 ha)
- Architectural style: Late 19th And 20th Century Revivals, Late Victorian, Vernacular Commercial
- NRHP reference No.: 76001029 (original); 100006010 (increase)

Significant dates
- Added to NRHP: April 30, 1976
- Boundary increase: March 1, 2021
- Designated MSHS: June 18, 1976

Located in the northern end of Lansing, Michigan, Old Town overlooks the Grand River and a winding bike trail. Listed on the National Register of Historic Places as the North Lansing Historic Commercial District, the district was established in the mid-19th century.

== History ==
The first settler in North Lansing, later known as Lower Town and now Old Town, was John W. Burchard, an attorney from Mason. He built the first log cabin in Lansing in 1843 on land purchased from James Seymour. He built a dam across the Grand River later that year and hoped to build a mill, but drowned at the dam in 1844 while inspecting a break. A mill was built there later by James Seymour.

The North Lansing area grew when Lansing became the capital of Michigan in 1847, adding commercial and industrial businesses. By the 1870s, North Lansing was thriving. Franklin Street, now Grand River Avenue, was the "main street" of the commercial district, sporting banks, shops, groceries, churches, mills, a passenger and freight railroad station, manufacturing, and a sturdy middle class to support the commerce. By the mid-1900s, however, Upper Town and Middle Town were attracting more people and business; North Lansing lost its status as a commercial/industrial powerhouse.

The North Lansing Historic Commercial District, which included 44 buildings centered in a one-block radius around the intersection of Cesar E. Chavez (Grand River) Avenue and Turner Road, was added to the National Register of Historic Places in 1976. In 2021, the designated historic district was increased to include buildings located from 611 East-127 West Cesar E. Chavez Avenue, 1207-1250 Turner Street, 901-1135 North Washington Street, and along some adjacent streets.

In more recent years, the area now known as Old Town has sought to revitalize itself through programs like Michigan Main Street. This program was established in 1996 in Old Town, and between then and 2020, vacancy rates in the area dropped from 90% to 10%. Old Town has been re-invented as a location for art, festivals, boutique stores and creative businesses.

== Cultural events ==
Old Town hosts a number of annual cultural events, including:

- Old Town BluesFest: a two-day free blues music festival that happens every year in September.
- Lansing JazzFest: a two-day free jazz music festival that happens every year in August.
- Mighty Uke Day: a three-day event featuring the diminutive, yet dynamic ukulele.
- Scrapfest: an art festival that focuses on up-cycled and repurposed artwork where 10% of proceeds go to charity that happens every summer.
