= TreeHugger =

U.S.-based sustainability website

- Website type: Environmental Sustainability & News
- Owner: People Inc.
- Creator: Graham Hill
- Editor: Chuck Leavell (Editor at Large)
- Managing director: Molly Fergus
- Website: TreeHugger.com
- Launched: 2005
- Current status: active

TreeHugger is a sustainability website that reports on news, and other subjects like eco-friendly design, homes, and gardens. It was rated the top sustainability blog of 2007 by Nielsen Netratings, and was included in Time Magazine's 2008 blog index as one of the top twenty-five blogs. The website claims to have "over 100 expert writers."

== History ==
TreeHugger was acquired by Discovery Communications on August 1, 2007, for $10 million.

In 2012, Mother Nature Network, founded by Joel Babbit and Chuck Leavell (now Narrative Content Group) acquired TreeHugger.

In 2020, Dotdash acquired TreeHugger and Mother Nature Network.

TreeHugger has an annual award program known as "Best of Green Awards" for the best green initiatives within various sectors and categories.

== See also ==
- Conservation movement
- Ecology movement
- Environmentalism
