= Jimmy Nalls =

American jazz musician (1951–2017)

Jimmy Nalls (born James Albert Nalls III; May 31, 1951 – June 22, 2017) was an American guitarist mostly known as a founding member of the rock band Sea Level.

== Biography ==
Born on May 31, 1951, in Washington D.C., Nalls embarked on a busy session career in the early 1970s, joining singer/songwriter Alex Taylor’s band while Taylor was a Capricorn Records label mate of the Allman Brothers'. It was during this period that Nalls first worked with future Allmans keyboardist Chuck Leavell, an association that would prove fruitful for both musicians after the Allmans' 1976 split.

Alongside fellow Allmans vets Lamar Williams and Jaimoe, Leavell decided to start a new group after the Allman Brothers Band folded, enlisting Nalls for the band he had dubbed Sea Level — a play on C. Leavell. While they never achieved the same level of commercial success as the Allmans, they toured and recorded steadily over the next five years, completing five albums before folding in 1981.

Following Sea Level's breakup, Nalls performed with a number of acts, spending a period as a Nashville session player in the 1980s and working with artists such as Bodyworks and B.J. Thomas. He started the 1990s by joining singer T. Graham Brown's touring band, and remained in the lineup until shortly after receiving his Parkinson’s diagnosis in 1994.

While his symptoms made it difficult to continue performing, Nalls kept playing, releasing the solo album Ain't No Stranger in 1999. He released a follow-up album – The Jimmy Nalls Project – just two days before his death. It features several guest stars including Brad Whitford, Joe Bonamassa, Robben Ford, Warren Haynes, Larry Carlton and Chuck Leavell.

== Death ==
Nalls died on June 22, 2017, from complications of Parkinson's disease. He was 66.
