= Root Doctor =

Michigan-based blues and soul band

- Origin: Michigan, United States
- Genres: Blues
- Labels: Rocket 88, Big O Records, RD Records
- Members: Freddie Cunningham; Bobby Gardner; Bill Malone; Mike Skory; James Williams
- Website: www.rootdoctorband.com

Root Doctor is a Michigan-based blues and soul band who have released half a dozen albums to date. There have been personnel changes over the years but James Williams and Freddie Cunningham have remained consistent.

== Origin and background ==
The music the group plays is a mixture of classic soul and traditional blues. A good portion of their material are original compositions.

The group started out as the Downtown Blues Band in 1989. They changed their name to Root Doctor as there was another group around called The Uptown Band and they wanted to avoid any confusion. Their name comes from the song "Root Doctor" which was recorded by Buddy Ace. Two of the founding members were Freddie Cunningham and James Williams. Cunningham was born in Mississippi and moved to the Lansing area as a young boy. In those years it was a hard time for blues singers as Motown was the in thing. Williams is the brother of Lamar Williams who was the bass player in The Allman Brothers and Sea Level.

== Career ==
By 2005, the group was in its 16th year of the group's existence. Freddie Cunningham and James Williams had been there right from the beginning. That year Greg Nagy was asked to join the group. He had been playing in bands since he dropped out of graduate school in 1993. At the time he was a stay at home father of two and wasn't looking at joining another group. But Root Doctor asked him to join and he did so on the proviso that they record an album of original material. The timing was right because this is what the group had been thinking about doing.

In 2006, their album Been a Long Time Coming was released on the Big O Records label. Living Blues magazine said it was a beautifully executed project.

By July 2007, the group consisted of Freddie Cunningham, Rick Bole, Greg Nagy, James Williams, and Jim Alfredson.

In 2009, following a difficult decision to leave Root Doctor, guitarist Greg Nagy left the group to pursue a solo career. He released his solo album Walk That Fine Thin Line in May that year which earned him a nomination from the national Blues Foundation for best new artist. Also that year, the group appeared in one of the episodes of Backstage Pass.

In 2011, their album Joy was released. It featured guest musicians such as Lisa Smith, Jamison (Jamo), and Lamar Williams Jr. For the release of their album, they had a Blues Cruise CD release party on the Michigan Princess on October 15 and a week later on the 22, they had one at the Green Door Blues Bar and Grill.

In 2013, their album Attitude was released. Other musicians to pay on the album were Dave Matchette on harmonica, Mike Lynch on accordion, Andy Wilson on trumpet, Len'i Glenn on baritone saxophone, Jerrick Matthews on trombone, Chad Bement on tenor saxophone, Michael Dease on trombone, and R. Gardner on washboard. The tracks included "Rear View Sight", "Set Me Free ", "Bring It Back", "You're Gonna Lose " and "Land Of The Free ". Also that year they were one of the acts to appear at the second annual Blues, Brews & Barbecue event, held at Birch Run Township which ran from August 22 to August 25.

In 2014, they were playing at the Michigan BluesFest, an event that runs on a Friday and Saturday in September. Other artists at the event included Big Boss Blues Band, Harper & Midwest Kind, Greg Nagy, Mike Morgan with Hank Mowery & the Hawktones, and the Marci Linn Band.

== Members ==
- Jim Alfredson ... keyboards
- Rick Bole ... drums
- Freddie Cunningham ... lead vocals
- Bobby Gardner ... drums and vocals
- Bill Malone ... guitar and vocals
- Greg Nagy ... guitar
- Mike Skory ... Hammond organ, keyboards, vocals
- James Williams ... bass and vocals

== Discography ==
Albums
Title	Release info	Year	Notes
The Doctor Is In	Rocket 88 #17	1997	
Been a Long Time Coming	Big O Records 2406	2006	
Change Our Ways	Big O Records 2407	2007	
Live at the Cadillac Club	Big O Records 2409	2008	
Joy	RD Records 59515	2011	
New Attitude	CD Baby 19967	2013	

Compilation albums
Title	Release info	Year	Notes
Cadillac Blues		2007	
