= Mother Nature Network =

News and information website

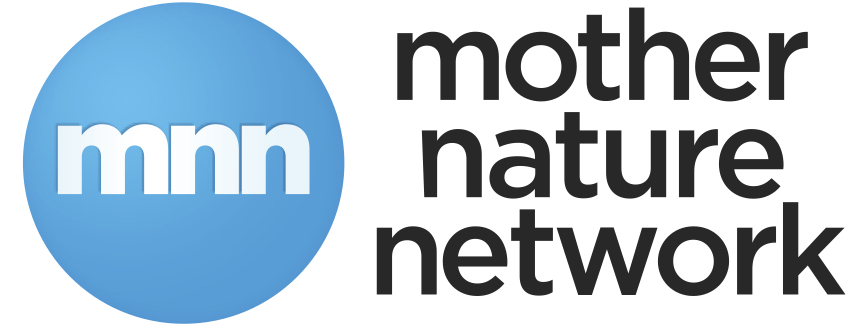
- Website type: News and information related to sustainability and responsible living
- Available in: English
- Headquarters: Atlanta
- Creators: Joel Babbit & Chuck Leavell
- Industry: Media
- Website: mnn.com
- Launched: 2009
- Current status: Active

Mother Nature Network (mnn.com) was a news and information website focused on sustainability and ranked by Alexa Internet as the most visited for-profit website in the world in its environmental category. It was labeled "the green CNN" by Time magazine, "green machine" by the Associated Press, and "best of the breed" by Fast Company. Founded in 2009 by former marketing executive Joel Babbit and Rolling Stones keyboardist Chuck Leavell, it was the flagship property of Narrative Content Group, whose equity partners included CNN and Discovery Inc.

MNN generated revenue via exclusive content category sponsorships versus the traditional advertising model utilized by most websites. Brand partners included Walmart, Mercedes-Benz, AT&T, Johnson & Johnson, Coca-Cola, UPS, Allstate, Dell, Subway, MillerCoors, Bayer, Dunkin' Brands, and many other leading corporations. In February 2020, Narrative sold Mother Nature Network and TreeHugger, another of its sustainability focused websites acquired from Discovery, to digital media company Dotdash, an operating business of IAC (NASDAQ: IAC). The two sites were then merged and operate under the Treehugger name.

== Content ==
It covered a wide range of topics beyond traditional "green" issues – including family, pets, travel, health, home, and food.

== Board of directors and advisors ==
- Joel Babbit, CEO of Narrative Content Group and Mother Nature Network
- Thomas Bell Jr., Chairman of Mesa Capital Partners (former Chairman and CEO of Young & Rubicam and Chairman of U.S. Chamber of Commerce)
- Gerald Benjamin, Co-founder and Managing Partner of Atlanta Equity (former Vice Chairman of GreenSky)
- A.D. "Pete" Correll, Co-founder and Chairman of Atlanta Equity (former Chairman and CEO of Georgia-Pacific Corporation)
- Doug Hertz, CEO of United Distributors Inc. and Partner in the Atlanta Falcons
- Chuck Leavell, Keyboardist for the Rolling Stones
- James D. Robinson III, Co-founder and General Partner of RRE Ventures, LLC (former Chairman and CEO of American Express)
- Fred Seegal, Vice Chairman of Peter J. Solomon Company (former President of Wasserstein Perella)

== Nonprofit partners ==
MNN worked with a wide range of nonprofit organizations, including:

- American Farmland Trust
- Captain Planet Foundation
- Nature Conservancy
- National Wildlife Federation
- Newman's Own Foundation
- UCLA Institute of the Environment and Sustainability
- White House Correspondents' Association
