= Nassau Coliseum, Uniondale, NY: 5/1/73 =

Live album by The Allman Brothers Band
- Released: 2005
- Recorded: May 1, 1973
- Venue: Nassau Coliseum; Uniondale, New York
- Genre: Southern rock, blues rock
- Length: 156:00
- Label: The Allman Brothers Band Recording Company
- Producer: The Allman Brothers Band

The Allman Brothers Band chronology
| Macon City Auditorium: 2/11/72 (2004) | Nassau Coliseum, Uniondale, NY: 5/1/73 (2005) | Gold (2005) |

Nassau Coliseum: Uniondale, NY: 5/1/73 is a two-CD live album by the Allman Brothers Band. It was recorded at Nassau Coliseum in Uniondale, New York on May 1, 1973. The fourth archival concert release from the Allman Brothers Band Recording Company, it features the 1972 to 1976 lineup of the band – Gregg Allman (organ, guitar, vocals), Dickey Betts (guitar, vocals), Chuck Leavell (piano), Lamar Williams (bass), Jaimoe (drums), and Butch Trucks (drums). It was released in 2005.

== Critical reception ==
Professional ratings
Review scores
| Source | Rating |
|---|---|
| AllMusic | 3.5/5 stars |
| All About Jazz | 4.5/5 stars |

On AllMusic William Rhulmann said, "The obvious difference between this lineup and the previous ones was in the changed arrangements due to the different instrumentation. Leavell covered for Gregg Allman on keyboards when he picked up a guitar, as on "Wasted Words", but much of the time this version of the Allmans was a two-keyboard/one-guitar unit rather than the two-guitar/one-keyboard configuration of Duane Allman's time.... Guitarist Dickey Betts had turned to slide work in emulation of Duane Allman, and he was highly proficient, but the twin-guitar lines of old were gone, and the improvisational sections took a jazzier turn."

In All About Jazz Doug Collette wrote, "Gregg's laid-back "Wasted Words" features Dickey Betts playing slide: rather than make any attempt to match the reckless abandon of the late Duane Allman's style, his leisurely approach sounds like nothing so much as the country-blues instrument, the dobro.... Brought into the band after playing on Gregg's solo album, Leavell transformed the sound of ABB in a number of ways with his versatile playing and improvisational ingenuity.... The rhythm section, however, may be the real star of Nassau 5-1-73."

== Track listing ==
Disc one

1. "Wasted Words" (Gregg Allman) - 4:58
2. "Done Somebody Wrong" (Elmore James, Clarence Lewis, Bobby Robinson) - 3:52
3. "Statesboro Blues" (Blind Willie McTell) - 4:15
4. "One Way Out" (Elmore James, Marshall Sehorn, Sonny Boy Williamson II) - 7:42
5. "Stormy Monday" (T-Bone Walker) - 8:46
6. "Midnight Rider" (Gregg Allman, Robert Payne) - 3:13
7. "Jessica" (Dickey Betts) - 10:25
8. "Come & Go Blues" (Gregg Allman) - 4:58
9. "Ramblin' Man" (Dickey Betts) - 7:53
10. "In Memory of Elizabeth Reed" (Dickey Betts) - 15:06

Disc two

1. "Trouble No More" (McKinley Morganfield) - 4:02
2. "You Don't Love Me" (Willie Cobbs) - 6:19
3. "Les Brers In A Minor" (Dickey Betts) - 19:12
4. "Whipping Post" (Gregg Allman) - 18:40
5. "Mountain Jam" (Donovan Leitch, Duane Allman, Gregg Allman, Dickey Betts, Berry Oakley, Butch Trucks, Jai Johanny Johanson) - 31:05

== Personnel ==
Allman Brothers Band

- Gregg Allman – vocals, Hammond B3 organ
- Dickey Betts – lead and slide guitars, vocals
- Jaimoe – drums, percussion
- Butch Trucks – drums, tympani
- Chuck Leavell – keyboards
- Lamar Williams – bass guitar

Production

- Recording produced by the Allman Brothers Band
- Package produced by Kirk West, Bert Holman
- Live mixing: Mike Callahan
- Mastering, engineering: Skip Littlewood
- Package design: Jeff Faith
- Liner notes: John Lynskey
