= Duke Jupiter =

American rock band

- Origin: Rochester, New York
- Genre: Rock
- Years active: 1973–1986

Duke Jupiter was an American rock band from Rochester, New York. They were active in the 1970s and 1980s on Mercury Records, CBS Records, and the Motown subsidiaries Morocco Records and Powerglide Records. They are best known for their hit single "I'll Drink to You".

After the release of their first album Sweet Cheeks in 1978, Duke Jupiter started touring with national acts, including ZZ Top, Stevie Ray Vaughan, David Bowie, Bob Seger, Robert Palmer, B. B. King, Toto, Sea Level, Huey Lewis and the News, REO Speedwagon, Foreigner, Blue Öyster Cult, The Charlie Daniels Band, Outlaws, and John Lee Hooker.

== History ==
George Barajas died of a brain tumor in August 1982.

In June 1982, the band played a free concert in Rochester and 25,000 fans attended. The concert was held at Ontario Beach Park and caused the biggest traffic jam the city had seen. The concert ended up making national news as well as MTV.

Because of their rising popularity, the band went on to tour with REO Speedwagon, ZZ TOP, Foreigner, Blue Oyster Cult, and David Bowie.

Duke Jupiter played a farewell concert in their hometown of Rochester in 1986. This ended a 13-year career for the band.

From 1973 to 1986, Duke Jupiter released nine albums with four music videos that appeared on MTV.

In 2014, Duke Jupiter was inducted into the Rochester Hall of Fame.

David Corcoran (born in Smithtown, New York) died of kidney cancer on June 21, 2018, at age 64.

== Original band members ==
- Marshall Styler - Lead vocals, keyboards
- Greg Walker - Lead vocals, Guitar
- Don Maracle - Guitar
- George Barajas - Bass guitar, background vocals, all recordings through portions of Duke Jupiter I
- Earl Jetty - Drums, Sweet Cheeks
- David Hanlon - Drums, Taste The Night and Band In Blue

== 1980 to present band members ==
- Marshall James Styler - Keyboards, lead vocals
- Greg Walker - Guitar, lead vocals
- Rickey Ellis - Bass guitar, vocals
- Dave Corcoran - Drums, Lead vocals

== Discography ==
=== Albums ===
Studio Albums

| Year | Title | Peak Positions | Album Notes |
| Year | Title | US | Album Notes |
|---|---|---|---|
| 1978 | Sweet Cheeks | - | Mercury SRM-1-3718; Produced by Chuck Leavell |
| 1979 | Taste The Night | - | Mercury SRM-1-3756; Produced by Glen Kolotkin |
| 1980 | Band In Blue | - | Mercury SRM-1-3815; Produced by Steve Katz |
| 1980 | Begin Again - Collector's Edition [EP] | - | See footnotes |
| 1982 | Duke Jupiter I | 204 | Coast To Coast Records (US); Epic Records (Canada); Some pressings show a "Roadshow" logo Produced by Glen Kolotkin |
| 1983 | You Make It Look Easy | - | Coast To Coast Records; Produced by Ashley Howe |
| 1984 | White Knuckle Ride | 122 | Morocco Records; Produced by Glen Kolotkin |
| 1985 | The Line Of Your Fire | - | Motown Records; Produced by Glen Kolotkin |

Live albums

- Duke Jupiter/The Restless Concert (1984)
- Captured Live! (1984)
- Duke Jupiter Live in Concert 1984 (2012) Duke Jupiter records

=== Singles ===
| Year | Title | Peak Positions | | Album |
| Year | Title | US | US Rock | Album |
|---|---|---|---|---|
| 1978 | "Trouble In Paradise/Days Between Us" | - | - | Sweet Cheeks |
| 1979 | "Taste The Night" | - | - | Taste The Night |
| 1979 | "Like Our First Night" | - | - | Taste The Night |
| 1980 | "If You Love Her" | - | - | Band In Blue |
| 1982 | "I'll Drink To You" | 58 | 16 | Duke Jupiter I |
| 1982 | "Rock 'N' Roll Band" | - | - | Duke Jupiter I |
| 1982 | "Rockin' In A Motel Room" | - | - | Duke Jupiter I |
| 1983 | "You Make It Look Easy" | - | – | You Make It Look Easy |
| 1984 | "Little Lady" | 68 | 12 | White Knuckle Ride |
| 1984 | "Rescue Me" | 101 | - | White Knuckle Ride |
| 1985 | "The Line Of Your Fire" | - | - | The Line Of Your Fire |
