= Gold (Allman Brothers Band album) =

Greatest hits album by the Allman Brothers Band
- Released: 2005
- Recorded: 1969–1979
- Genre: Blues rock Southern rock Jazz fusion Instrumental rock Hard rock
- Length: 152:08
- Label: Mercury Records

The Allman Brothers Band chronology
Nassau Coliseum, Uniondale, NY: 5/1/73 (2005)	Gold (2005)	Boston Common, 8/17/71 (2007)

Professional ratings
Review scores
Source	Rating
AllMusic	3.5/5 stars

Gold is a two-CD compilation album by the Allman Brothers Band. It contains songs selected from their first eight albums, which were released by Capricorn Records — The Allman Brothers Band (1969), Idlewild South (1970), At Fillmore East (1971), Eat a Peach (1972), Brothers and Sisters (1973), Win, Lose or Draw (1975), Wipe the Windows, Check the Oil, Dollar Gas (1976), and Enlightened Rogues (1979). It was released by Island Records on October 11, 2005. It is a reissue of the 2001 expanded compilation The Road Goes On Forever: A Collection of Their Greatest Recordings.

== Track listing ==
=== Disc one ===
1. "Don't Want You No More" (Spencer Davis, Edward Hardin) – 2:25
2. "It's Not My Cross to Bear" (Gregg Allman) – 4:55
3. "Black Hearted Woman" (Gregg Allman) – 5:18
4. "Trouble No More" (McKinley Morganfield a.k.a. Muddy Waters) – 3:48
5. "Dreams" (Gregg Allman) – 7:19
6. "Whipping Post" (Gregg Allman) – 5:19
7. "Revival" (Dickey Betts) – 4:05
8. "Midnight Rider" (Gregg Allman, Robert Payne) – 2:59
9. "Don't Keep Me Wonderin'" (Gregg Allman) – 3:29
10. "Hoochie Coochie Man" (Willie Dixon) – 4:59
11. "Statesboro Blues" (Live) (Blind Willie McTell) – 4:20
12. "Stormy Monday" (Live) (T–Bone Walker) – 8:48
13. "Hot 'Lanta" (Live) (Duane Allman, Gregg Allman, Dickey Betts, Berry Oakley, Butch Trucks, Jai Johanny Johanson) – 5:19
14. "In Memory of Elizabeth Reed" (Live) (Dickey Betts) – 13:05

=== Disc two ===
1. "One Way Out (Live) (Elmore James, Marshall Sehorn, Sonny Boy Williamson II) – 4:59
2. "Ain't Wastin' Time No More" (Gregg Allman) – 3:40
3. "Melissa" (Gregg Allman, Steve Alaimo) – 3:56
4. "Stand Back" (Gregg Allman, Berry Oakley) – 3:24
5. "Blue Sky" (Dickey Betts) – 5:10
6. "Little Martha" (Duane Allman) – 2:10
7. "Wasted Words" (Gregg Allman) – 4:20
8. "Ramblin' Man" (Dickey Betts) – 4:49
9. "Southbound" (Dickey Betts) – 5:09
10. "Jessica" (Dickey Betts) – 7:30
11. "Come and Go Blues" (Live) (Gregg Allman) – 5:06
12. "Can't Lose What You Never Had" (McKinley Morganfield a.k.a. Muddy Waters) – 5:50
13. "Win, Lose or Draw" (Gregg Allman) – 4:44
14. "Crazy Love" (Dickey Betts) – 3:43
15. "Can't Take It With You" (Dickey Betts, Don Johnson) – 3:33
16. "Pegasus" (Dickey Betts) – 7:31
- Disc 1, tracks 1–6 from The Allman Brothers Band (1969)
- Disc 1, tracks 7–10 from Idlewild South (1970)
- Disc 1, tracks 11–14 from At Fillmore East (1971)
- Disc 2, tracks 1–6 from Eat a Peach (1972)
- Disc 2, tracks 7–10 from Brothers and Sisters (1973)
- Disc 2, track 11 from Wipe the Windows, Check the Oil, Dollar Gas (1976)
- Disc 2, tracks 12–13 from Win, Lose or Draw (1975)
- Disc 2, tracks 14–16 from Enlightened Rogues (1979)

==== Live songs ====
- Disc 1, tracks 11–14 recorded 3/1971 at the Fillmore East in New York, NY
- Disc 2, track 1 recorded 6/27/1971 at the Fillmore East in New York, NY
- Disc 2, track 11 recorded 7/28/1973 at the Racecourse in Watkins Glen, NY

== Charts ==
Chart performance for Gold
Chart (2025)	Peak position
Greek Albums (IFPI)	28
