= Lansing JazzFest =

- Status: active
- Genre: music festivals
- Frequency: Annually
- Location: Lansing, Michigan
- Coordinates: 42°44′1″N 84°32′48″W
- Country: United States

The Lansing JazzFest is a free music festival that takes place each year in the summer in Lansing, Michigan. It showcases nationally, regionally, and locally known jazz artists such as Marcus Belgrave, the Professors of Jazz at MSU (Rodney Whitaker, Randy Gelispie, Diego Rivera, Derrick Gardner, Sunny Wilkinson, and Rick Roe), Eric Reed, Michael Kaeshammer, Straight Ahead, Don Phillips, Lisa Smith and Mike Skory, Sunrise II, Jazz Doggs, Tyrone Johnson, the Claudia Schmidt Quartet, Dick Fizzell & the Dixieland Express, Tim Cunningham, Francis Kofi, Betty Joplin, Sheila Landis, Ritmo, Patti Richards, Los Gatos, and more.

The festival welcomes nearly 15,000 attendees over the weekend.

== History ==
The Lansing JazzFest began in 1995 when the Old Town Business and Art Development Association, having successfully produced OctoberFest (now the Old Town BluesFest), discovered that music festivals are an excellent way to encourage people to visit and enjoy Old Town Lansing. The local jazz radio station, 89.7 WLNZ, signed on as a founding media sponsor, and Message Makers, a local media company, became its founding business sponsor. In the festival's early days, local musicians donated their time to play at JazzFest, and volunteers from the local community pitched in to see that the 4,000-5,000 people in attendance had a good time. The Lansing JazzFest is the only mid-Michigan festival to increase consistently in attendance every year since its beginning.

A virtual show was planned in September 2020 as live shows were cancelled caused by the COVID-19 pandemic.

== See also ==
- Detroit International Jazz Festival
