= Joel Babbit =

American entrepreneur

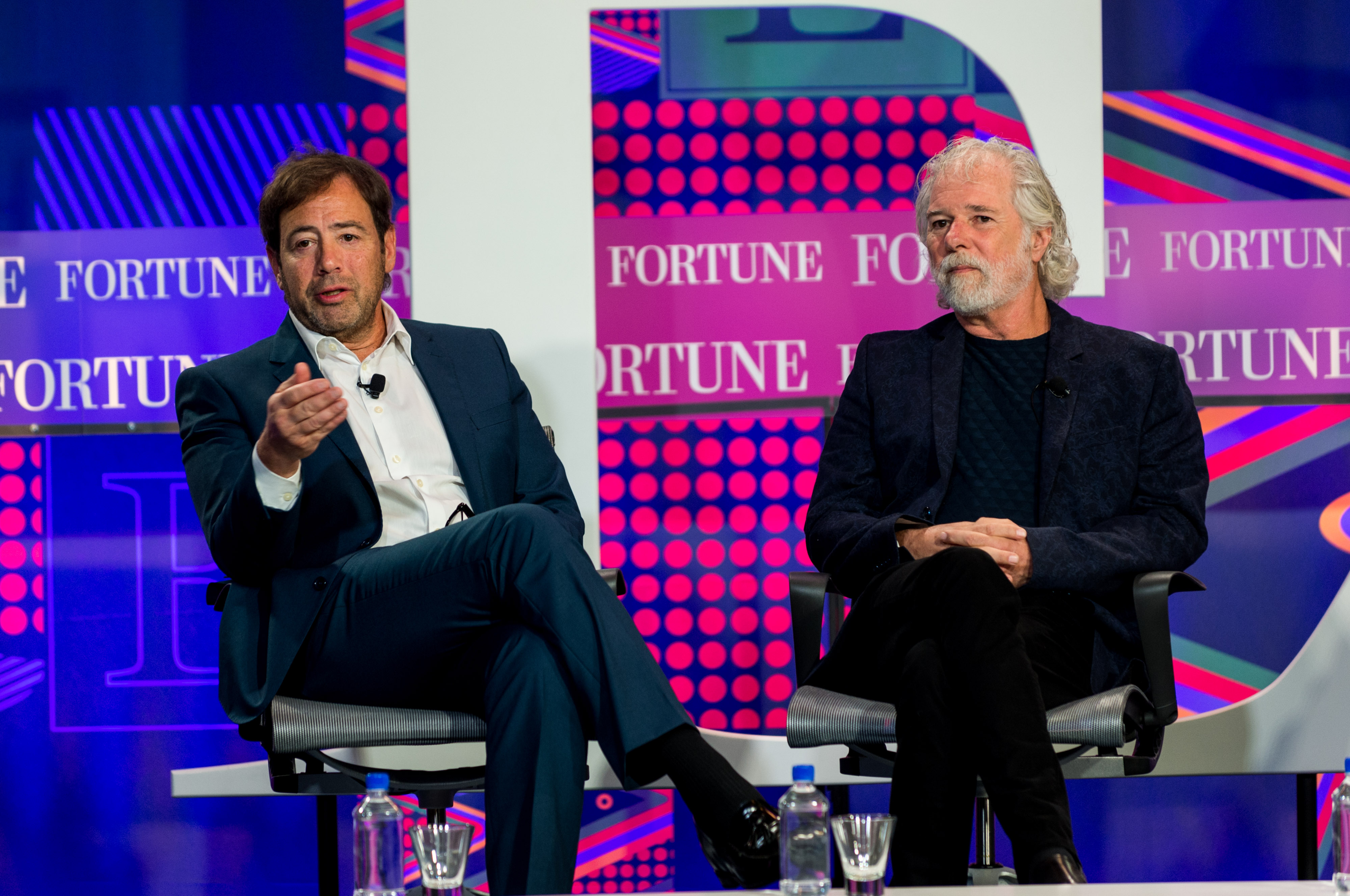
- Babbit (left) and Chuck Leavell in 2015
- Born: 11 August 1953 (age 73); Atlanta, Georgia, US
- Occupations: Marketing Executive, Entrepreneur
- Website: https://narrativecontent.com

Joel Babbit (born August 11, 1953) is an American marketing executive and entrepreneur. He is CEO of Narrative Content Group, which he co-founded in 2009 with Rolling Stones keyboardist Chuck Leavell.

== Early life and education ==
Babbit was born in Atlanta, Georgia. He attended the University of Georgia, graduating in 1976 with a degree in advertising. He received the university's John Holliman Lifetime Achievement Award in 2015.

== Career ==
The majority of Babbit's career has been spent in the advertising agency business, working with clients including AT&T, The Coca-Cola Company, Dell, Home Depot, RJR Nabisco and United Parcel Service.

Babbit began working at McCann Erickson in 1978, and would later be executive vice president of Chiat/Day and president of WPP's GCI Group. He co-founded Babbit & Reiman Advertising with business partner Joey Reiman, and was CEO while it became one of the largest advertising agencies in the U.S. Southeast. In 1988, it was acquired by London-based Gold Greenlees Trott. Babbit also co-founded 360, a marketing firm later acquired by WPP's Grey Global Group.

Babbit has been profiled by a variety of national and international media outlets, including Forbes, Advertising Age, Fortune, The New York Times, Financial Times, and The Wall Street Journal.

== Narrative Content Group ==
Babbit is CEO of Narrative Content Group. Founded in 2009 by Babbit and Leavell, its equity partners include CNN and Discovery Communications. The company creates, publishes and distributes content for brands that have included Aflac, AT&T, Bacardi, The Coca-Cola Company, Delta Air Lines, Georgia-Pacific and Mercedes-Benz.

Narrative owned TreeHugger and Mother Nature Network, the company's flagship property, which was ranked by Alexa Internet as the most visited for-profit website in the world in its environmental category.

Through MNN, and in partnership with Southern Company, Babbit and Leavell also created and produced the White House Correspondents' Jam, which was held annually in Washington, D.C.

In February of 2020, Narrative sold Treehugger and Mother Nature Network to digital media company DotDash, an operating business of IAC (NASDAQ: IAC).

== Civic involvement ==
Following Atlanta’s selection to host the 1996 Summer Olympics, Babbit took a leave of absence from the private sector and was appointed by Mayor Maynard Jackson to be the city’s first chief marketing and communications officer. He also was a member of the mayor's cabinet.

Babbit has done pro bono work for organizations such as the Centers for Disease Control and Prevention, the King Center for Nonviolent Social Change, United Way of America, Boys & Girls Club and the United Nations Foundation. He wrote and produced a 2015 public service video about road rage starring former professional boxer Evander Holyfield, which has been viewed more than 32 million times on YouTube (as of February 2022).

Babbit has been active in civic and non-profit organizations, including the Young Presidents' Organization, the CDC Foundation, the Atlanta History Center and the United Way. He is a director of Primerica (NYSE: PRI) and GreenSky (NASDAQ: GSKY).
