= Cats on the Coast =

Studio album by Sea Level
- Released: 1977
- Recorded: Capricorn Sound Studios, Macon, GA
- Length: 38:12
- Label: Capricorn
- Producer: Stewart Levine

Sea Level chronology
Sea Level (1977)	Cats on the Coast (1977)	On the Edge (1978)

Cats on the Coast is the second album by American rock band Sea Level. It was released in 1977 on Capricorn Records.

The leadoff track, "That's Your Secret", reached #50 on the Billboard Hot 100, the band's only charting single.

== Reception ==
Professional ratings
Review scores
Source	Rating
AllMusic	4/5 stars
Christgau's Record Guide	B−

In a review for AllMusic, Dave Lynch wrote: "Some great music from Sea Level was still to come, but the best moments of Cats on the Coast wouldn't be topped."

Exposé's Peter Thelen stated that, with the album, "there... seemed to be a new emphasis on the vocal material, which seemed to be changing from a country funk sound into more of a funky white soul a la Boz Scaggs. Only four instrumentals this time out, one under two minutes, but still the high point of the album, especially the title track."

== Track listing ==
=== Side one ===
1. "That's Your Secret" (Randall Bramblett, Davis Causey) – 5:15
2. "It Hurts to Want It So Bad" (Charles Feldman, Tim Smith, Steve Smith) – 3:38
3. "Storm Warning" (Chuck Leavell) – 5:23
4. "Had to Fall" (Randall Bramblett, Jimmy Nalls, Lamar Williams) – 4:35

=== Side two ===
1. "Midnight Pass" (Neil Larsen) – 6:30
2. "Every Little Thing" (Randall Bramblett) – 4:40
3. "Cats on the Coast" (Davis Causey) – 5:38
4. "Song for Amy" (Chuck Leavell) – 1:40

== Charts ==
Chart (1978)	Peak position
Australia (Kent Music Report)	99

== Personnel ==
- Randall Bramblett – lead vocals (tracks 1, 4, 6), piano (track 1, 6), organ (tracks 2, 3), backing vocals (tracks 2, 4), soprano saxophone (tracks 3, 6, 7), alto saxophone (track 5), percussion (track 5)
- Davis Causey – electric guitar (tracks 1–7), backing vocals (track 2)
- Jai Johanny Johanson – congas (tracks 1, 3, 7)
- Chuck Leavell – piano (tracks 1, 3, 4, 5, 7, 8), percussion (tracks 1, 3, 5, 6), organ (tracks 1, 6), harmony vocals (tracks 1, 6), electric piano (tracks 2, 3, 5), ARP Odyssey (track 3), clavinet (track 7), lead vocals (tracks 2, 4), backing vocals (track 4)
- Jimmy Nalls – electric guitar (tracks 1–6), backing vocals (tracks 2, 4), acoustic guitar (tracks 4, 6), slide guitar (tracks 4, 7)
- George Weaver – drums (tracks 1–7)
- Lamar Williams – bass (tracks 1–7), backing vocals (tracks 2, 4)

Technical

- Stewart Levine – producer
- Rik Pekkonen – engineer
- David Pinkston – engineer
