= Byther Smith =

American blues musician (1932–2021)

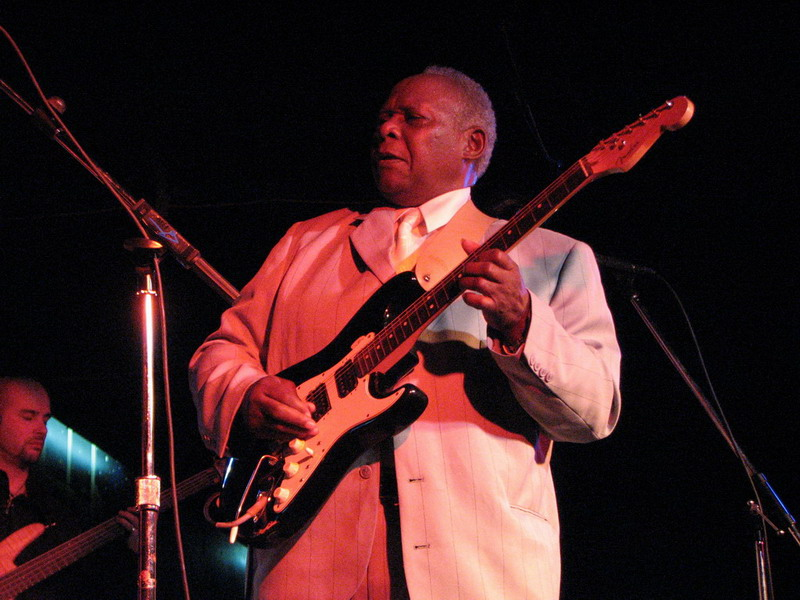
- Smith at the Silver Dollar Room, Toronto, 2008

Background information
- Also known as: Byther Smith, Byther Smitty Smith
- Born: Byther Claude Earl John Smith; April 17, 1932; Monticello, Mississippi, U.S.
- Died: September 10, 2021 (aged 89) Chicago, Illinois, U.S.
- Genres: Blues, electric blues
- Occupation: Musician
- Instruments: Guitar, vocals
- Years active: Late 1950s–2021
- Labels: Delmark, Bullseye, Black and Tan

Byther Claude Earl John Smith (April 17, 1932 – September 10, 2021) was an American blues musician who worked with Muddy Waters, Howlin’ Wolf, Jimmy Reed, Otis Rush and Junior Wells.

== Biography ==
=== Early life ===
Born in Monticello, Mississippi, United States, Smith's early music experiences revolved around gospel music. Orphaned, Smith was brought up by his uncle and aunt. In his teenage years he moved to Arizona to work on a cattle ranch and played in a country and western band on weekends. He worked in construction and local farmhands taught him to play the double bass. Around this time Smith showed an interest in boxing, so his aunt bought Smith an electric bass guitar to encourage him to follow a musical path instead.

=== Career ===
Smith migrated to Chicago in the mid-1950s with his wife, Etta Mae. In the early 1960s he began performing in clubs, learning guitar from J. B. Lenoir (his first cousin who had encouraged him to migrate), Robert Lockwood, Jr., and Hubert Sumlin. He worked regularly as rhythm guitarist for Otis Rush. During this period he recorded a number of singles with labels such as Bea & Baby, Cruise and Apex but in 1965 returned to his gospel roots with a group called the Gospel Travellers. In the 1970s he joined the house band at Theresa’s Tavern where he worked for five years, often playing with Junior Wells. In 1974 he recorded various tracks with Sunnyland Slim for Slim's later album She Got A Thing Goin' On. In the late 1970s, Smith toured with the likes of Big Mama Thornton and George "Harmonica" Smith.

After years playing in clubs all over the world, a demo tape Smith recorded became the album Tell Me How You Like It, released by the Texas-based Grits record label. His next release in the United Kingdom was Addressing the Nation with the Blues for JSP Records. In 1995, Smith retired from his job at Economy Folding Box Company after twenty-five years, allowing him to focus fully on music. Smith retired from touring in 2015.

Delmark Records boss Bob Koester observed, "There's a mellowness there that is disappearing in all but B.B. King".

Byther Smith died in Chicago on September 10, 2021, aged 89.

== Discography ==
=== Singles ===
- "Thanks You Mr. Kennedy" / "Champion Girl" (EDA Records 1556, 1962)
- "Give Me My White Robe, Pt. 1" / "Give Me My White Robe, Pt. 2" (C.J. Records 659, 1972)
- "Money Tree" / "So Unhappy" (Be Be Records 101, 1974)
- "What Have I Done" / "Sweet Sixteen" (Be Be Records 102, 1976)
- "Tell Me How You Like It" / "Come On In This House" (Grits Records 4500, 1983)

=== Albums ===
- Tell Me How You Like It [recorded 1981] (Grits Records 100, 1983)
- Big Shot Smitty (Mina [jp] Records 1002, 1984)
- Gritty Soul (Mina [jp] Records 1004, 1985)
- Addressing the Nation with the Blues (JSP Records 232, 1989)
- Housefire (Bullseye Blues/Rounder 9503, 1991) [CD reissue of Mina #1004]
- I'm a Mad Man (Bullseye Blues/Rounder 9527, 1993)
- Mississippi Kid (Delmark 691, 1996)
- All Night Long (Delmark 708, 1997)
- Smitty's Blues (Black and Tan 008 , 2001)
- Throw Away the Book (Black and Tan 017, 2003)
- Hold That Train (Delmark 774, 2004) [CD reissue of Grits #100, plus 4 tracks from Mina #1002, and 1 previously unreleased track]
- Got No Place to Go (Fedora/HighNote 5034, 2008)
- Blues on the Moon: Live at Natural Rhythm Social Club (Delmark 796, 2008)
- Working Man's Blues (JSP Records 2510, 2022) 2-CD; reissue of Addressing the Nation with the Blues with one bonus track (disc 1), plus all five of Smith's early 45rpm singles, and six live tracks from a 1990 Belgium concert (disc 2).

== See also ==
- List of Chicago blues musicians
- Old Town BluesFest
