= Detroit Jazz Festival =

Music festival

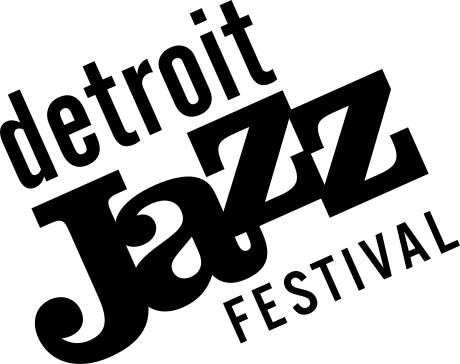

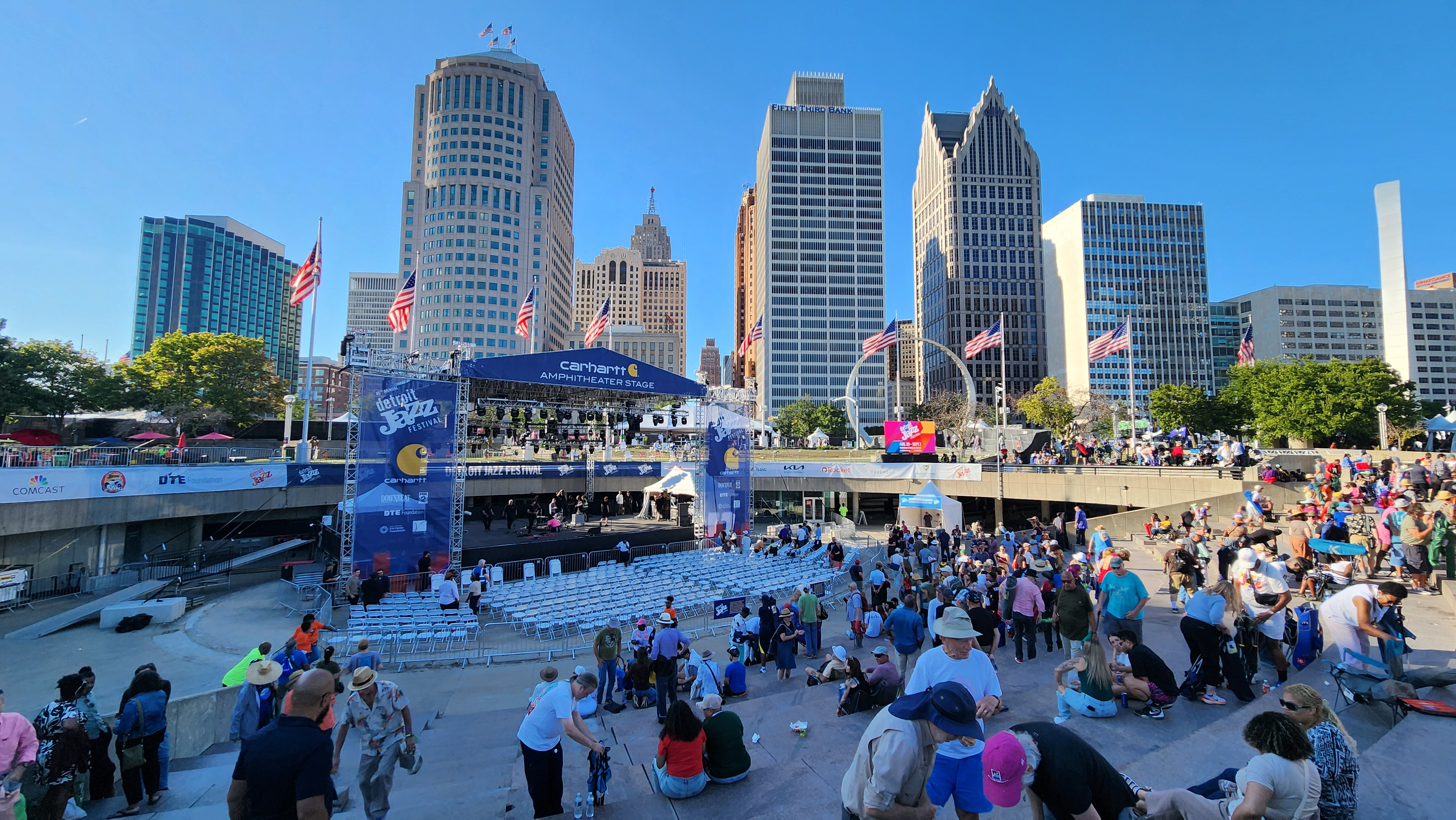
- Amphitheater Stage during the 2025 festival
- Genre: Jazz
- Dates: Weekend of Labor Day
- Frequency: Annually
- Venue: Hart Plaza and Campus Martius Park
- Locations: Detroit, Michigan, U.S.
- Coordinates: 42°19′53″N 83°02′45″W
- Years active: 1980–present
- Founder: Robert McCabe
- Most recent: August 29–September 1, 2025
- Next event: September 4–7, 2026
- Attendance: 300,000 (2024)
- Organiser: Detroit Jazz Festival Foundation
- Website: detroitjazzfest.com

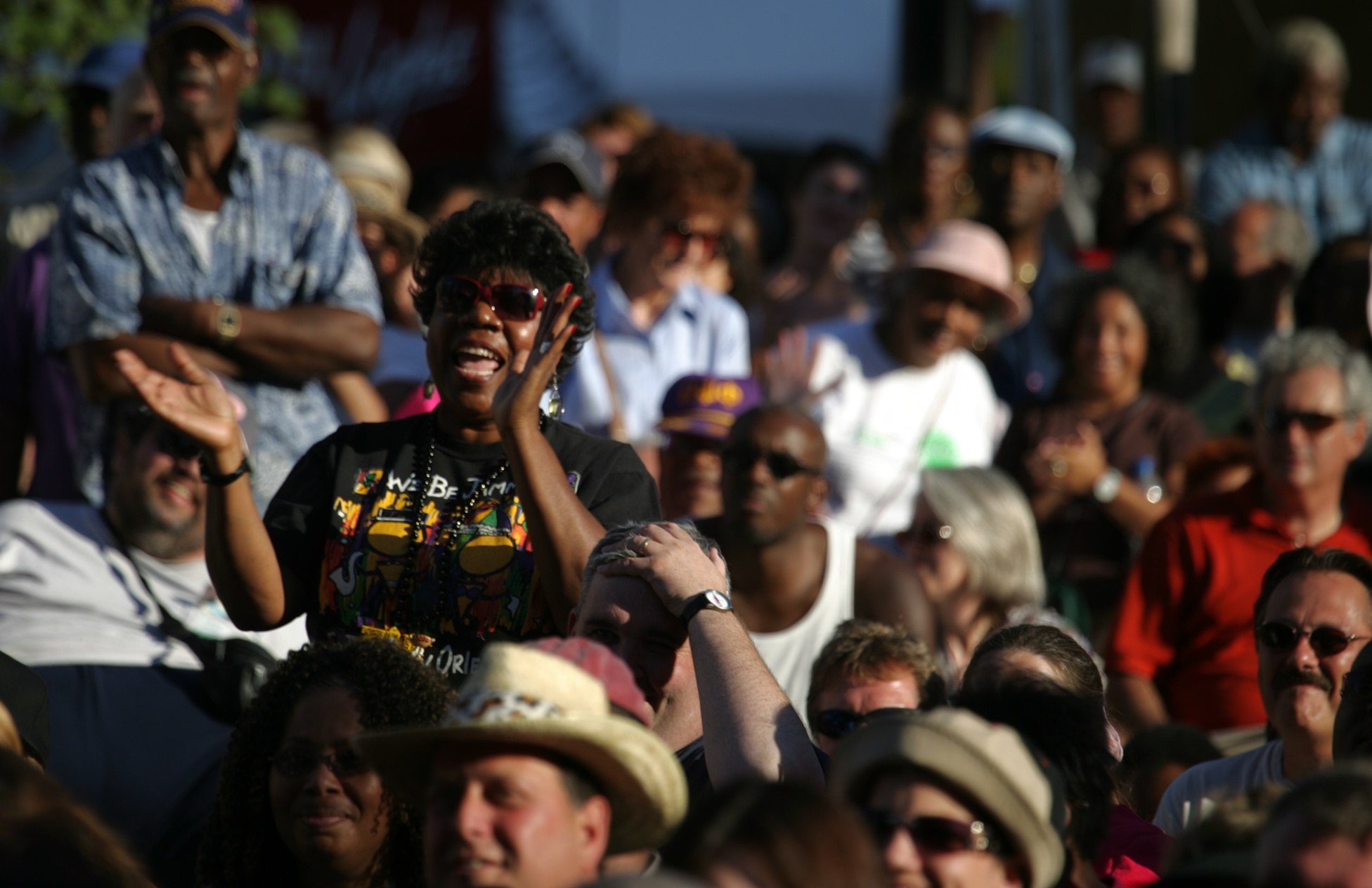
A crowd cheers The Blind Boys of Alabama performing on the Campus Martius stage at the Detroit International Jazz Festival in September 2005.

The Detroit Jazz Festival is an annual music festival held in Detroit, Michigan, United States. It is held in downtown Detroit during the weekend of Labor Day. With more than 60 acts performing each year, the Detroit Jazz Festival is the largest free jazz festival in the world. The festival is organized by the nonprofit Detroit Jazz Festival Foundation, and entirely supported by charitable donations, with no admission charge to enter the festival or concerts.

== Overview ==
The four-day festival is held annually over the weekend of Labor Day, beginning on the preceding Friday evening. Most performances take place across three stages in downtown Detroit: two in Hart Plaza near the riverfront, and one in Cadillac Square adjacent to Campus Martius Park in the center of downtown. The streets surrounding Campus Martius are closed to traffic during the festival weekend, with vendors set up along Woodward Avenue and in Hart Plaza. Since 2024, a small number of additional performances are held at the Gretchen C. Valade Jazz Center at Wayne State University, roughly 2.5 miles to the north in Midtown Detroit.

== History ==
The festival began in 1980 as the Montreux-Detroit Jazz Festival, founded by Robert McCabe, then-president of the nonprofit Detroit Renaissance. It was initially produced in partnership with the Montreux Jazz Festival in Switzerland, with many notable jazz artists performing at both events. The association with Montreux ended after the 1991 festival, with the Music Hall Center for the Performing Arts assuming production responsibilities beginning in 1992, though the event retained the Montreux-Detroit name through 1999.

From 2000 to 2004, the event was known as the Ford Detroit International Jazz Festival under a sponsorship agreement with the Ford Motor Company; after Ford withdrew from the event in 2005, it became known simply as the Detroit International Jazz Festival. The festival adopted its current name in 2012.

Music Hall produced the festival until 2005, after which production was taken over by the Detroit International Jazz Festival Foundation, an independent 501(c)(3) organization. The organization was founded in 2006 by Gretchen Valade, granddaughter of the founder of Carhartt and then-chair of Mack Avenue Records. Valade donated $10 million to the foundation, and is widely credited with saving the festival from financial failure. She chaired the foundation's board of directors until her death in December 2022. Following her death, the foundation partnered with Wayne State University to establish the Gretchen C. Valade Jazz Center in her honor; it opened in August 2024, and has hosted a portion of the festival each year since.

=== Notable artists ===
Performers have included Dave Brubeck, Gary Burton, Regina Carter, Chick Corea, Dave Holland, Joe Lovano, The Manhattan Transfer, Wynton Marsalis, Pat Metheny, Mulgrew Miller, Paquito d'Rivera, Sonny Rollins, Wayne Shorter, Take 6, and Tower of Power.

== See also ==
- Lansing JazzFest
- Music of Detroit
