= Boston Common, 8/17/71 =

Live album by The Allman Brothers Band
- Released: 2007
- Recorded: August 17, 1971
- Venue: Boston Common
- Genre: Southern rock
- Length: 79:29
- Label: Allman Brothers Band
- Producer: Allman Brothers Band

The Allman Brothers Band chronology
Gold (2005)	Boston Common, 8/17/71 (2007)	Play All Night: Live at the Beacon Theatre 1992 (2014)

Boston Common, 8/17/71 is a live album by the rock group the Allman Brothers Band. As the name suggests, it was recorded at Boston Common in Boston, Massachusetts, on August 17, 1971. It is the fifth archival release by the Allman Brothers Band Recording Company, and the third one to feature the original lineup of the band. It was released in 2007, and re-released in 2014.

== Critical reception ==
Professional ratings
Review scores
Source	Rating
AllMusic	3.5/5 stars
All About Jazz	3/5 stars

Allmusic said, "The group's outdoor appearance in Boston occurred six weeks after the release of their breakthrough album, At Fillmore East, and ten weeks before [Duane] Allman's death. The song selection doesn't just repeat the tunes from the Fillmore East disc, the band opting instead for a few songs not heard on it... This is an album for the faithful, and it will not disappoint them."

All About Jazz said, "... it will remind both the aficionado and the dilettante that the scintillating peaks scaled by the Brothers' At Fillmore East were nevertheless revisited fairly regularly. The group brings an edgy energy – and, during the lengthiest improvisations, an altogether melancholy majesty – to a fairly standard set."

== Track listing ==
1. Tuning – 2:01
2. "Statesboro Blues" (Blind Willie McTell) – 4:43
3. "Trouble No More" (Muddy Waters) – 4:53
4. "Don't Keep Me Wonderin'" (Gregg Allman) – 4:14
5. "You Don't Love Me" (Willie Cobbs) – 26:08
6. "Hoochie Coochie Man" (Willie Dixon) – 5:36
7. "In Memory of Elizabeth Reed" (Dickey Betts) – 13:02
8. "Whipping Post" (Gregg Allman) – 18:48

== Personnel ==
The Allman Brothers Band

- Duane Allman – guitar
- Gregg Allman – keyboards, vocals
- Dickey Betts – guitar
- Berry Oakley – bass, vocals on "Hoochie Coochie Man"
- Jaimoe – drums, percussion
- Butch Trucks – drums, timpani

Production

- Recording produced by the Allman Brothers Band
- Package produced by Kirk West, Bert Holman
- Mixing: Mike Callahan
- Mastering: Capt. Skipper Littlewood
- Package design: Lindsey Rogers
