= Pete Correll =

American businessman (1941–2021)

Alston Dayton "Pete" Correll (April 28, 1941 – May 25, 2021) was a businessman in the United States. He served as chairman of Grady Memorial Hospital Corporation and Atlanta Equity. He was chairman emeritus of Georgia-Pacific and had served as director of SunTrust Bank, Mirant and Norfolk Southern.

== Early life and education ==
Correll grew up in Brunswick, Georgia, where he worked at Correll's Men's Store, a family owned business. After graduating high school, Correll attended Georgia Tech on a golf scholarship. He left after a year to become a runner on the New York Stock Exchange. Correll then moved to Athens, Georgia to attend the University of Georgia, where he received his undergraduate degree in business administration. At Georgia, he became a member of the Delta Chapter of the Sigma Chi fraternity. He then received master's degrees in pulp and paper technology and in chemical engineering from the University of Maine.

== Career ==
Correll began his career with MeadWestvaco, and worked for a decade in management with the Weyerhaeuser Company. Correll was hired by Georgia-Pacific in 1988 as senior vice president and was promoted to executive vice president of pulp and paper in 1989. He was elected president and chief operating officer in 1991. From 1993 to 2005 he was the CEO and chairman of the board of Georgia-Pacific. In that role, Correll negotiated the deal with Koch Industries to take Georgia-Pacific private at an enterprise value of $21 billion.

Correll had also served as a director on the boards of Mirant, SunTrust Bank and Norfolk Southern. He also served on the boards of various industry and non-profit organizations, including Mother Nature Network, The Nature Conservancy, Georgia Chamber of Commerce, Keep America Beautiful, the President's Council on Sustainable Development, Atlanta Symphony, Boy Scouts of America, the Georgia Aquarium, the Institute of Paper Science and Technology, Grocery Manufacturers of America, The Carter Center and the University of Georgia Foundation. Correll served as vice chairman of the board of curators for the Georgia Historical Society.

He was the co-founder of Atlanta Equity, a private equity firm focused on investments in growth companies primarily in the Southeast.

== Awards and honors ==
- Catalyst Award
- Doing the Most Good Award - Salvation Army.
- Louis C. Brown Vanguard Award - Morehouse School of Medicine.
- Dan Sweat Award - Downtown Atlanta environmental award.
- Paperloop CEO of the year.
- 2017 Georgia Trustee, an honor given by the Georgia Historical Society in conjunction with the Governor of Georgia.

== Personal life ==
He was married to Ada Lee Correll and together they have established the Correll Foundation. Correll died from kidney failure on May 25, 2021, aged 80.
