= Sea Level (album) =

Studio album by Sea Level
- Released: 1977
- Length: 41:14
- Label: Capricorn
- Producer: Stewart Levine

Sea Level chronology
Sea Level (1977)	Cats on the Coast (1977)

Sea Level is the 1977 debut album by Sea Level which was released on the Capricorn Records label.

== Critical reception ==
Professional ratings
Review scores
Source	Rating
AllMusic	4/5 stars

On AllMusic Dave Lynch wrote, "Of course, the Allmans sound was a major touchstone for Sea Level; certainly, Leavell's pianism had reached its largest audience ever with his solo break on "Jessica", and he would bring similar stylings to his quartet's 1977 eponymous debut album. But Sea Level didn't need to stand in the shadow of any other group, as the debut made clear.... Sea Level was a fine debut from a killer quartet..."

== Track listing ==
All songs written by Chuck Leavell, except where noted.

1. "Rain in Spain" – 6:47
2. "Shake a Leg" (Edward Hoerner) – 3:53
3. "Tidal Wave" – 5:40
4. "Country Fool" – 3:39
5. "Nothing Matters But the Fever" – 7:20
6. "Grand Larceny" (Neil Larsen) –5:22
7. "Scarborough Fair" (Traditional) – 5:32
8. "Just a Good Feeling" – 3:01

== Personnel ==
- Chuck Leavell – keyboards, lead vocals
- Jimmy Nalls – guitars, vocals
- Lamar Williams – bass, vocals
- Jai Johanny Johanson – drums, percussion
- Ed Dowling – trumpet
