= Lamar Williams =

American musician (1949–1983)

- Born: January 14, 1949; Gulfport, Mississippi, U.S.
- Died: January 21, 1983 (aged 34) Los Angeles, California, U.S.
- Genres: Rock, Jam, Alternative rock, Southern rock
- Occupation: Musician
- Instrument: Bass guitar
- Years active: 1972–1983
- Formerly of: Sounds of Soul; The Allman Brothers Band; Sea Level; Wayne Sharp and The Sharpshooter Band

Lamar Williams (January 14, 1949 – January 21, 1983) was an American musician best known for being the bassist of the Allman Brothers Band (1972–1976) and Sea Level (1976–1980).

== Early years ==
Williams was born in Gulfport, Mississippi, and grew up in nearby Handsboro, Mississippi. He also spent time in Newton, Mississippi. A self-taught musician, he was attracted to the bass lines in songs and so sought to master that instrument. Beginning at age 14 he played with Deep South, a gospel music group that his father sang with.

Around 1965, he met drummer Jai Johanny Johanson (later to be known as Jaimoe) in high school and began playing in bands with him. They played in a number of groups along the Gulf Coast, the most known of which was George Woods' Sounds of Soul with whom Williams played from 1965 to 1967. Williams was influenced by bassists from James Jamerson in R&B to Stanley Clarke in jazz, and in turn Williams' R&B playing helped Jaimoe gain a better understanding of how to play the bass drum and where to place the beat.

== Military service ==
In 1968, Williams was drafted into the United States Army. Initially he was assigned to a Special Services band, which performed for Army basic training recruits, for non-commissioned officers' clubs, and for local townspeople. They played material from many different genres, including country and western and ragtime. Williams later reflected that it had been an interesting time musically and that, "I think it's important to have perspectives on different types of music and not let yourself get into a rut by playing only one style. I like to keep track of all of it."

Williams was then shipped overseas to South Vietnam, during the Vietnam War. He was opposed to this war in particular and was a pacifist who was opposed to killing in general. According to Willie Perkins, the Allmans' road manager, "one day when his unit took a column left, Lamar took a column right into the countryside." According to author Scott Freeman, who wrote a history of the Allman Brothers Band, Williams related that he went AWOL as soon as he arrived at an airbase in South Vietnam, running between two barracks and into the jungle. He wandered around the countryside for several months, occasionally joining a new unit and giving a story that he had become separated from his previous unit. Williams' story continued that he was arrested at one point but got free, and then after that, several black members of the Military Police let him know whenever the MPs were getting close to finding him again.

Williams was given an honorable discharge in 1970 with the rank of private. He went through a period of formal "processing out" of the Army and then adjusted to civilian life, including letting his hair grow longer. He jammed with a Biloxi group known as the Fungus Blues Band.

== Musical career ==
=== The Allman Brothers Band ===
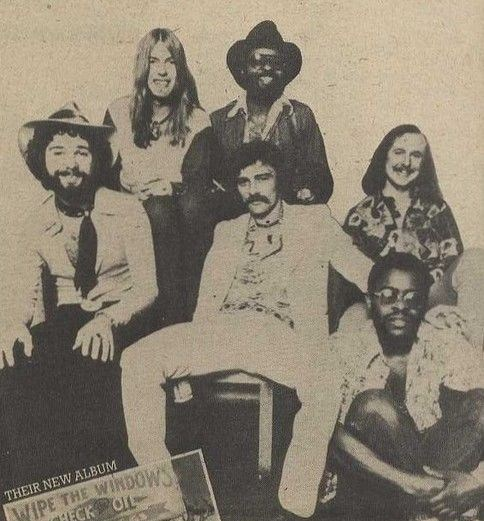
Williams (top center) with the Allman Brothers c. 1975–76

By then the Allman Brothers Band had achieved significant success with Jaimoe as one of their drummers, but had just suffered the death of original bassist Berry Oakley. Brought in to the group based on the Jaimoe connection, Williams was one of several possible replacements that they tried out. During Williams' audition, the band's other drummer, Butch Trucks, suddenly declared after three songs, "Enough of this tryout shit, let's rehearse." Williams thus joined the Allmans in late 1972.

Although rooted in the contrapuntal fluidity of Jamerson's style, Williams' style was more traditional than Oakley's lead guitar-like approach, freeing the band's drummers to be more adventurous. The Allmans found the peak of their commercial success during this time period. Williams played on most of the tracks on the group's best-selling album, 1973's Brothers and Sisters, and was with them as they played arenas and stadiums on tour and performed before 600,000 fans at the Summer Jam at Watkins Glen.

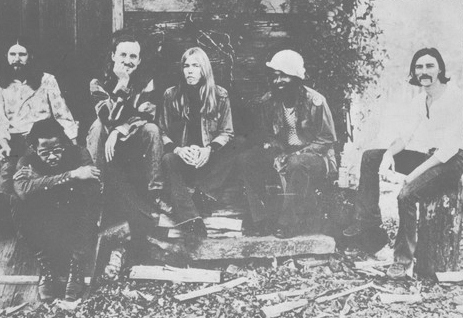
Another view of the mid-1970s Allman Brothers, with Williams second from right

Williams, like the other new member, pianist Chuck Leavell, was a salaried employee of the corporation formed by the surviving four members of the group. The group did not handle fame well and began to disintegrate in the mid-1970s. During this period, Leavell, Williams, and Jaimoe felt a tight bond with each other, while Trucks, Gregg Allman, and Dickey Betts went their own ways.

When the Allman Brothers Band reformed in the late 1970s, consideration was given to Leavell and Williams returning, but the two wanted to keep Sea Level going rather than give a full-time commitment to the Allmans and so they declined.

=== Sea Level ===
After the Allmans dissolved in 1976, Williams founded Sea Level with Johanson and Leavell of the Allmans. In Sea Level he played in a looser, jazzier fashion. Sea Level became moderately successful.

Williams left Sea Level in 1980, shortly before that band broke up.

=== Wayne Sharp and The Sharpshooter Band ===
Soon after, Jaimoe and Lamar were asked to join longtime friend from Mississippi, Wayne Sharp and his band, The SharpShooter Band, in California. The SharpShooter Band went into the studio and then went on tour. Lamar became ill while touring. In January 1983, Lamar died, and the band went on hold.

== Personal life and family ==
Williams married Marian Belina in 1974 and they had two children.

One child, Lamar Williams, Jr., is also a musician and is currently a singer of the band Trouble No More, a band that since March 2022 is performing the Allman Brothers Band studio album Eat A Peach. In 2023 Trouble No More will be performing the fourth album Brothers And Sisters. From 2015 to 2017, he also performed with several Allman Brothers alumni, including Johanson, Trucks, percussionist Marc Quiñones and bassist Oteil Burbridge, as a vocalist in Les Brers. The short-lived band (envisioned as a continuation of the Allman Brothers Band's stylistic approach) fulfilled its final engagement in August 2017 following Trucks' death in January of that year.

One of Williams' brothers, James Williams, is also a bassist. He is a founding member of the Lansing, Michigan-based blues band Root Doctor.

== Illness and death ==
Williams was found to have lung cancer in 1981. His doctors believed that the disease was derived from exposure to Agent Orange during his Vietnam service. He had extensive surgery and underwent chemotherapy. He spent much of his final year at Veterans Affairs medical facilities in the Los Angeles area.

He died less than two years later, seven days after his 34th birthday, on January 21, 1983, in Los Angeles. Funeral services were held back in Gulfport. He is buried in Biloxi National Cemetery in Biloxi, Mississippi.

The non-profit Lamar Williams Foundation For Agent Orange Research was established after his death, with monies from some benefit concerts in 1985 and 1986 going to it and other Vietnam War related organizations. The foundation was subsequently merged into the larger Welcome Home, Inc. organization, which was concerned with a variety of challenges facing Vietnam veterans.

In 2015, the Mississippi Blues Trail placed a historical marker titled "Gulfport Boogie" to honor Jaimoe, Williams, and others from the immediate area who had left their mark on the American musical landscape.

== Discography ==
The Allman Brothers Band

- Brothers and Sisters (1973)
- Win, Lose or Draw (1975)
- Wipe the Windows, Check the Oil, Dollar Gas (1976)
- Nassau Coliseum, Uniondale, NY: 5/1/73 (2005)

Sea Level

- Sea Level (1977)
- Cats on the Coast (1977)
- On the Edge (1978)
- Long Walk on a Short Pier (1979)
- Ball Room (1980)
