= Wipe the Windows, Check the Oil, Dollar Gas =

Live album by The Allman Brothers Band
- Released: November 1976
- Recorded: 1972–1975
- Genres: Southern rock; blues rock
- Length: 71:31
- Label: Capricorn
- Producer: The Allman Brothers Band

The Allman Brothers Band chronology
The Road Goes On Forever (1975)	Wipe the Windows, Check the Oil, Dollar Gas (1976)	Enlightened Rogues (1979)

Professional ratings
Review scores
Source	Rating
Allmusic	3.5/5 stars
Christgau's Record Guide	B−
Rolling Stone Album Guide	2.5/5 stars

Wipe the Windows, Check the Oil, Dollar Gas is a 1976 double live album by the Allman Brothers Band.

It collected a variety of performances from the popular mid-1970s line-up of the band, which featured pianist Chuck Leavell and bassist Lamar Williams. Songs from their popular 1973 Brothers and Sisters album were heavily featured, but each of their other studio albums was represented by a selection as well.

Released after the group had already dissolved in acrimony, the album did not attract much praise or even attention at the time. The band did not like the selections, the sound mixing on the album was poor, the packaging was substandard, and the record also inevitably suffered by comparison to their classic 1971 At Fillmore East, generally considered one of the best live albums of all time.

Nevertheless, some of the 1973 performances, such as of "Southbound", are strong, and the energetic 1975 run-through of "Can't Lose What You Never Had" showed why it had enjoyed much of the progressive rock radio airplay off that year's Win, Lose or Draw. The New Year's Eve 1972 nightclub performance of "Ain't Wastin' Time No More", a number originally recorded shortly after the band lost Duane Allman and now being played shortly after the band lost Berry Oakley, illustrated the group's mixture of lament and resolve.

Decades after its release, both Leavell and drummer Jaimoe spoke favorably of the record, saying that despite the lack of previously unreleased songs and the problems surrounding the band at the time, there was much excellent playing on it. Jaimoe said, "that's a hell of a record and I'm glad we captured the Chuck and Lamar era. It didn't last all that long."

The album's title is derived from the song "Too Much Monkey Business" by Chuck Berry. Album cover art was by Jim Evans.

== Track listing ==
=== Side one ===
1. Introduction by Bill Graham – 1:05
2. "Wasted Words" (Gregg Allman) – 5:10
3. "Southbound" (Dickey Betts) – 6:03
4. "Ramblin' Man" (Dickey Betts) – 7:09

=== Side two ===
1. "In Memory of Elizabeth Reed" (Dickey Betts) – 17:19

=== Side three ===
1. "Ain't Wastin' Time No More" (Gregg Allman) – 5:41
2. "Come and Go Blues" (Gregg Allman) – 5:05
3. "Can't Lose What You Never Had" (McKinley Morganfield aka Muddy Waters) – 6:43

=== Side four ===
1. "Don't Want You No More" (Spencer Davis, Edward Hardin) – 2:48
2. "It's Not My Cross to Bear" (Gregg Allman) – 5:23
3. "Jessica" (Dickey Betts) – 9:05

Side one and side two recorded at Winterland, San Francisco, California, September 26, 1973.
Side three, track 1 recorded at The Warehouse, New Orleans, Louisiana, December 31, 1972.
Side three, track 2 recorded at the Summer Jam at Watkins Glen, New York, July 28, 1973.
Side three, track 3 and Side four tracks 1–2 recorded at the Bakersfield Civic Auditorium, Bakersfield, California, October 22, 1975.
Side four, track 3 recorded at the Oakland Coliseum, Oakland, California, October 24, 1975.

== Personnel ==
- Gregg Allman – lead vocals, Hammond B-3 organ, Hohner Clavinet, guitar
- Richard Betts – lead vocals, lead guitar, slide guitar
- Chuck Leavell – piano, electric piano, background vocals
- Lamar Williams – electric bass
- Jaimoe – drums, percussion
- Butch Trucks – drums, percussion, timpani

== Charts ==
Chart (1976–1977)	Peak position
Canada Top Albums/CDs (RPM)	68
US Billboard 200	75
