= G. L. Crockett =

- Birth name: George L. Crockett
- Also known as: G. Davy Crockett
- Born: September 18, 1928; Carrollton, Mississippi, U.S.
- Died: February 15, 1967 (aged 38); Chicago, Illinois, U.S.
- Genres: Rhythm and blues
- Occupation: Singer
- Instrument: Vocals
- Years active: 1950s–1967
- Labels: Chief, Four Brothers, Checker

George L. Crockett (September 18, 1928 – February 15, 1967), also known as G. Davy Crockett, was an American R&B singer, whose best known records were "Look Out Mabel" in 1957 and "It's A Man Down There", an R&B hit in 1965.

== Biography ==
He was born in Carrollton, Mississippi, United States. Little is known of his life, but by the mid-1950s he was living in Chicago where he performed with Freddie King and Magic Sam. He made his first recording, "Look Out Mabel", on which he was credited as G. Davy Crockett to cash in on the Davy Crockett craze of the period. It was issued in late 1957, on the Chief label owned by Mel London. Although positively reviewed by Billboard, and now seen as a rockabilly classic, it was not a hit and Crockett made no more recordings for several years.

Some reports state that he lived in Washington, D.C. during the 1960s. In 1965, he recorded several more tracks for the Four Brothers record label run by Jack Daniels in Chicago. They included "It's A Man Down There", which reached number 13 on the Billboard R&B chart and number 67 on the Hot 100. Its success led to an answer record ("I'm the Man Down There") by Jimmy Reed, and to an alternate take of "Look Out Mabel" being released by Checker Records. However, Crockett failed to follow up his commercial success, and Jack Daniels later said that Crockett's alcoholism made him difficult to work with.

Crockett died in Chicago in 1967, aged 38, of a cerebral haemorrhage resulting from hypertension.

"Look Out Mabel" has been reissued on several compilations of rockabilly and rock and roll music, particularly in Europe.

== Discography ==
=== Singles ===
- "Look Out Mabel" / "Did You Ever Love Somebody (That Didn't Love You)" (Chief 7010, 1957)
- "It's A Man Down There" / "Every Hour, Every Day" (Four Brothers 445, 1965)
- "Every Good-Bye Ain't Gone" / "Watch My 32" (Four Brothers 448, 1965)
- "Think Twice Before You Go" / "Gonna Make You Mine" (Four Brothers 451, 1966)

=== Compilation albums ===
- G. L. Crockett Meets Big Walter Price - Rockin' With The Blues (Official of-CD 5679, 2003)
