= Sealevel Systems =

Sealevel Systems, Inc.
- Type: Private
- Industry: Hardware & software
- Founded: 1986
- Headquarters: Liberty, South Carolina, United States
- Key people: Tom O’Hanlan, Founder, CEO
- Products: Computing/HMI, serial boards, I/O boards
- Net income: Not Reported
- Website: www.sealevel.com

Sealevel Systems, Inc. is a privately held manufacturer headquartered in Liberty, South Carolina, which develops computer circuit I/O boards.

== Company overview ==
Sealevel Systems was founded by Tom O’Hanlan and his wife Susan, in 1986.

In 1991 the company released a dual port serial card that allowed users to set its I/O addresses to any two COM ports. In 1994, Sealevel developed the RS-485 auto-enabled circuit. The circuit eliminated the need to control the RS-485 transceiver-enable signal via software and removed the risk of communications error due to bus communications.

In 1997, O’Hanlan was granted a patent for a communication device that transmitted asynchronous formatted data synchronously. The company produced the communications card used for positioning the Space Shuttle's robotic arm in 2002. Tom O’Hanlan and technical author Jon Titus co-authored a book, The Digital I/O Handbook, in 2004.

In 2005, Sealevel Systems released the industry's first RoHS-compliant serial I/O board. In 2008, Sealevel won a defense contract for a USB/serial port cable with a heavily encased circuit board. The cable allows soldiers in the field to link laptops to AN/PRC-117F Multiband Manpack Radio (MBMMR) tactical radios, manufactured by any company, and transmit data, including GPS maps, images, coordinates and IM-type communications via radio signal instead of by satellite. It took seven years for the company to perfect the technology. In 2013 the company was awarded a sole-source contract for Naval Air Systems Command for this cable.
