= Joey Reiman =

American businessman and author

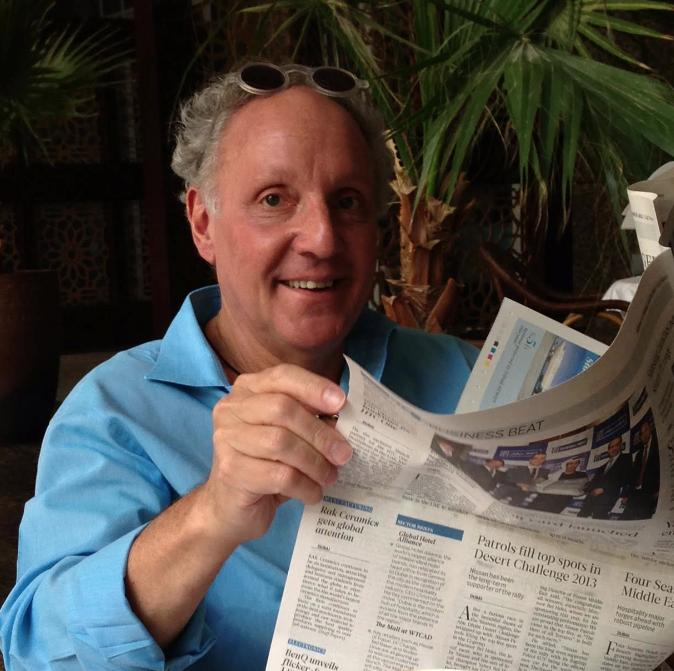
- Born: Joseph Alden Reiman; 31 March 1953 (age 71); New York City, US
- Education: Brandeis University
- Occupation(s): Businessman, author
- Spouse: Cynthia Good
- Children: 2 sons
- Website: www.joeyreiman.com

Joseph Alden Reiman (born March 31, 1953) is an American advertising businessman and author.

== Early life ==
Joseph Alden Reiman was born to a Jewish family in New York City on March 31, 1953, to businessman Henri Reiman and astrologer Phyllis Joy. He is a graduate of Brandeis University with a bachelor's degree in American Studies. After graduation, Reiman interned under director Federico Fellini in Rome, Italy. While in Italy, Reiman was a passenger in a car accident where he was partially paralyzed, losing the use of his right arm. Six months after his accident Reiman entered the world of advertising.

== Career ==
Reiman served as chairman of the advertising agency Babbitt & Reiman until its acquisition by the London-based GGT in the early 1990s. He went on to become the founder and CEO of the Joey Reiman Agency, where he remained until 1995. BrightHouse has worked on campaigns for clients such as The Coca-Cola Company, Procter & Gamble, McDonald's, Pepperidge Farm and Newell Brands.

== Bibliography ==
- The Best Year of Your Life: Make It Happen Now (1996, ISBN 978-1563523496)
- Thinking for a Living: Creating Ideas that Revitalize Your Business, Career, and Life (2001, ISBN 978-1-56352-469-1)
- Success: The Original Handbook (2002, ISBN 9781563520440)
- Business at the Speed of Molasses How Patience Produces Profits (2007, ISBN 9781400051489)
- The Story of Purpose: The Path to Creating a Brighter Brand, a Great Company, and a Lasting Legacy (2013, ISBN 978-1-118-44369-9)

== Personal life ==
Reiman is married to Cynthia Good, founder and owner of Little Pink Book. Together the couple has two sons, Alden and Julien. Reiman is an adjunct marketing professor at the Goizueta Business School of Emory University. He leads workshops for fortune 500 companies. Joey is also a frequent marketing and branding guest expert on CNN.
