= Chuck Leavell =

American musician (born 1952)

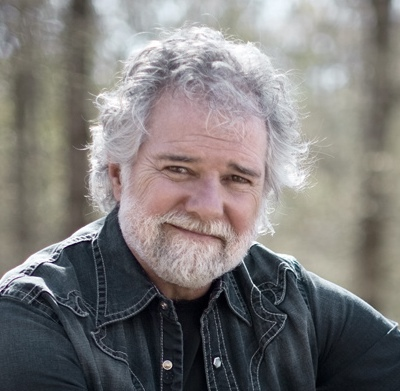
- Leavell in 2009

Background information
- Born: Charles Alfred Leavell; April 28, 1952 (age 74); Birmingham, Alabama, U.S.
- Genres: Blues rock; southern rock
- Occupations: Musician; singer; songwriter; author
- Instruments: Keyboards; vocals
- Years active: 1966–present
- Label: Capricorn
- Spouse: Rose Lane White Leavell (m. 1973)
- Website: chuckleavell.com

Charles Alfred Leavell (born April 28, 1952) is an American musician. A member of the Allman Brothers Band throughout their commercial zenith in the 1970s, he subsequently became a founding member of the band Sea Level. He has served as the principal touring keyboardist and musical director of the Rolling Stones since 1982. As a session musician, Leavell has performed on every Rolling Stones studio album released since 1983 with the exception of Bridges to Babylon (1997), Hackney Diamonds (2023) and Foreign Tongues (2026). He has also toured and recorded with Eric Clapton, George Harrison, David Gilmour, Gov't Mule, Train, John Mayer, and Widespread Panic.

== Biography ==
Born in Birmingham, Alabama, Leavell is a mostly self-taught musician. He started on piano, learning some basics from his mother, Frances Leavell. The Leavell family moved from Birmingham to Montgomery, Alabama when he was five and then back to Birmingham for a few years before finally settling in Tuscaloosa, Alabama in 1962. He learned to play guitar from his cousin, Winston Leavell, and played tuba in junior high for two years. He started his first band, The Misfitz, in 1966. The Misfitz played a steady gig at the YMCA every Friday night, and eventually were the band for a Saturday morning television show, Tuscaloosa Bandstand. After the breakup of the Misfitz, Leavell did session work, and found himself on his first gold record, a single by Freddie North called "Don't Take Her She's All I've Got". Leavell also sought out other local musicians to play with and joined The South Camp in 1968. That band included his early mentor, Paul Hornsby, who had played in The Hour Glass, a precursor to The Allman Brothers Band.

In 1969, Hornsby moved to Macon, Georgia to work for Capricorn Records as a studio musician and producer, eventually producing such artists as The Charlie Daniels Band, The Marshall Tucker Band, Wet Willie and others. At Hornsby's suggestion, Leavell came to Macon and helped form Sundown, which recorded one record on the Ampex label in 1970. That band broke up shortly thereafter, and Leavell found himself doing session work at Capricorn and eventually was tapped to tour with Alex Taylor, James Taylor's elder brother. Leavell recorded one record with Taylor, Dinnertime, which was released in 1972. Leavell continued to tour with Taylor for a short time afterwards. When Taylor had a falling out with his manager and the founder of Capricorn, Phil Walden, and quit touring, Leavell found himself playing with Dr. John. Leavell claims this was his "college education."

While playing with Dr. John, Leavell caught the attention of Gregg Allman, who tapped him to play on his first solo album, the Johnny Sandlin-produced Laid Back. Allman and Sandlin introduced the rest of the Allman Brothers Band to Leavell, and Leavell joined the band in September 1972, when they decided not to recreate their dual lead guitar sound after the death of Duane Allman, who had died the previous October, but rather to use a different instrument as the second lead. Leavell's work was most prominent on the band's popular 1973 album Brothers and Sisters, and in particular on the heavily played instrumental "Jessica." However, only one studio album, 1975's Win, Lose or Draw, followed, again with Leavell's piano and keyboard work featured.

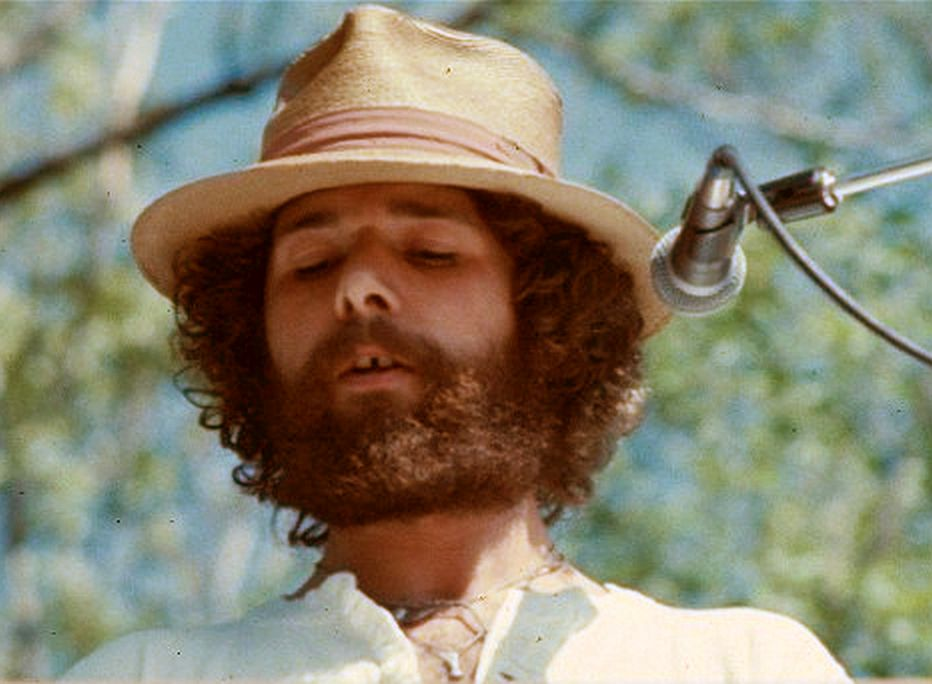
Leavell with Sea Level

In 1973, Leavell married Rose Lane White, who was working as a staff member at Capricorn Records. The Allmans toured heavily behind Brothers and Sisters, playing stadiums and breaking records for attendance in many venues across the country. Leavell also appeared on a live record with the band, Wipe the Windows, Check the Oil, Dollar Gas during this era as well as subsequent compilations, live performances and re-releases in later years. During the mid-1970s Leavell also appeared on Dickey Betts's first solo record, Highway Call. In addition during this time, he made multiple contributions on several other Capricorn artists' recordings like Bobby Whitlock, Bonnie Bramlett, The Marshall Tucker Band, Cowboy and more as well as recordings outside the Capricorn family with Tim Weisberg, Charlie Daniels and others.

While opening shows for The Allman Brothers Band with The Allman Brothers' bass guitarist Lamar Williams and drummer Jaimoe, Leavell stepped up as a frontman for the first time in his career. After The Allman Brothers Band disbanded in May 1976, the trio added guitarist Jimmy Nalls and set about touring behind the moniker Sea Level, derived from Leavell's first initial and last name. The group lasted five years and released as many albums, each featuring a different configuration of the group.

From 1982 to 1984, he was part of the group Betts, Hall, Leavell and Trucks, which had been organized by Betts. Although the group received good critical notices, and is viewed positively in retrospect by Leavell, it was unable to garner a recording contract.

Leavell's first encounters with The Rolling Stones were auditions on Long View Farm for the spot of piano player alongside Ian Stewart for the Rolling Stones 1981 United States tour. Even though Ian McLagan was chosen, Leavell guested at the Rolling Stones' Atlanta gig on October 26, 1981. For the 1982 European Tour Leavell landed the position of keyboardist alongside Ian Stewart. Leavell continued to record with the Stones on their next two albums, during a time when the band was not touring. After Stewart's death in 1985, Leavell occupied the role of the group's keyboardist by himself, with the exception of the addition of Matt Clifford on the Steel Wheels record and tour. He has continued to tour and record with The Rolling Stones ever since, as well as recording with Mick Jagger and Keith Richards on solo projects. He continued to go on tour with The Rolling Stones, as of 2006, as part of their record-grossing A Bigger Bang Tour. He served as the unofficial "musical director" for the band and devised each night's set list with Mick Jagger. "It's my job to keep Mick, Keith, Charlie and Ronnie all happy", Leavell stated on his web page. He began keeping notes on the songs during rehearsals, which eventually led to his role with the band.

In addition to his work with The Rolling Stones, Leavell has worked with George Harrison, Eric Clapton, Gov't Mule, Train, Tinsley Ellis, The Black Crowes, The Fabulous Thunderbirds, Montgomery Gentry, John Mayer, Miranda Lambert, Blues Traveller amongst many others in the studio and on the road, in addition to recording five solo albums.

In 2003, Leavell participated in the annual improvisational musical experiment known as Zambiland Orchestra in Atlanta.

Leavell was inducted into the Georgia Music Hall of Fame in 2004. He is also a member of the Alabama Music Hall of Fame. In an April 2007 radio interview on WOR-AM, Leavell said his favorite contributions to songs in his career were "Jessica" with The Allman Brothers Band, "Old Love" on Eric Clapton's Unplugged, Out of Tears on The Rolling Stones' Voodoo Lounge, and Drops of Jupiter by Train.

In 2011, Leavell played on John Mayer's album Born and Raised which was released in May 2012, reaching Number One on the Billboard Chart. He also worked with David Gilmour, who reached to him out of the blue years after meeting on a session with Eric Clapton in the early 1990s.

In February 2012, he and the other existing members of the Allman Brothers Band received a Grammy Lifetime Achievement Award. In addition to his time in the band from 1972 to 1976, Leavell performed two shows with the reunited Allman Brothers Band in 1986. Since 2001, he has performed as a guest pianist at more than a dozen Allman Brothers Band concerts, including multiple shows at the Beacon Theatre in New York City.

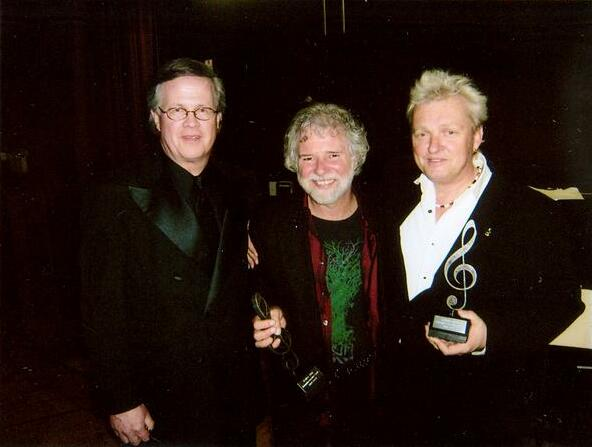
Left to Right: Ray Reach, Chuck Leavell and Peter Wolf at the 2008 BAMA Awards in Birmingham, Alabama

Leavell enjoys "giving back" to the community of his birth. In 1992, he played on a record titled "Mr. President", which was produced by noted Birmingham jazz keyboardist and vocalist Ray Reach for the purpose of raising money for the homeless in the Birmingham area. Leavell and several other well-known Alabama musicians (including Wayne Perkins, Chuck Tilley, Charlie Hayward, and Kelley O'Neal) donated their time for this project.

On March 20, 2008, Leavell was given a BAMA Award (Birmingham Area Music Award) for his contributions to the Birmingham, Alabama musical heritage. The 2008 BAMA Awards ceremony was held at the Alabama Jazz Hall of Fame (in the historic Carver Theatre in the Birmingham Civil Rights District). Leavell performed at this ceremony accompanied by the Alabama Jazz Hall of Fame All-Stars directed by Ray Reach. Also, at the same ceremony, a BAMA Award was bestowed upon keyboardist/producer Peter Wolf.

Leavell makes time to involve himself with other causes, and in 2008 performed with a supergroup which opened for Chuck Berry in Boston. The concert raised money for artists struggling with addiction. Leavell also serves on the Georgia Commission for Hearing Impaired and Deaf Persons.

In 2013, Leavell was nominated for a Blues Music Award in the 'Pinetop Perkins Piano Player' category. Leavell is the celebrity spokesperson for Sealevel Systems, Inc.

A documentary of Chuck Leavell's career and life outside of music, Chuck Leavell: The Tree Man, directed by Allen Farst, premiered at Dayton, Ohio's "The Neon" theatre on November 6, 2020. The film, featured in a number of film festivals in 2020, won the Sedona Film Festival's People's Choice Award.

The film, featuring Mick Jagger, Keith Richards, Charlie Watts, Ronnie Wood, David Gilmour, Dickey Betts, Warren Haynes, John Mayer, Julian Lennon, Billy Bob Thornton, Charlie Daniels, Bonnie Raitt, Bruce Hornsby, Chris Robinson, Miranda Lambert, Eric Church, Mike Mills, Pat Monahan, John Popper, and Lee Ann Womack among others, was made available for streaming beginning December 1, 2020.

=== Tree farmer and conservationist ===
In addition to his musical career, Leavell is a tree farmer in Twiggs County outside Macon, Georgia, an occupation that began when his wife, Rose Lane Leavell, inherited land in the early 1980s. Together they created Charlane Plantation, now a 2500-acre award-winning Tree Farm and hunting preserve. The Leavells are two-time Georgia Tree Farmers of the Year, and were selected as National Outstanding Tree Farmers of the Year in 1999. They are staunch supporters of sustainable forestry, conservation and environmental protection. Chuck Leavell wrote his first book, Forever Green: The History and Hope of The American Forest in 2000. His autobiography, Between Rock and a Home Place was published in 2005, and is acclaimed as one of the best rock autobiographies ever published. In 2006, Leavell wrote a children's book, The Tree Farmer. His most recent book is Growing A Better America: Smart, Strong, Sustainable (2011, with J. Marshall Craig), the theme of which is "smart" growth. It has been called one of the best "common sense environmental books of all time".

Leavell was appointed by former Georgia Governor Sonny Perdue to the Georgia Land Conservation Council in 2008. He has also served on the Boards of The American Forest Foundation, The United States Endowment for Forestry and Communities and other influential non-profits and makes frequent trips to Washington, D.C. to discuss forestry and environmental policy matters with lawmakers on both sides of the aisle. In February 2012, the same month he received the Lifetime Achievement Grammy Award, he was given an Honorary Forest Ranger award from the United States Forest Service. He has stated that he reveres both of these honors equally.

Leavell and Joel Babbit are the co-founders of The Mother Nature Network, an environmental news and information website that launched in January 2009. The site has grown to be the most visited independent environmental website in the world. Leavell serves as Director of Environmental Affairs, and sits on the board of directors for the company. He hosts two video series on mnn.com: "Love of the Land," in which he discusses sustainability and conservation issues, and "In The Green Room," a series in which he interviews fellow celebrities about the environment and their philanthropic work.

On June 26, 2025, Leavell was presented with the Daughters of the American Revolution's President General's Medallion, in recognition of his musical achievements and advocacy for American forests, by Pamela Rouse Wright during the opening ceremony of the 134th Continental Congress at DAR Constitution Hall in Washington, D.C.

Leavell hosts the public television series America's Forests with Chuck Leavell.

In 2022, Leavell was recognized as an honorary lifetime member of the Society of American Foresters in recognition of his “commitment to understanding forest management practices, engaging policymakers to support our nation’s forests, and using his platform to communicate the critical benefits and pressing challenges of our forests”.

=== Educator ===
In response to requests from fans and teachers alike, Leavell and Howard Citron co-founded IROCKU, a rock and blues piano instructional website that launched in June 2011. The website includes classic rock and blues piano arrangements, video lessons, and also offers live lessons with stage and session musicians. In August 2017, Leavell and Citron received a United States Patent entitled “ Apparatus, System and Method for Teaching Music and Other Art Forms” related to IROCKU's web-based teaching methodology.

== Discography ==
Solo albums

- (1996) A Homemade Christmas from Charlane Plantation
- (1998) What's in That Bag?
- (2001) Forever Blue: Solo Piano
- (2005) Southscape
- (2007) Live in Germany: Green Leaves and Blue Notes Tour
- (2012) Back to The Woods: A Tribute to the Pioneers of Blues Piano
- (2018) Chuck Gets Big (with the Frankfurt Radio Big Band)

Alex Taylor

- (1972) Dinnertime

Sailcat

- (1972) Sailcat Self-titled

Gregg Allman

- (1973) Laid Back

The Allman Brothers Band

- (1973) Brothers and Sisters
- (1975) Win, Lose or Draw
- (1976) Wipe the Windows, Check the Oil, Dollar Gas
- (1989) Dreams

Chuck Berry

- (1987) Hail Hail Rock 'N' Roll - (Original Motion Picture Soundtrack)

Dickey Betts

- (1974) Highway Call

Aretha Franklin

- (1986) Aretha

Sea Level

- (1977) Sea Level
- (1977) Cats on the Coast
- (1978) On the Edge
- (1979) Long Walk on a Short Pier
- (1980) Ball Room
- (1997) Best of Sea Level

Duke Jupiter

- (1978) Sweet Cheeks (producer)

The Rolling Stones

- (1983) Undercover
- (1984) Rewind (1971–1984)
- (1986) Dirty Work
- (1989) Steel Wheels
- (1991) Flashpoint
- (1993) Jump Back: The Best of The Rolling Stones
- (1994) Voodoo Lounge
- (1995) Stripped
- (1998) No Security
- (2002) Forty Licks
- (2004) Live Licks
- (2005) A Bigger Bang
- (2005) Rarities 1971–2003
- (2008) Shine a Light
- (2012) Light the Fuse (a digital download through Google Music)
- (2012) GRRR!
- (2013) Hyde Park Live
- (2015) From the Vault – Live at the Tokyo Dome
- (2015) Sticky Fingers Live
- (2015) From the Vault – Live in Leeds 1982
- (2016) Totally Stripped
- (2016) Havana Moon
- (2016) Blue & Lonesome
- (2017) Sticky Fingers – Live At The Fonda Theatre 2015
- (2018) San Jose '99
- (2018) Voodoo Lounge Uncut
- (2019) Bridges to Bremen
- (2019) HONK
- (2019) Bridges to Buenos Aires
- (2020) Steel Wheels Live (10" Vinyl, 2 track, Picture Disc, RSD 2020)
- (2020) Steel Wheels Live
- (2021) A Bigger Bang Live (10" Vinyl, 2 track, RSD 2021)
- (2021) A Bigger Bang: Live on Copacabana Beach
- (2022) Licked Live in NYC
- (2023) Grrr Live!
- (2024) Live at the Wiltern
- (2024) Welcome to Shepherd's Bush

The Black Crowes

- (1990) Shake Your Money Maker

Eric Clapton

- (1992) Unplugged
- (1991) 24 Nights

Tom Principato

- (1992) Tip of the Iceberg

Gov't Mule

- (1998) Live... With a Little Help from Our Friends

Train

- (2001) Drops of Jupiter

John Mayer

- (2012) Born and Raised
- (2013) Paradise Valley

David Gilmour

- (2017) Live at Pompeii

George Harrison

- (1992) Live in Japan

Col. Bruce Hampton and the Aquarium Rescue Unit

- (1992) Col. Bruce Hampton & the Aquarium Rescue Unit

Pistol Annies

- (2018) Interstate Gospel

== Bibliography ==
- Leavell, Chuck, with Mary Welch. Forever Green: The History and Hope of the American Forest. Evergreen Arts, 2001. ISBN 0-86554-900-1.
- Leavell, Chuck, with J. Marshall Craig. Between Rock and a Home Place. Mercer University Press, 2004. ISBN 0-86554-975-3.
- Leavell, Chuck. Chuck Leavell: Piano Instruction, Vol. 1 (DVD) 2005.
- Leavell, Chuck, Nicholas Cravotta, and Rebecca Bleau. The Tree Farmer. VSP Books, 2005. ISBN 1-893622-16-9.
- Leavell, Chuck, with J. Marshall Craig. Growing A Better America: Smart, Strong, Sustainable, Evergreen Arts, 2011. ISBN 0-615434-58-4
