= Old Town BluesFest =

Music festival in Michigan

Coordinates: 42°44′1″N 84°32′48″W

- Genre: Blues
- Locations: Lansing, Michigan, United States
- Years active: Since 1994
- Attendance: 20,000+

The Old Town BluesFest is a free music festival that takes place each year in the early autumn in Lansing, Michigan. It showcases nationally, regionally, and locally known blues artists such as W. C. Clark, Graná Louise, Byther Smith, Eddie Shaw and the Wolf Gang, A.C. Reed, Jan James, and Lady Sunshine and the X Band, Calvin Cooke and Sacred Steel Ensemble, Mojo Phoenix, Those Delta Rhythm Kings, the Automatic Blues Band, Root Doctor, Doug Deming and the All Stars, J.R. Clark, and more. The festival welcomes nearly 20,000 attendees over the weekend of the festival.

== Festival history ==
The Old Town BluesFest was started by the Old Town Business and Art Development Association in 1994 under the name OctoberFest and without the specific focus on blues music. Lansing's alternative radio station, 92.1 WWDX, signed on as media sponsor; Message Makers, a local media company, became the founding business sponsor. In its early years, the festival welcomed such renowned artists as Marcy Playground, Kid Rock, Duncan Sheik and 19 Wheels, as well as local artists Powerface, Knee Deep Shag, The Lash, and The Weepers. In its early years, the festival had 2,000-3,000 attendees.

In 2003, the festival committee changed the focus of the festival to blues music and welcomed local radio station 94.9 WMMQ as its new primary media sponsor.

17 years later, the COVID-19 pandemic caused the festival to go virtual.

== See also ==
- List of blues festivals
- List of folk festivals
