= Sea Level (band) =

American rock band (1976–1981)

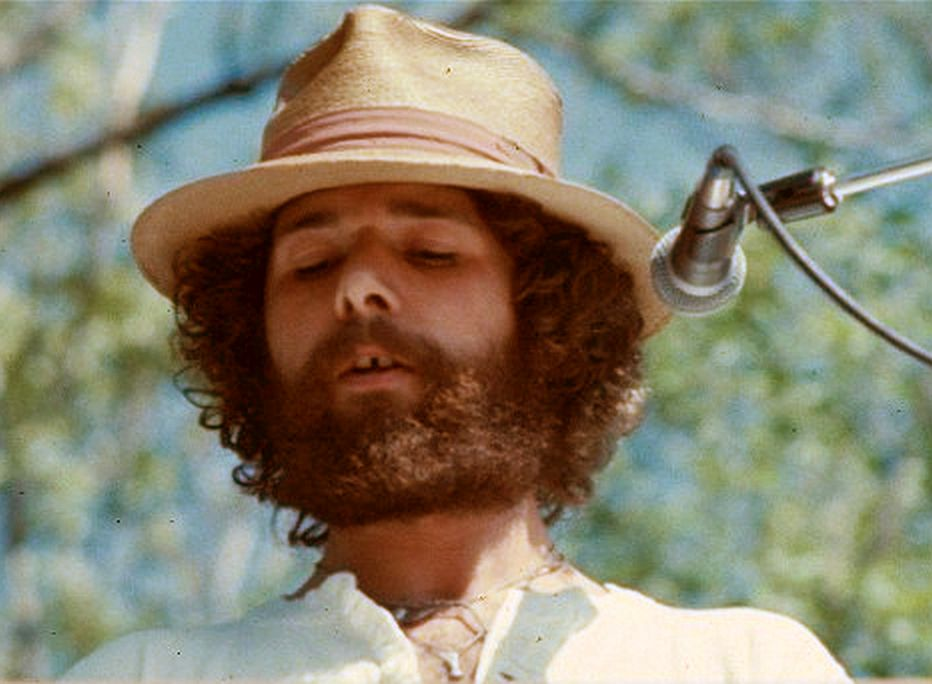
- Chuck Leavell, bandleader and namesake of Sea Level

Background information
- Origin: Macon, Georgia, United States
- Genres: Southern rock; jazz rock
- Years active: 1976–1981
- Labels: Capricorn, Arista
- Spinoff of: The Allman Brothers Band
- Past members: Chuck Leavell; Lamar Williams; Jimmy Nalls; Jai Johanny Johanson; Davis Causey; Randall Bramblett; George Weaver; Joe English; Matt Greeley

Sea Level was an American rock band from Macon, Georgia. Formed in 1976, the band was an offshoot of the Allman Brothers Band. Between 1977 and 1980, the band released five studio albums which incorporated elements of funk, blues and Latin music.

Sea Level took on a life of its own as tensions grew between Gregg Allman and other members resulting in the loss of two of ABBs founding members. After the Allman Brothers Band broke up when Gregg Allman and Dickey Betts left, the remaining members who evolved into Sea Level were "We Three" comprising bassist Lamar Williams, drummer Jaimoe and piano player Chuck Leavell. The trio would occasionally open shows for the group in 1975 and 1976. The trio added guitarist Jimmy Nalls and took their name from the phonetic pun of their new bandleader Chuck Leavell's name: "C. Leavell." They toured relentlessly, experimenting and refining their sound, eventually signing with Capricorn Records (home of the Allman Brothers) and recording their self-titled debut album in 1977.

== Musical style ==
Sea Level's music fuses elements of funk, blues, Latin and rock music. A jam band, Sea Level's sound has been classified as southern rock, jazz rock, and funk pop.

== Career ==
After the release of their first album, the group expanded to a septet with the additions of Davis Causey (guitar), George Weaver (drums, percussion) and Randall Bramblett (saxophones, keyboards and vocals). That configuration recorded the group's second album, Cats on the Coast, in 1978 (with the leadoff track, "That's Your Secret", reaching #50 on the Billboard Hot 100 and #45 in Canada.) By the time of the third album, On the Edge, Jaimoe and Weaver had both left, replaced by Joe English. The sextet of Bramblett, Causey, English, Leavell, Nalls and Williams recorded the fourth album, Long Walk on a Short Pier (1979), unreleased in the United States for nearly twenty years, adding percussionist Matt Greeley for their fifth and final album, Ball Room, issued on Arista in 1980. Their greatest hits album (CD release only) wrapped up their body of work, minus a handful of appearances on various compilation albums (mostly Southern Rock). They were also featured on a live 1978 double compilation album, Hotels, Motels and Road Shows which included an extended version of "Grand Larceny."

== Later years ==
Leavell later emerged as a much sought-after session musician and producer, touring with Eric Clapton and eventually becoming a "permanent" session player touring with the Rolling Stones.

In 1998, he issued his debut solo LP, a Christmas album called What's in That Bag? and more recently Forever Blue that includes solo versions of two classic Sea Level compositions: "Whole Lotta Colada" and "Song for Amy." He also released Southscape, an album of Southern anthems that hearkens back to his Southern roots.

A documentary of Chuck Leavell's career and life outside of music, Chuck Leavell: The Tree Man, premiered on November 6, 2020. The film won the Sedona Film Festival's People's Choice Award.

The film, featuring Mick Jagger, Keith Richards, Charlie Watts, Ronnie Wood, David Gilmore, Dickey Betts, Warren Haynes, John Mayer, Julian Lennon, Billy Bob Thornton, Charlie Daniels, Bonnie Raitt, Bruce Hornsby, Chris Robinson, Miranda Lambert, Eric Church, Mike Mills, Pat Monahan, John Popper, and Lee Ann Womack among others would be available for streaming beginning December 1, 2020. Chuck Leavell: The Tree Man website

== Deaths of members ==
Lamar Williams died from lung cancer on January 21, 1983, at age 34.

Jimmy Nalls, who suffered from Parkinson's disease, died on June 22, 2017, at age 66.

Davis Causey died on February 19, 2023, at the age of 74.

== Group members ==
- Chuck Leavell – piano, Moog synthesizer, organ, clavinet, keyboards, percussion, lead and backing vocals (1976–1980)
- Lamar Williams – bass, backing vocals (1976–1980; died 1983)
- Jimmy Nalls – guitars, backing vocals (1976–1980; died 2017)
- Jaimoe – drums, percussion (1976–1978)
- Davis Causey – guitars, backing vocals (1977–1980; died 2023)
- Randall Bramblett – saxophones, piano, keyboards, lead and backing vocals (1977–1980)
- George Weaver – drums (1977–1978)
- Joe English – drums, percussion, backing and lead vocals (1978–1980)
- Matt Greeley – percussion, backing and lead vocals (1980)

Timeline

== Discography ==
- Sea Level (1977, Capricorn)
- Cats on the Coast (1977, Capricorn)
- On the Edge (1978, Capricorn)
- Long Walk on a Short Pier (1979, Capricorn)
- Ball Room (1980, Arista)
- Best of Sea Level (1990, Polydor)
- Best of Sea Level (1997, Capricorn)
