= The Deep End, Volume 2 =

Studio album by Gov't Mule
- Released: October 8, 2002
- Recorded: The Theater 99, New York, NY; In the Pocket Studio, Forestville, CA; River Sound, New York, NY; Chung King Studios, New York, NY
- Genre: Southern rock, jam rock
- Length: 79:38
- Label: ATO Records
- Producer: Michael Barbiero, Warren Haynes, Les Claypool, John Cutler, Stefani Scamardo

Gov't Mule chronology
The Deep End, Volume 1 (2001)	The Deep End, Volume 2 (2002)	The Deepest End, Live In Concert (2003)

Professional ratings
Review scores
Source	Rating
AllMusic	3/5 stars

The Deep End, Volume 2 is the fifth studio album by the American rock band Gov't Mule. The album was released on October 8, 2002, by ATO Records.

After founding member and bass guitarist Allen Woody died, the band began recording tracks using bass players that Woody had admired. Originally, there was to be one disc, but so many musicians wanted to be part of the sessions that over 160 minutes of music were recorded. At this point, the remaining members, Warren Haynes and Matt Abts, decided to split the project into two releases.

The Deep End, Volume 1 was issued in 2001, and Vol 2 was generally the harder-sounding of the two releases, although it also featured country and jazz tracks. The release also featured a bonus disc, Hidden Treasure, which contained live material, a song remix, and a new studio track recorded after the Deep End sessions had ended.

== Track listing ==
All tracks written by Warren Haynes, except where noted.

The Deep End, Volume 2
No.	Title	Writer(s)	Length
1.	"Trying Not to Fall"	Haynes, Danny Louis	5:30
2.	"Time to Confess"		5:44
3.	"Greasy Granny's Gopher Gravy, Pt. 1"	Haynes, Matt Abts, Les Claypool	3:24
4.	"Greasy Granny's Gopher Gravy, Pt. 2"	Haynes, Abts, Claypool	3:35
5.	"What Is Hip?" (Tower of Power cover)	Stephen Kupka, Emilio Castillo, David Garibaldi	6:23
6.	"World of Confusion"	Haynes, Gary Lucas	5:53
7.	"Hammer and Nails" (The Staple Singers cover)	David Hess, Aaron Schroeder	7:59
8.	"Slow Happy Boys"		6:27
9.	"Sun Dance"	Haynes, Johnny Neel	6:12
10.	"Lay of the Sunflower"	Haynes, Robert Hunter	6:58
11.	"Catfish Blues"	Traditional	7:54
12.	"Which Way Do We Run?"		5:33
13.	"Babylon Turnpike"	Haynes, Neel	8:06
Total length:			79:38

Hidden Treasures
No.	Title	Writer(s)	Length
1.	"Drivin' Rain"		4:10
2.	"Rockin' Horse" (live)	Haynes, Allen Woody, Gregg Allman, Jack Pearson	6:41
3.	"Lay Your Burden Down" (live)	Haynes, Michael Barbiero	5:42
4.	"Sco-Mule" (DJ Logic remix)		3:07
Total length:			19:40

== Personnel ==
Gov't Mule

- Warren Haynes — vocals, guitar
- Matt Abts — drums

Bass players

- Jack Casady ("Slow Happy Boys")
- Les Claypool ("Greasy Granny's Gopher Gravy" Pts. 1 & 2, "Drivin' Rain")
- Billy Cox ("Catfish Blues")
- Alphonso Johnson ("Babylon Turnpike")
- Phil Lesh ("Lay of the Sunflower")
- Tony Levin ("World of Confusion")
- Meshell Ndegeocello ("Hammer and Nails")
- Jason Newsted ("Trying Not to Fall")
- George Porter Jr. ("Time to Confess")
- Rocco Prestia ("What Is Hip?")
- Dave Schools ("Which Way Do We Run?", "Rockin' Horse", "Lay Your Burden Down")
- Chris Squire ("Sun Dance")
- Chris Wood ("Sco-Mule")

Additional musicians

- Rob Barraco — piano ("Lay of the Sunflower")
- David Grisman — mandolin ("Lay of the Sunflower")
- James Hetfield — vocals ("Drivin' Rain")
- Chuck Leavell — organ ("Slow Happy Boys"), keyboards ("Rockin' Horse", "Lay Your Burden Down")
- Danny Louis — Wurlitzer and organ ("Which Way Do We Run?")
- Gary Lucas — guitar ("World of Confusion")
- John Medeski — organ and Wurlitzer ("Hammer and Nails")
- Johnny Neel — organ ("What Is Hip?", "Sun Dance"), piano ("Babylon Turnpike")
- Art Neville — organ ("Time to Confess")
- John Scofield — guitar ("Sco-Mule")
- Pete Sears — piano ("Slow Happy Boys")
- Bernie Worrell — organ ("Catfish Blues"), keyboards ("Sco-Mule")

Production

- Michael Barbiero — production, mixing, engineering
- Warren Haynes — production, mixing
- Les Claypool — production, mixing ("Greasy Granny's Gopher Gravy" Pts. 1 & 2)
- Ron Rigler — engineering ("Greasy Granny's Gopher Gravy" Pts. 1 & 2)
- Ray Martin — engineering ("Hammer and Nails", "Trying Not to Fall")
- John Cutler — production, mixing, engineering ("Lay of the Sunflower")
- Stefani Scamardo — executive producer
- Raeanne Zschokke — assistant engineer at The Theater 99
- Jason Andrews — assistant engineer at In the Pocket Studio
- Phil Burnett — assistant engineer at River Sound
- Halsey Quemere — assistant engineer at Chung King Studios
- Greg Calbi — mastering
- Steve Fallone — editing
