= Rising Low =

- Directed by: Mike Gordon
- Cinematography: Elia Lyssy
- Production company: Cactus Unlimited
- Release date: 2002
- Running time: 88 minutes

Rising Low is a 2002 documentary film directed by Mike Gordon. It is based on the life and death of Gov't Mule bassist Allen Woody and the making of a double-disc tribute album featuring a host of legendary bass players. In the film, Gordon interviews Woody's family and bandmates and discusses the philosophy and technique of bass playing with bassists including Chris Squire, Les Claypool, John Entwistle, Flea, Bootsy Collins, Mike Watt and Roger Glover.

== See also ==
- The Deep End, Volume 1
- The Deep End, Volume 2
