= Mo' Voodoo =

EP by Gov't Mule
- Released: May 16, 2005
- Length: 27:11
- Label: ATO Records

Gov't Mule chronology
Déjà Voodoo (2004)	Mo' Voodoo (2005)	High & Mighty (2006)

Mo' Voodoo is an EP by American rock band Gov't Mule, released in May 2005. It consists of additional material recorded during breaks of the band's last tour. It is now included as a bonus CD of the Deja Voodoo album.

== Track listing ==
1. "King's Highway" (Joe Henry) – 4:54
2. "I'll Be the One" (Haynes) – 6:00
3. "My Oh My" (David Gray/Craig McClune) – 5:07
4. "I Can't Be You" (Haynes) – 4:33
5. "Ballerina" (Van Morrison) – 6:32

Total runtime: 27:11

== Personnel ==
- Warren Haynes – vocals, guitar
- Matt Abts – drums
- Danny Louis – keyboards
- Andy Hess – bass
- Michael Barbiero – production
