= The Deepest End, Live in Concert =

Live album by Gov't Mule
- Released: October 7, 2003
- Recorded: May 3, 2003
- Genre: Southern rock, blues rock, jam rock
- Length: 2:33:52
- Label: ATO Records
- Producer: Chris Tetzeli, Warren Haynes

Gov't Mule chronology
The Deep End, Volume 2 (2002)	The Deepest End, Live in Concert (2003)	Deja Voodoo (2004)

Professional ratings
Review scores
Source	Rating
AllMusic	4.5/5 stars

The Deepest End, Live in Concert is a two-CD live album and DVD video by American southern rock band Gov't Mule, released on October 7, 2003. It was recorded in New Orleans on May 3, 2003.

In 2003, after recording The Deep End, Volume 1 (2001) and Volume 2 (2002), Gov't Mule gathered several musicians that had worked on the Deep End sessions as well as a few other friends for a live concert. This was intended as the culmination of the Deep End project, which was a tribute to their late bassist Allen Woody, who died in 2000.
The release also marked the first Gov't Mule CD to feature keyboardist Danny Louis as a full-time member.

The album is one of the 10 best "live jam releases of this century" according to the August 2006 issue of Guitar One magazine.

== Track listing ==
All tracks are written by Warren Haynes, except where noted

Disc one
No.	Title	Writer(s)	Guest artists	Length
1.	"Bad Little Doggie"	Haynes; Allen Woody; Matt Abts	Greg Rzab	4:04
2.	"Game Face"		Rzab	8:36
3.	"Larger Than Life"		Rzab	6:11
4.	"Blind Man in the Dark"		Karl Denson; Dave Schools	15:38
5.	"Which Way Do We Run?"		Schools	6:56
6.	"Fool's Moon"		Schools	6:11
7.	"Sco-Mule"		Victor Wooten; Bernie Worrell	8:56
8.	"Patchwork Quilt"		Béla Fleck; Wooten	6:06
9.	"Lay of the Sunflower"	Haynes; Robert Hunter	Fleck; Rob Wasserman	7:35
10.	"John the Revelator"	Traditional	Kevin Harris; Roger Lewis; Julius McKee; Efrem Towns; Sammie Williams	6:59

Disc two
No.	Title	Writer(s)	Guest artists	Length
11.	"When Doves Cry/Beautifully Broken"	Prince; Haynes; Danny Louis	George Porter Jr.	9:49
12.	"Time to Confess"		Porter	8:27
13.	"Banks of the Deep End"	Haynes; Mike Gordon; Joseph Linitz	Gordon	6:45
14.	"32/20 Blues"	Robert Johnson	Denson; Sonny Landreth; Will Lee	12:10
15.	"Goin' Down"	Don Nix	Roger Glover	5:58
16.	"Slow Happy Boys"		Jack Casady	7:29
17.	"I Shall Return"		David Hidalgo; Conrad Lozano	7:29
18.	"Trying Not to Fall"	Haynes; Louis	Jason Newsted	5:48
19.	"Drivin' Rain"		Les Claypool	5:03
20.	"Soulshine"		Schools	7:41

DVD
No.	Title	Writer(s)	Guest artists	Length
1.	"Bad Little Doggie"	Haynes; Woody; Abts	Rzab	4:04
2.	"Blind Man in the Dark"		Denson; Schools	15:38
3.	"Sco-Mule"		Wooten; Worrell	8:56
4.	"Lay of the Sunflower"	Haynes; Hunter	Fleck; Wasserman	7:35
5.	"John the Revelator"	Traditional	Harris; Lewis; McKee; Towns; Williams	6:59
6.	"Chameleon"	Herbie Hancock; Paul Jackson, Jr.; Harvey Mason; Bennie Maupin	Jackson; Worrell; Harris; Lewis; McKee; Towns; Williams	16:25
7.	"When Doves Cry/Beautifully Broken"	Prince; Haynes; Louis	Porter	9:49
8.	"Mule"	Haynes; Woody; Abts	Porter	13:41
9.	"Banks of the Deep End"	Haynes; Gordon; Linitz	Gordon	6:45
10.	"On Your Way Down"	Allen Toussaint	Gordon; Landreth	8:48
11.	"Down and Out in NYC"	Bodie Chandler; Barry De Vorzon	Lee; Denson; Fred Wesley	7:36
12.	"Maybe I'm a Leo"	Ritchie Blackmore; Ian Gillan; Roger Glover; Jon Lord; Ian Paice	Glover	5:45
13.	"Voodoo Chile"	Jimi Hendrix	Casady; Ivan Neville	14:33
14.	"Politician"	Jack Bruce; Pete Brown	Hidalgo; Lozano	6:50
15.	"Guitar Solo - Drum Solo"	Haynes; Abts		8:18
16.	"Sweet Leaf"	Tony Iommi; Ozzy Osbourne; Geezer Butler; Bill Ward	Newsted	5:04
17.	"War Pigs"	Iommi; Osborne; Butler; Ward	Newsted	12:06
18.	"Greasy Granny's Gopher Gravy, Pts. 1 & 2"	Haynes; Claypool; Abts	Claypool	12:01
19.	"Wasted Time"	Don Henley; Glenn Frey		5:50
20.	"Thorazine Shuffle"	Haynes; Abts	Newsted; Porter; Schools	11:39

== Personnel ==
=== Gov't Mule ===
- Warren Haynes - vocals, guitar, audio production
- Matt Abts - drums
- Danny Louis - keyboards, guitar

=== Bassists ===
- Jack Casady
- Les Claypool
- Jason Newsted
- George Porter Jr.
- Dave Schools
- Roger Glover
- Mike Gordon
- Paul Jackson
- Conrad Lozano
- Will Lee
- Greg Rzab
- Rob Wasserman
- Victor Wooten

=== Additional personnel ===
- Michael Barbiero - mixing
- Michael Drumm - directing and video production
- Karl Denson - horns
- Dirty Dozen Brass Band horn section
- Béla Fleck - banjo
- David Hidalgo - vocals, guitar
- Sonny Landreth - guitar
- Ivan Neville - keyboards
- Fred Wesley - trombone
- Bernie Worrell - keyboards
