= Live... With a Little Help from Our Friends =

Live album by Gov't Mule
- Released: November 16, 1999
- Recorded: December 31, 1998
- Genre: Blues; rock and roll
- Length: 247:24 / 141:51 / 49:57
- Label: Capricorn
- Producer: Gov't Mule

Gov't Mule chronology
Dose (1998)	Live... With a Little Help from Our Friends (1999)	Life Before Insanity (2000)

Professional ratings
Review scores
Source	Rating
Allmusic	4/5 stars

Live... With a Little Help from Our Friends is a live recording of Gov't Mule's 1998 New Year's Eve concert at The Roxy in Atlanta, Georgia. It was released as a 4-CD set Collector's Edition and as two separate albums.

== Track listing ==
=== Live... With a Little Help From Our Friends Collector's Edition ===
==== Disc One ====
1. "Wandering Child" (Haynes/Abts) – 7:45
2. "Thorazine Shuffle" (Haynes/Abts) – 9:02
3. "No Need to Suffer" (Haynes) – 8:12
4. "Dolphineus" (Haynes/Woody/Abts) – 1:22
5. "War Pigs" (Iommi/Osbourne/Butler/Ward) – 8:24
6. "30 Days in the Hole" (Marriott) – 6:32
7. "Mr. Big" (Rodgers/Fraser/Kirke/Kossoff) – 8:07
8. "The Hunter" (Jones/Wells/Jackson/Dunn/Cropper) – 8:34

==== Disc Two ====
1. "Gambler's Roll" (Haynes/ Neel) – 13:46 *
2. "Look on Yonder Wall" (James/Sehorn) – 10:40
3. "32-20 Blues" (Johnson) – 9:36 *
4. "I Shall Return" (Haynes) – 9:36 *
5. "Soulshine" (Haynes) – 9:19
6. "Mule" (Haynes/Woody/Abts) – 17:35

==== Disc Three ====
1. "Spanish Moon" (George) – 20:10
2. "Sad and Deep as You" (Mason) – 13:56
3. "Third Stone from the Sun" (Hendrix) – 16:57 *
4. "Devil Likes It Slow" (Haynes) – 10:38
5. "Cortez the Killer" (Young) – 14:13

==== Disc Four ====
1. "Afro-Blue" (Santamaria) – 29:30
2. "Pygmy Twylyte" (Zappa) – 5:16 [Studio Outtake]

* on the Collector's Edition only

=== Live... With A Little Help From Our Friends ===
==== Disc One ====
1. "Thorazine Shuffle" (Haynes/Abts) – 9:02
2. "Dolphineus" (Haynes/Woody/Abts) – 1:22
3. "War Pigs" (Iommi/Osborne/Butler/Ward) – 8:24
4. "30 Days in the Hole" (Marriott) – 6:32
5. "Mr. Big" (Rodgers/Fraser/Kirke/Kossoff) – 8:07
6. "Look on Yonder Wall" (James/Sehorn) – 10:40
7. "Soulshine" (Haynes) – 9:19
8. "Mule" (Haynes/Woody/Abts) – 17:35

==== Disc Two ====
1. "Sad and Deep as You" (Mason) – 13:56
2. "Devil Likes It Slow" (Haynes) – 10:38
3. "Cortez the Killer" (Young) – 14:13
4. "Afro-Blue" (Santamaria) – 29:30

=== Live... With A Little Help From Our Friends Volume 2 ===
1. "Wandering Child" (Haynes/Abts) – 7:45
2. "No Need to Suffer" (Haynes) – 8:12
3. "The Hunter" (Jones/Wells/Jackson/Dunn/Cropper) – 8:34
4. "Spanish Moon" (George) – 20:10
5. "Pygmy Twylyte" (Zappa) – 5:16 [Bonus Track]

== Personnel ==
=== Gov't Mule ===
- Warren Haynes – vocals, guitar
- Matt Abts – drums
- Allen Woody – bass

=== Additional Personnel ===
- Michael Barbiero – mixing. production
- Kirk West – vocal introduction on "Wandering Child"
- Marc Ford – guitar, vocals
- Chuck Leavell – piano
- Derek Trucks – guitar
- Bernie Worrell – organ
- Yonrico Scott – percussion
- Randall Bramblett – saxophone
- Jimmy Herring – guitar
