= The Tel-Star Sessions =

Demo album by Gov't Mule
- Released: August 5, 2016
- Recorded: 1994
- Studio: Tel-Star, Bradenton, Florida
- Genre: Blues rock
- Length: 61:20
- Label: Evil Teen

Gov't Mule chronology
Stoned Side of the Mule Vol. 1 & 2 (2015)	The Tel-Star Sessions (2016)	Revolution Come...Revolution Go (2017)

The Tel-Star Sessions is a demo album by American band Gov't Mule, released on August 5, 2016, through Evil Teen Records. It includes their 1994 demos recorded at Tel-Star Studios in Bradenton, Florida, with Bud Snyder serving as engineer. Seven of the 10 tracks were re-recorded for the band's debut album, 1995's Gov't Mule.

== Critical reception ==
Professional ratings
Review scores
Source	Rating
AllMusic	4/5 stars
PopMatters	7/10

Thom Jurek of AllMusic wrote that the recordings "represent what [Gov't Mule] single-handedly pulled off in grand style from the very beginning: Reinvigorating the classic blues-rock power trio à la Cream, Mountain, Hot Tuna, ZZ Top, and Taste". Jurek also called it a "stunning tribute to [Allen] Woody's genius" and "among Gov't Mule's most essential recorded documents. The power and musicality on display here rival anything they've released." A staff reviewer at PopMatters called the album a demonstration that Gov't Mule "arrived with the passion and fire that would characterize the group's style and sound for 20 years to come" and superior to the recordings on the band's 1995 debut as well as "many subsequent Mule releases" as they have "neither the innocence nor energy heard here".

== Track listing ==
The Tel-Star Sessions track listing
No.	Title	Length
1.	"Blind Man in the Dark"	6:49
2.	"Rocking Horse"	4:31
3.	"Monkey Hill"	4:31
4.	"Mr. Big" (cover of Free)	6:17
5.	"The Same Thing" (cover of Willie Dixon)	7:13
6.	"Mother Earth" (cover of Memphis Slim)	7:00
7.	"Just Got Paid" (cover of ZZ Top)	4:22
8.	"Left Coast Groovies"	6:39
9.	"World of Difference"	7:17
10.	"World of Difference" (alternative version/original mix)	6:41
Total length:		61:20

== Charts ==
Chart performance for The Tel-Star Sessions
Chart (2016)	Peak position
Austrian Albums (Ö3 Austria)	28
Belgian Albums (Ultratop Wallonia)	91
Dutch Albums (Album Top 100)	93
French Albums (SNEP)	145
German Albums (Offizielle Top 100)	24
Swiss Albums (Schweizer Hitparade)	35
US Billboard 200	104
US Independent Albums (Billboard)	6
US Top Rock Albums (Billboard)	11
US Indie Store Album Sales (Billboard)	3
