= Peace... Like a River =

Studio album by Gov't Mule
- Released: June 16, 2023
- Recorded: 2021
- Studio: Buck Jump Studios; Eusonia Studios; Foster Fonic Studios; Lucy's Meat Market; Peppertree Hill Studio; Power Station New England, Waterford, Connecticut, United States
- Length: 76:24
- Language: English
- Label: Fantasy
- Producer: Warren Haynes; John Paterno

Gov't Mule chronology
Heavy Load Blues (2021)	Peace... Like a River (2023)

Peace... Like a River is the thirteenth studio album by American rock band Gov't Mule, released through Fantasy Records on June 16, 2023.

== Reception ==
Editors at AllMusic rated this album 3.5 out of 5 stars, with critic Thom Jurek writing that this release sounds completely different to the band's previous effort Heavy Load Blues, but acts as a complement to it, calling this album "a labyrinthine trek through original songs that nod at the band's classic rock influences". In Glide Magazine, Doug Collette notes diverse musical influences, such as power trio Cream and the complex production of The Beatles. Hugh Fielder of Louder Sound rated this album 4 out of 5 stars, emphasizing the guitar work and writing that "the guitar riff on the opening 'Same as It Ever Was' is perhaps the most melodic that Warren Haynes has come up with". Michael Elliott of No Depression notes the musical influences displayed on this release, such as Led Zeppelin and Sly & the Family Stone, and recommends the album as well as the bonus EP on the compact disc edition, Time of the Signs. Rob Smith of Ultimate Classic Rock calls this "a welcome addition" to the band's discography.

Editors at AllMusic included this on their list of favorite blues albums of 2023.

== Track listing ==
1. "Same As It Ever Was" – 6:44
2. "Shake Our Way Out" – 6:23
3. "Made My Peace" – 9:07
4. "Peace I Need" – 7:21
5. "Your Only Friend" – 5:59
6. "Dreaming Out Loud" – 4:38
7. "Head Full of Thunder" – 4:35
8. "The River Only Flows One Way" – 7:21
9. "After the Storm" – 6:24
10. "Just Across the River" – 5:18
11. "Long Time Coming" – 5:19
12. "Gone Too Long" – 7:15

Time of the Signs bonus EP

1. "Stumblebum" – 6:08
2. "Under the Tent" – 5:25
3. "Time Stands Still" – 5:27
4. "Blue, Blue Wind" – 6:49
5. "The River Only Flows One Way" (WH Vocal) – 7:21

== Personnel ==
Gov't Mule

- Matt Abts – drums, percussion, vocals
- Jorgen Carlsson – bass guitar, percussion, string arrangement, backing vocals on "Gone Too Long", 12-string acoustic guitar on "Under the Tent"
- Warren Haynes – guitar, vocals, string arrangement, production
- Danny Louis – keyboards, guitar, trumpet, trombone, backing vocals, orchestration, string arrangement, programming

Additional musicians

- Bobby Allende – percussion on "Dreaming Out Loud", "The River Only Flows One Way", "Just Across the River", and "Long Time Coming"
- Mechelle Dudley – backing vocals on "Just Across the River" and "Time Stands Still"
- Pam Fleming – trumpet on "Dreaming Out Loud" and "Long Time Coming"
- Celisse Henderson – guitar and vocals on "Just Across the River"
- Jenny Hill – saxophone on "Dreaming Out Loud" and "Long Time Coming"
- Ruthie Foster – vocals on "Dreaming Out Loud"
- Billy Gibbons – guitar and vocals on "Shake Our Way Out"
- Ivan Neville – vocals on "Dreaming Out Loud"
- John Paterno – percussion on "Just Across the River", engineering, mixing, production
- Kymberli Joyce Rush – backing vocals on "Just Across the River" and "Time Stands Still"
- Buford O'Sullivan – trombone on "Dreaming Out Loud" and "Long Time Coming"
- Billy Bob Thornton – vocals on "The River Only Flows One Way"

Technical personnel

- Jacob Blickenstaff – photography
- Rich Borge – illustration
- Greg Calbi – mastering at Sterling Sound
- Steve Fallone – mastering at Sterling Sound
- McLee Matthias – engineering
- Jay Sansone – photography
- Stefani Scamardo – executive production
- Tommy Steele – design

== Chart performance ==
Chart performance for Peace... Like a River
Chart	Peak	Duration (weeks)
Austrian Albums (Ö3 Austria)	20	1
Belgian Albums (Ultratop Flanders)	95	1
Belgian Albums (Ultratop Wallonia)	154	1
French Albums (SNEP)	140	1
German Albums (Offizielle Top 100)	12	1
Scottish Albums (OCC)	40	1
Swiss Albums (Schweizer Hitparade)	8	1

== See also ==
- List of 2023 albums
