= The Deep End, Volume 1 =

Studio album by Gov't Mule
- Released: October 23, 2001
- Recorded: The Theater 99, New York City; Sunset Sound, Hollywood, CA; Fantasy Studios, Berkeley, CA; Water Music, Hoboken, NJ
- Genre: Southern rock
- Length: 79:39
- Labels: ATO, Evangeline
- Producers: Michael Barbiero, Warren Haynes, John Cutler, David Z, Stefani Scamardo

Gov't Mule chronology
Life Before Insanity (2000)	The Deep End, Volume 1 (2001)	The Deep End, Volume 2 (2002)

Professional ratings
Review scores
Source	Rating
AllMusic	4.5/5 stars

The Deep End, Volume 1 is the fourth studio album by American rock band Gov't Mule. It was released on October 23, 2001, by ATO Records and Evangeline Records.

After the death of founding member and bass guitarist Allen Woody, the band considered breaking up. Instead, remaining members Warren Haynes and Matt Abts recorded several songs with bass players Woody had admired. So many musicians wanted to participate that the band ended up recording two albums worth of material. Woody himself is posthumously featured on a cover of Grand Funk Railroad's "Sin's a Good Man's Brother".

Volume 1 was issued in 2001. Originally, The Deep End, Volume 1 was released with a bonus disc called Hidden Treasures which featured live performances by the "New School of Gov't Mule" (Haynes, Abts, bassist Dave Schools, and keyboardist Chuck Leavell).

The Deep End, Volume 2 was released a year later, featuring a somewhat heavier sound.

"Sco-Mule" was nominated for the Grammy Award for Best Rock Instrumental Performance in 2003.

== Track listing ==
All tracks written by Warren Haynes, except where noted.

The Deep End, Volume 1
No.	Title	Writer(s)	Length
1.	"Fool's Moon"		5:52
2.	"Life on the Outside"	Haynes, Audley Freed	3:47
3.	"Banks of the Deep End"	Haynes, Mike Gordon, Joseph Linitz	5:56
4.	"Down and Out in New York City" (James Brown cover)	Bodie Chandler, Barry De Vorzon	6:12
5.	"Effigy" (Creedence Clearwater Revival cover)	John Fogerty	9:06
6.	"Maybe I'm a Leo" (Deep Purple cover)	Ritchie Blackmore, Ian Gillan, Roger Glover, Jon Lord, Ian Paice	6:07
7.	"Same Price"		3:36
8.	"Soulshine" (The Allman Brothers Band cover)		7:47
9.	"Sco-Mule"		6:10
10.	"Worried Down with the Blues"	Haynes, Allen Woody, John Jaworowicz	8:43
11.	"Beautifully Broken"	Haynes, Danny Louis	6:01
12.	"Tear Me Down"		6:10
13.	"Sin's a Good Man's Brother" (Grand Funk Railroad cover)	Mark Farner	4:12

Hidden Treasures
No.	Title	Writer(s)	Length
1.	"Blind Man in the Dark" (live)		7:07
2.	"Fallen Down" (live)		13:31
3.	"Jesus Just Left Chicago" (ZZ Top cover, live)	Frank Beard, Billy Gibbons, Dusty Hill	10:02
4.	"Soulshine" (The Allman Brothers Band cover, acoustic version)		4:59

== Personnel ==
=== Band ===
- Warren Haynes – vocals, guitar
- Matt Abts – drums

=== Bass players ===
- Allen Woody ("Sin's a Good Man's Brother")
- Jack Bruce ("Fool's Moon")
- Oteil Burbridge ("Worried Down With the Blues")
- Bootsy Collins ("Tear Me Down")
- John Entwistle ("Same Price")
- Flea ("Down and Out in New York City")
- Roger Glover ("Maybe I'm a Leo")
- Mike Gordon ("Banks of the Deep End", "Jesus Just Left Chicago")
- Larry Graham ("Life on the Outside")
- Stefan Lessard ("Beautifully Broken")
- Dave Schools ("Blind Man in the Dark", "Fallen Down")
- Mike Watt ("Effigy")
- Willie Weeks ("Soulshine")
- Chris Wood ("Sco-Mule")

=== Additional musicians ===
- Gregg Allman – vocals, keyboards ("Worried Down With the Blues")
- Rob Barraco – organ and Wurlitzer ("Down and Out in New York City")
- Keith Barry – tenor sax ("Down and Out in New York City")
- Randall Bramblett – organ ("Maybe I'm a Leo")
- Jerry Cantrell – vocals ("Effigy")
- Audley Freed – guitar ("Life on the Outside")
- Eddie Harsch – keyboards and organ ("Life on the Outside")
- Chuck Leavell – organ and Wurlitzer ("Soulshine", "Blind Man in the Dark", "Fallen Down")
- Little Milton – guitar, vocals ("Soulshine")
- Danny Louis – organ and Wurlitzer ("Banks of the Deep End", "Beautifully Broken")
- Page McConnell – organ, Wurlitzer and synthesizer ("Same Price", "Jesus Just Left Chicago")
- John Scofield – guitar ("Sco-Mule")
- Derek Trucks – slide guitar ("Worried Down With the Blues")
- Mike Uhler – trumpet ("Down and Out in New York City")
- Dan Weinstein – trombone ("Down and Out in New York City")
- Bernie Worrell – organ, clavinet and Mini Moog ("Fool's Moon", "Sco-Mule", "Tear Me Down")
- Tim Reynolds – guitar ("Soulshine")
- Larry McCray – vocals guitar (“Soulshine”)

=== Production ===
- Michael Barbiero – production, mixing, engineering
- Warren Haynes – production, mixing
- John Cutler – production, engineering ("Banks of the Deep End")
- David Z – production, mixing, engineering ("Down and Out in New York City", "Effigy", "Tear Me Down")
- Ray Martin – engineering, mixing ("Sco-Mule")
- Stefani Scamardo – executive producer
- Raeanne Zschokke – assistant engineer at The Theater 99
- Greg Griffith – assistant engineer on "Banks of the Deep End" (at The Theater 99)
- Jeff Hoffman – second assistant engineer at The Theater 99
- Ryan Castle – assistant engineer at Sunset Sound
- Michael Rosen – assistant engineer at Fantasy Studios
- Dan Jurow – assistant engineer at Water Music
- Greg Calbi – mastering
- Steve Fallone – editing
