= Mighty High =

Studio album by Gov't Mule
- Released: October 16, 2007
- Genre: Reggae; dub
- Length: 60:06
- Label: ATO Records

Gov't Mule chronology
High & Mighty (2006)	Mighty High (2007)	By a Thread (2009)

Mighty High is the eighth studio album by southern rock jam band Gov't Mule. The album was released on October 16, 2007, by ATO Records. Mighty High features reggae and dub versions of classic Mule covers and originals with special guest appearances by reggae legends Michael Franti, Toots Hibbert, and Willi Williams. Most tracks on Mighty High were recorded in the studio but a few of the songs are remixed dubstyle from live recordings at the Beacon Theatre, Bonnaroo, and Mountain Jam.

== Track listing ==
No.	Title	Length
1.	"I'm a Ram"	7:41
2.	"Rebel with a Cause" (featuring Willi Williams)	4:28
3.	"Horseflies"	4:14
4.	"The Shape I'm In"	7:48
5.	"Play with Fire" (featuring Michael Franti)	7:32
6.	"Hard to Handle" (featuring Toots Hibbert)	4:10
7.	"Hard to Dubya"	3:46
8.	"Unblow Your Horn"	4:41
9.	"Unthrow That Spear" (featuring Michael Franti)	2:32
10.	"So Ram, So Strong"	5:11
11.	"Outta Shape"	4:38
12.	"Reblow Your Mind"	4:43
13.	"Plasticine Era" (featuring Willi Williams)	5:21

== Personnel ==
- Warren Haynes - guitar, vocals, production
- Matt Abts - drums, percussion
- Danny Louis - keyboards, guitar, background vocals
- Pamela Fleming - trumpet
- Andy Hess - bass
- Gordie Johnson - production, mixing, guitar
