= Dose (Gov't Mule album) =

Studio album by Gov't Mule
- Released: February 24, 1998
- Length: 65:21
- Label: Capricorn, later Volcano
- Producer: Michael Barbiero

Gov't Mule chronology
Live at Roseland Ballroom (1996)	Dose (1998)	Live... With a Little Help from Our Friends (1999)

Professional ratings
Review scores
Source	Rating
AllMusic	4/5 stars

Dose is the second studio album by American rock band Gov't Mule. It was released on February 24, 1998, by Capricorn Records and (on vinyl) by Evil Teen Records. It was produced, recorded and mixed by Michael Barbiero and is a much darker record than Gov't Mule's self-titled debut album. The songs "Thelonius Beck" and "Birth of the Mule" were tributes to jazz musicians Thelonious Monk and Miles Davis, respectively, whereas the subtitle "Beck" refers to Jeff Beck, who also recorded a song named "Thelonius".

== Track listing ==
All songs written by Warren Haynes unless otherwise noted.

No.	Title	Writer(s)	Length
1.	"Blind Man in the Dark"		6:47
2.	"Thorazine Shuffle"	Haynes; Matt Abts	6:46
3.	"Thelonius Beck"		3:33
4.	"Game Face"		7:55
5.	"Towering Fool"	Haynes; Abts	6:22
6.	"Birth of the Mule"	Haynes; Allen Woody; Abts	6:41
7.	"John the Revelator"	Traditional	3:49
8.	"She Said She Said"	Lennon–McCartney	6:57
9.	"Larger Than Life"		5:13
10.	"Raven Black Night"		5:29
11.	"I Shall Return"		5:40

Bonus track
No.	Title	Writer(s)	Length
12.	"I Put a Spell on You"	Screamin' Jay Hawkins	5:05

The bonus track appears on the limited edition vinyl version released by Evil Teen Records. It's an acoustic version recorded at Outback Lodge, Charlottesville, in May 1998.

== Personnel ==
- Warren Haynes – vocals, guitar, percussion
- Matt Abts – drums, percussion
- Allen Woody – bass, mandolin
- Michael Barbiero – production, tambourine on "John the Revelator"
