= Live at Roseland Ballroom =

Live album by Gov't Mule
- Released: October 22, 1996
- Recorded: December 31, 1995
- Length: 56:24
- Label: Foundation

Gov't Mule chronology
Gov't Mule (1995)	Live at Roseland Ballroom (1996)	Dose (1998)

Professional ratings
Review scores
Source	Rating
AllMusic	4/5 stars

Live at Roseland Ballroom is the first live album by American jam band Gov't Mule. It was taken from their performance on New Year's Eve 1995, opening for Blues Traveler. It was recorded at the Roseland Ballroom in Manhattan, New York City.

The album was out of print for over a decade and used CD copies sold for over US$30 on Amazon.com at one point. The album was reissued in 2007 on Evil Teen Records, the record label of Warren Haynes and his wife/manager Stephanie Scarmado. The reissue featured a cover of "Voodoo Chile" recorded after the death of bassist Allen Woody. In the reissue's liner notes, Haynes relates that he chose to include this track, rather than a track featuring the original lineup with Woody, due to the audio quality of the recordings available to him at the time.

== Track listing ==
1. "Trane" (Haynes/Woody/Abts) - 16:35
2. "Temporary Saint" (Haynes) - 5:50
3. "Painted Silver Light" (Haynes) - 7:11
4. "Don't Step on the Grass, Sam" (Kay) - 8:06
5. "Kind of Bird" (Haynes/Betts) - 9:45
6. "Mule" (Haynes/Woody/Abts) - 8:56

=== Bonus track (2007 reissue) ===
1. "Voodoo Chile" (Hendrix) - 15:35 (recorded October 18, 2001, with Jack Casady on bass and Chuck Leavell on organ.)
