= Life Before Insanity =

Studio album by Gov't Mule
- Released: February 15, 2000
- Recorded: Muscle Shoals Studios, Sheffield, AL and Water Music, Hoboken, NJ
- Genre: Blues rock
- Length: 73:50
- Label: Capricorn
- Producer: Michael Barbiero

Gov't Mule chronology
Live... With a Little Help from Our Friends (1999)	Life Before Insanity (2000)	The Deep End, Volume 1 (2001)

Professional ratings
Review scores
Source	Rating
AllMusic	4/5 stars
The Atlanta Constitution	B
Dayton Daily News	B−
The Encyclopedia of Popular Music	3/5 stars
The New Rolling Stone Album Guide	3.5/5 stars
Spin	6/10

Life Before Insanity is the third studio album by Gov't Mule. The album was released on February 15, 2000, by Capricorn Records.

The album peaked at No. 16 on the Billboard Heatseekers Album Chart.

== Production ==
The album was produced by Michael Barbiero. Unlike the band's first two albums, Life Before Insanity utilized both overdubbing and multiple guest musicians. It was the last album recorded with founding member Allen Woody, who died in August 2000.

== Critical reception ==
The Austin Chronicle wrote that "having Ben Harper cameo with Haynes on 'Lay Your Burden Down' is a guitarist's dream, but while the song rolls along, it never takes off—never reaches the pairing's potential." The Washington Post thought that the album "recalls the vintage blues-rock of the early Allman Brothers Band and Clapton's Cream."

== Track listing ==
All songs by Warren Haynes unless otherwise noted.

No.	Title	Length
1.	"Wandering Child" (Haynes, Matt Abts)	6:05
2.	"Life Before Insanity" (Haynes, Danny Louis)	6:12
3.	"Bad Little Doggie" (Haynes, Abts, Allen Woody)	3:48
4.	"Lay Your Burden Down" (Haynes, Michael Barbiero)	5:27
5.	"Fallen Down"	6:58
6.	"World Gone Wild"	6:17
7.	"Tastes Like Wine"	6:57
8.	"I Think You Know What I Mean"	4:55
9.	"Far Away"	5:54
10.	"No Need to Suffer"	8:20
11.	"In My Life/If I Had Possession Over Judgement Day" (Haynes, Robert Johnson)	12:48

== Personnel ==
- Warren Haynes – guitar, slide guitar, vocals
- Allen Woody – bass, mandolin on "Life Before Insanity", electric upright bass on "Tastes Like Wine", rhythm guitar on "I Think You Know What I Mean", fretless bass on "Far Away", dulcitar on "In My Life"
- Matt Abts – drums, djembe, ashika on "In My Life"

=== Additional personnel ===
- Michael Barbiero – glockenspiel on "Far Away"
- Hook Herrera – harmonica on "Bad Little Doggie" and "I Think You Know What I Mean"
- Ben Harper – vocals and lap steel on "Lay Your Burden Down"
- Johnny Neel – organ, Wurlitzer piano and background vocals

=== Production ===
- Michael Barbiero – producer, engineer, mixing
- Ray Martin – mixing, additional engineering
- Warren Haynes – mixing
- Brodie Hutcheson – mixing, additional engineering
- Dan Jurow – additional engineering
- Greg Calbi – mastering
- Mark Pagliaro – guitar, bass, mandolin, amp, tech
- Daniel Saratec – drum, percussion tech
