= Johnny Neel =

American vocalist (1954–2024)

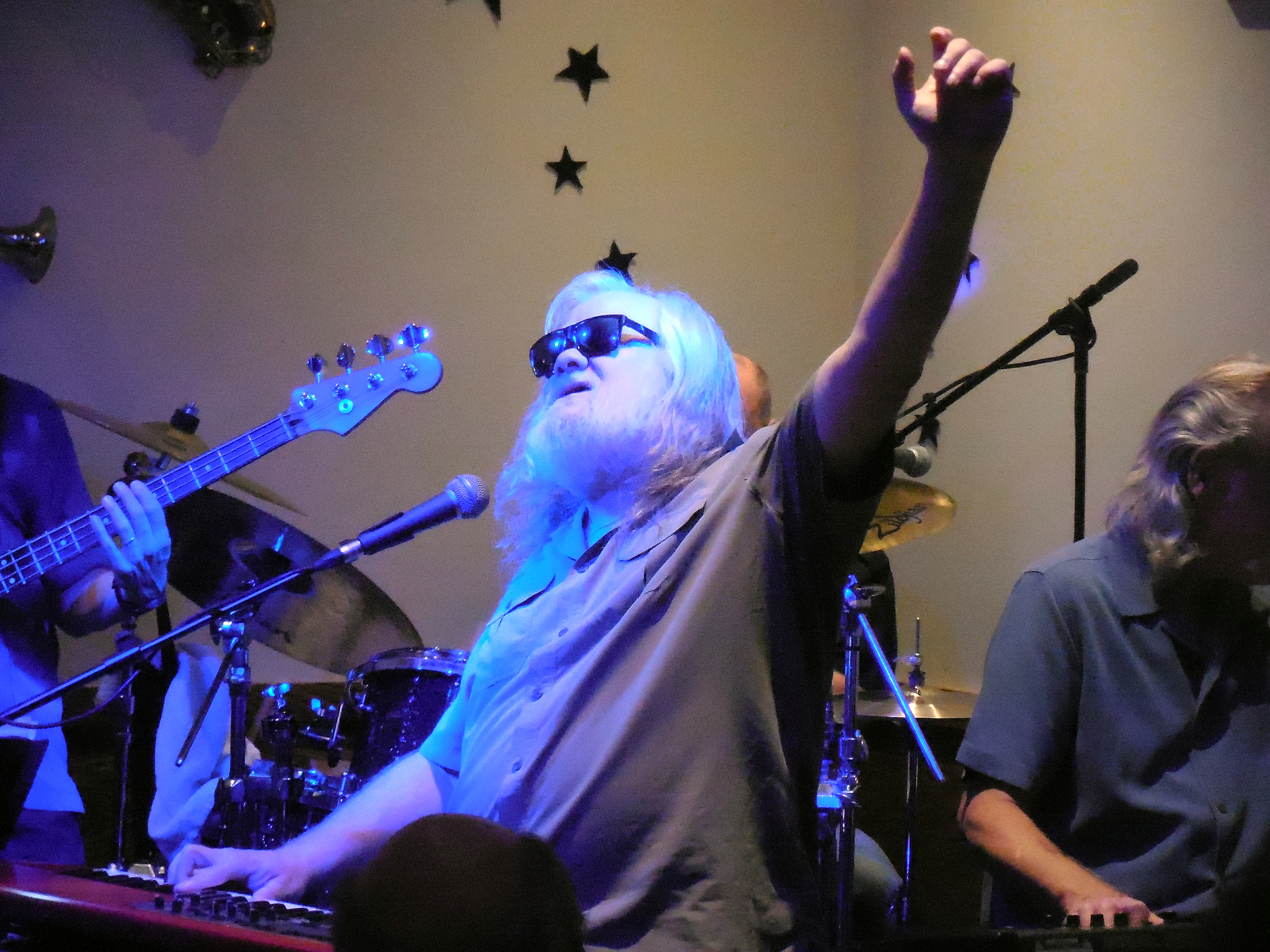
- Neel performing in 2016

Background information
- Born: June 11, 1954; Wilmington, Delaware, U.S.
- Died: October 6, 2024 (aged 70) Nashville, Tennessee
- Genres: Blues; rock; jazz
- Occupations: Musician; vocalist; songwriter
- Instruments: Vocals; keyboards; harmonica
- Years active: 1966–2024
- Labels: Breaking Records; Silverwolf Records
- Formerly of: Allman Brothers; Dickey Betts Band; The Grease Factor; Deep Fried; X²; The Criminal Element

Johnny Neel (June 11, 1954 – October 6, 2024) was an American vocalist, songwriter, and musician based in Nashville, Tennessee. He is best known for his songwriting, his work as a session musician, and being a member of the Allman Brothers Band and the Dickey Betts Band.

As a songwriter, in addition to the material written, or co-written for the Allman Brothers, Gregg Allman, and Dickey Betts, Neel's songs have also been recorded by Gov't Mule, John Mayall, Delbert McClinton, Montgomery Gentry, Keith Whitley, Travis Tritt, The Oak Ridge Boys, Restless Heart, Ann Peebles, Dorothy Moore, and John Schneider.

As a studio musician, Neel appeared on recordings by The Allman Brothers, Gov't Mule, Warren Haynes, Dickey Betts, Montgomery Gentry, Michael McDonald, Todd Snider,Iggy Taylor, David Allan Coe, Jeff Coffin, Robert Gordon, Chris LeDoux, Tiny Town, Suzy Bogguss, Joe Diffie, Collin Raye, and Pirates of the Mississippi.

== Biography ==
Neel was born in Wilmington, Delaware, on June 11, 1954. He became blind shortly after birth due to complications related to being born premature. He was drawn to music at a young age and started playing the bongos before he started school. While attending a school for the blind, he began playing piano and fell in love with the instrument. He cut his first single, entitled "Talking About People", at the age of twelve, as Johnny Neel and The Shapes Of Soul, which was a hit on local radio in the Wilmington/Philadelphia area. As an adult, the Johnny Neel Band had a strong following up and down the east coast and released two well-received independent albums. Neel moved to Nashville in 1984. Performing with various bands in area clubs drew the attention of former Nashville resident Dickey Betts, who asked Neel to join his road band, and he soon began working on Bett's solo LP for Epic Records. That relationship led to seven cuts on the Pattern Disruptive album released in 1988, including the AOR hit, "Rock Bottom".

Neel's talented keyboard and harmonica playing on the Pattern Disruptive album convinced Gregg Allman to ask Neel to tour with his road band which led to the inclusion of the cut "Island" on The Gregg Allman Band album (also released in 1988), co-written with Allman, Dan Toler, and Tony Colton. In 1989 Neel was invited to join the reunited Allman Brothers Band. He immersed himself in touring, writing, and recording, which led to four cuts on the Allman's Seven Turns album (released in 1990), and the hit single "Good Clean Fun", co-written by Neel with Allman and Betts. In 2002 country stars Montgomery Gentry included "Good Clean Fun" as part of their My Town album.

In 1994, the studio album Johnny Neel & The Last Word was released. This album included the song "Maydell", which was co-written with Warren Haynes (Allman Brothers/Gov't Mule) and has been covered by the Allman Brothers on their Hittin' The Note album, and by John Mayall on his Wake Up Call album. The album also included the song "Read Me My Rights" which was co-written with Delbert McClinton, and which was covered by McClinton on his Nothing Personal album, by Ann Peebles on her Full Time Love, by Dorothy Moore on Stay Close to Home, and by Dalton Reed on Louisiana Soul Man. This album featured appearances by Jack Pearson (Allman Brothers) on guitar and Delbert McClinton on harmonica.

In 1995, Neel's album Comin' Atcha... Live was released and included live versions of "Read Me My Rights" and "Maydell". The album captured a live appearance by Neel and his band The Last Word including Jack Pearson and most of the musicians on The Last Word album.

In 2000, Neel released Late Night Breakfast which was recorded at his Straight Up Sound Studio with the members of his band The Last Word, along with special guests guitarists Shane Theriot (The Neville Brothers), and Rick Vito, as well as Wayne Jackson on trumpet. Late Night Breakfast was released on Neel's Breakin' Records label.

During the period of time the Late Night Breakfast recordings were made, Neel also became a member of Blue Floyd, an all-star jam band performing variations on the material of Pink Floyd. In addition to Neel, the band was composed of guitarist Marc Ford, drummer Matt Abts, bassist Berry Oakley Jr. (OKB Band) and until his death, Allen Woody on second guitar. Neel and Abts then went into the Straight Up Sound Studio and recorded the X² funk/jam duo project. X² − Johnny Neel / Matt Abts was released in 2002.

In 2004, Neel released the album Gun Metal Blue on his Breaking Records label which was also recorded at Straight Up Sound. These sessions included guitarists Chris Anderson, George Marinelli, and Pat Bergeson, drummer Vince Santoro, and vocalists Joanna Cotten, and Neel's wife, Christine Thompson Neel.

Also in 2004, the album Johnny Neel and The Italian Experience was released on the Italian label, Artesuono. This album included strings and horns as Neel moved in a jazz direction. The album included members of the Italian blues/rock/jam power trio W.I.N.D., with whom Neel has toured and recorded in Europe several times.

In addition to Blue Floyd and X² projects, Neel was a part of two other all-star collaborations. The group Deep Fried included Neel on keyboards, drummer Matt Abts, guitarist Brian Stoltz, and bassist George Porter Jr. Their album The Deep Fried Sessions − Live was released in 2004. The other group, The Grease Factor released two live recordings; Off the Cuff in 2004, and Live From Zambifest 2004 in 2005. The Grease Factor included guitarist Shane Theriot, bassist Derek Jones, drummer Jeff Sipe, and percussionist Count M'Butu.

Neel has provided vocals on five songs included on four Walt Disney Records CD releases, related to the Pixar Animation Studios movie releases, Finding Nemo, Cars, and Ratatouille. These include "Saturday Night Fish Fry" from the 2003 release Finding Nemo: Ocean Favorites, "My Old Car" from the 2006 release Lightning McQueen's Fast Tracks, "One Meat Ball" and "Banana Split for My Baby" from the 2007 release Ratatouille: What's Cooking?, and "Hot Rodder's Lament" from the 2009 release Mater's Car Tunes.

Towards the end of the new century's first decade Neel was recording and performing with his band The Criminal Element. Three albums have been released by Johnny Neel and The Criminal Element; Volume 1 (2007), Volume 2 (2008), and The CSI Chronicles (2010).

In 2010, Neel also released Harmonius, a solo project featuring only his vocals and keyboards.

In 2012, Every Kinda' Blues... But What You're Used To was released. A return to a more blues-based sound, the album includes ex-Allman Brothers guitarist Jack Pearson, and ex-Little Feat vocalist Shaun Murphy.

In 2019, Neel joined Chris Anderson, formerly of the Outlaws, in a new band entitled "Rattlebone" and released a record, "World's Gone Crazy." The band debuted their music in Nashville, TN on February 9, 2019, and played the first Synchronicity Southern Rock Festival in Wimauma, FL on February 23, 2019.

In November 2023, Neel performed at 3rd & Lindsley in Nashville with Criminal Element. They were the opening set for Gary Nicholson and the Change.

Neel died of heart failure in Nashville, Tennessee on October 6, 2024, at the age of 70.

== Discography ==
As a solo artist:

- One Hot Night – 1981
- You Should've Been There (live) – 1983
- Comin' Atcha Live (Big Mo/Silverwolf) – 1995
- Late Night Breakfast (Silverwolf) – 2000
- X² – Johnny Neel Matt Abts (Silverwolf) – 2002
- Gun Metal Blue (Breakin’ Records) – 2004
- Johnny Neel and the Italian Experience (Artesuono, Italy) – 2004
- Johnny Neel and The Criminal Element Vol 1 (Silverwolf) – 2007
- Johnny Neel and The Criminal Element Vol 2 (Silverwolf) – 2008
- Johnny Neel And The Criminal Element: CSI Chronicles (Silverwolf) CD/DVD – 2010
- Harmonious – (Homemade) CD/DVD – 2010
- Every Kinda' Blues... But What You're Used To (Breakin' Records) – 2012

Allman Brothers Band:

- Seven Turns (Epic) – 1990

Dickey Betts Band:

- Pattern Disruptive (Epic) – 1988

Gov't Mule:

- Life Before Insanity (Capricorn) – 2000
- The Deep End, Volume 2 (ATO) – 2002
