= Déjà Voodoo (Gov't Mule album) =

Studio album by Gov't Mule
- Released: September 14, 2004
- Genre: Blues rock
- Length: 75:47
- Label: ATO
- Producer: Michael Barbiero, Warren Haynes

Gov't Mule chronology
The Deepest End, Live in Concert (2003)	Déjà Voodoo (2004)	High & Mighty (2006)

Professional ratings
Review scores
Source	Rating
AllMusic	4/5 stars
Rolling Stone	2/5 stars

Déjà Voodoo is the sixth studio album by southern rock jam band Gov't Mule. The album was released on September 14, 2004, by ATO Records. It was the first Gov't Mule album to feature Andy Hess as a member, and the first studio album to feature Danny Louis as a member. It was also the first album that Gov't Mule did not play live before its release. The title is a reference to the band's belief that it rocks just like it used to before the death of former bassist Allen Woody.

Beginning in late 2005, the album was released to include the Mo' Voodoo EP.

== Track listing ==
All songs by Warren Haynes, except where noted.

No.	Title	Length
1.	"Bad Man Walking" (Haynes, Danny Louis)	4:08
2.	"About to Rage"	8:06
3.	"Perfect Shelter"	4:51
4.	"Little Toy Brain"	5:12
5.	"Slackjaw Jezebel"	5:25
6.	"Wine and Blood"	5:44
7.	"Lola Leave Your Light On" (Haynes, Andy Hess, Jeff Anders)	6:20
8.	"Silent Scream" (Haynes, Louis)	10:57
9.	"No Celebration"	6:32
10.	"Mr. Man"	4:18
11.	"My Separate Reality"	6:58
12.	"New World Blues"	6:58

== Personnel ==
- Warren Haynes – vocals, guitar
- Matt Abts – drums
- Danny Louis – keyboards
- Andy Hess – bass

=== Production ===
- Michael Barbiero – producer, recording engineer, mixer
- Steve Bucino – engineer
- Ted Young – engineer
