= Tales of Ordinary Madness (album) =

Studio album by Warren Haynes
- Released: 1993
- Recorded: 1993
- Genre: Blues-rock
- Length: 60:06
- Label: Megaforce Records
- Producer: Chuck Leavell

Warren Haynes chronology
Tales of Ordinary Madness (1993)	Live at Bonnaroo (2004)

Professional ratings
Review scores
Source	Rating
AllMusic	4/5 stars
Rolling Stone	4/5 stars

Tales of Ordinary Madness is the debut solo studio album by Warren Haynes. The album was released by Megaforce Records in 1993.

== Track listing ==
Music & lyrics by Warren Haynes, except "Tattoos and Cigarettes" by Jeff Anders, Keith Flynn & Warren Haynes

No.	Title	Length
1.	"Fire in the Kitchen"	5:30
2.	"Kiss Tomorrow Good-Bye"	3:39
3.	"Movers and Shakers"	7:06
4.	"I'll Be the One"	6:14
5.	"Blue Radio"	8:21
6.	"Invisible"	5:25
7.	"Sister Justice"	5:50
8.	"Angel City"	5:48
9.	"Tattoos and Cigarettes"	5:23
10.	"Power and the Glory"	5:48
11.	"Broken Promised Land"	6:59

== Personnel ==
- Warren Haynes - electric guitar, lead vocals, producer
- Chuck Leavell - piano, Hammond B-3 organ, keyboards, producer
- Johnny Neel- electric piano, Hammond B-3 organ
- Bernie Worrell- clavinet ("Invisible")
- Randall Bramblett- saxophone ("Power and the Glory")
- Michael Rhodes- bass & fretless bass guitar (except 1, 2, 7 & 8)
- Lincoln Schleifer- bass guitar (1, 2, 7 & 8)
- Greg Morrow- drums (except 1, 2, 6, 7 & 8)
- Steve Holley- drums (1, 2, 6, 7 & 8)
- Marc Quiñones- conga drums, cowbell, percussions
- Alfreda Gerald, Juanita Flemster, Calvin Thompson- backing vocals
