= By a Thread (Gov't Mule album) =

Studio album by Gov't Mule
- Released: October 27, 2009
- Recorded: Willie Nelson's Pedernales Studio, January 2009
- Length: 60:07
- Label: Evil Teen Records
- Producer: Gordie Johnson; Warren Haynes

Gov't Mule chronology
Mighty High (2007)	By a Thread (2009)	Mulennium (2010)

Professional ratings
Review scores
Source	Rating
AllMusic	4/5 stars

By a Thread is the ninth studio album by American Southern rock jam band Gov't Mule. The album was released on October 27, 2009, by Evil Teen Records. It is the first album to feature bassist Jorgen Carlsson, who joined the band in 2008, replacing Andy Hess.

On August 17, 2009, the first track of the album, "Broke Down on the Brazos", was made available for listening on Gov't Mule's official website, as well as on the band's Myspace and Facebook pages. The track features the playing of Billy Gibbons, best known as the singer and guitarist for the American blues rock band ZZ Top.

== Track listing ==
All songs by Warren Haynes, except as noted

No.	Title	Length
1.	"Broke Down on the Brazos" (Matt Abts, Jorgen Carlsson, Haynes, Danny Louis)	6:19
2.	"Steppin' Lightly" (Abts, Carlsson, Haynes, Louis)	7:10
3.	"Railroad Boy" (traditional; arranged by Abts, Carlsson, Haynes, Louis)	5:03
4.	"Monday Mourning Meltdown"	8:08
5.	"Gordon James"	3:48
6.	"Any Open Window" (Abts, Carlsson, Haynes, Louis)	4:45
7.	"Frozen Fear"	5:48
8.	"Forevermore"	4:17
9.	"Inside Outside Woman Blues #3"	9:04
10.	"Scenes from a Troubled Mind"	7:23
11.	"World Wake Up" (Haynes, Louis)	5:54

== Personnel ==
=== Gov't Mule ===
- Warren Haynes – vocals, guitar
- Matt Abts – drums, percussion
- Danny Louis – keyboards, rhythm guitar
- Jorgen Carlsson – bass

=== Additional personnel ===
- Billy Gibbons – guitar on "Broke Down on the Brazos"
- Andy Hess – bass on "Scenes from a Troubled Mind" and "World Wake Up"
- Gordie Johnson – background vocals on "Scenes from a Troubled Mind"
