= Man in Motion (Warren Haynes album) =

Studio album by Warren Haynes
- Released: May 10, 2011
- Recorded: 2008
- Genre: Rock
- Length: 60:06
- Label: Concord Music Group

Warren Haynes chronology
Live at Bonnaroo (2004)	Man in Motion (2011)	Ashes & Dust (2015)

Man in Motion is the second studio album by American musician Warren Haynes. The album was released on May 10, 2011, by Concord Music Group. The album has sold 80,000 copies in the US as of June 2015.

== Critical reception ==
Professional ratings
Review scores
Source	Rating
AllMusic	4/5 stars
PopMatters	7/10
Rolling Stone	3.5/5 stars

Man in Motion received generally positive reviews from music critics. David Fricke of Rolling Stone said, "Before he became an Allman Brother and started Gov't Mule, this power-blues singer-guitarist was a Nashville cat, playing and writing country-soul music. Man in Motion is a swing back to that hardy romanticism, with more Memphis in the mix and a plaintive poise in Haynes' vocals and solos." Matt Edsall of PopMatters stated, "As the title states, Man In Motion showcases a veteran songwriter and legendary guitarist moving in new directions and expanding his already notable career. Don’t worry, though, Deadheads and Mule fanatics. You’ll still get your fill of badass guitar work."

== Track listing ==
No.	Title	Length
1.	"Man In Motion"	7:52
2.	"River's Gonna Rise"	6:51
3.	"Everyday Will Be Like a Holiday"	5:29
4.	"Sick of My Shadow"	6:56
5.	"Your Wildest Dreams"	7:18
6.	"On a Real Lonely Night"	7:38
7.	"Hattiesburg Hustle"	6:33
8.	"A Friend to You"	5:44
9.	"Take a Bullet"	5:24
10.	"Save Me"	6:16
11.	"Sick of My Shadow (Demo)"	5:03

== Personnel ==
- Warren Haynes- electric (lead & rhythm) guitar, lead vocals
- Ron Holloway- tenor saxophone
- Ruthie Foster- vocals
- Ivan Neville- electric organ, clavinet, backing vocals
- Gordie Johnson- acoustic & electric (rhythm) guitar, producer
- Ian McLagan- piano, Hammond B-3 organ
- George Porter, Jr- bass guitar
- Ray Weber- drums

Grooveline Horns ("Man in Motion" & "Take a Bullet")

== Charts ==
Chart (2011)	Peak position
US Billboard 200	19
US Top Blues Albums (Billboard)	14
US Top Rock Albums (Billboard)	7
US Digital Albums (Billboard)	14
US Top Tastemaker Albums (Billboard)	6
