= Live at Bonnaroo =

Live album by Warren Haynes
- Released: June 8, 2004
- Recorded: Bonnaroo Music Festival June 15, 2003
- Genre: Blues-rock
- Length: 78:53
- Label: ATO Records

Warren Haynes chronology
Tales of Ordinary Madness (1993)	Live at Bonnaroo (2004)	Man in Motion (2011)

Professional ratings
Review scores
Source	Rating
Allmusic	3/5 stars

Live at Bonnaroo is the third album and second live album by Warren Haynes and was recorded at the Bonnaroo Music Festival on June 15, 2003. It is Warren Haynes' third release as a solo artist.

== Track listing ==
- "Lucky" (C. Greenwood, J. Greenwood, Selway, Yorke) - 4:22
- "Patchwork Quilt" (Haynes) - 4:23
- "To Lay Me Down" (Garcia, Hunter) - 4:52
- "Glory Road" (Sisk) - 4:59
- "The Real Thing" (Haynes) - 5:54
- "One" (Bono) - 5:23
- "In My Life" (Haynes) - 4:19
- "I'll Be The One" (Haynes) - 5:03
- "Fallen Down" (Haynes) - 5:25
- "Forevermore" (Haynes) - 3:39
- "Beautifully Broken" (Haynes, Louis) - 3:34
- "I've Got Dreams To Remember" (O. Redding, Z. Redding, Rock) - 4:25
- "Tastes Like Wine" (Haynes) - 4:39
- "Wasted Time" (Henley, Frey) - 4:53
- "Stella Blue" (Garcia, Hunter) - 6:19
- "Soulshine" (Haynes) - 6:42, with Vusi Mahlasela
