= Gov't Mule (album) =

Studio album by Gov't Mule
- Released: June 27, 1995
- Studio: Bearsville (Woodstock, New York); River Sound (New York)
- Genre: Blues rock
- Length: 69:48
- Label: Relativity
- Producer: Michael Barbiero

Gov't Mule chronology
Gov't Mule (1995)	Live at Roseland Ballroom (1996)

Gov't Mule is the debut studio album by the American band Gov't Mule. The album was produced and mostly recorded live by Michael Barbiero at Bearsville Sound Studios, with many tracks running into each other. "Mule" is still a concert favorite, and "Rockin' Horse" was later recorded by the Allman Brothers Band when Warren Haynes rejoined the group for the album Hittin' the Note.

== Critical reception ==
Professional ratings
Review scores
Source	Rating
AllMusic	3.5/5 stars
Classic Rock	7/10 stars

Rolling Stone wrote that "the Mule kick with punishing metal force... Woody and drummer Matt Abts hammer out a bottom-heavy platform from which Haynes can grandstand."

== Track listing ==
No.	Title	Writer(s)	Length
1.	"Grinnin' in Your Face"	Eddie "Son" House	1:35
2.	"Mother Earth"	Peter Chatman, Louis Simpkins	8:13
3.	"Rockin' Horse"	Gregg Allman, Warren Haynes, Allen Woody, Jack Pearson	4:06
4.	"Monkey Hill"	Warren Haynes, Allen Woody	4:40
5.	"Temporary Saint"	Warren Haynes	5:44
6.	"Trane"	Warren Haynes, Allen Woody, Matt Abts	7:28
7.	"Mule"	Warren Haynes, Allen Woody, Matt Abts	5:39
8.	"Dolphineus"	Warren Haynes, Allen Woody, Matt Abts	2:03
9.	"Painted Silver Light"	Warren Haynes	7:07
10.	"Mr. Big" (Free cover)	Paul Rodgers, Andy Fraser, Simon Kirke, Paul Kossoff	6:06
11.	"Left Coast Groovies (For FZ)"	Warren Haynes, Allen Woody, Matt Abts	6:52
12.	"World of Difference"	Warren Haynes	10:15

== Personnel ==
- Warren Haynes - vocals, guitar
- Matt Abts - drums
- Allen Woody - bass
- John Popper - harmonica
- Hook Herrera - harmonica
- Michael Barbiero - production
