= Warren Haynes =

American guitarist, singer and songwriter (born 1960)

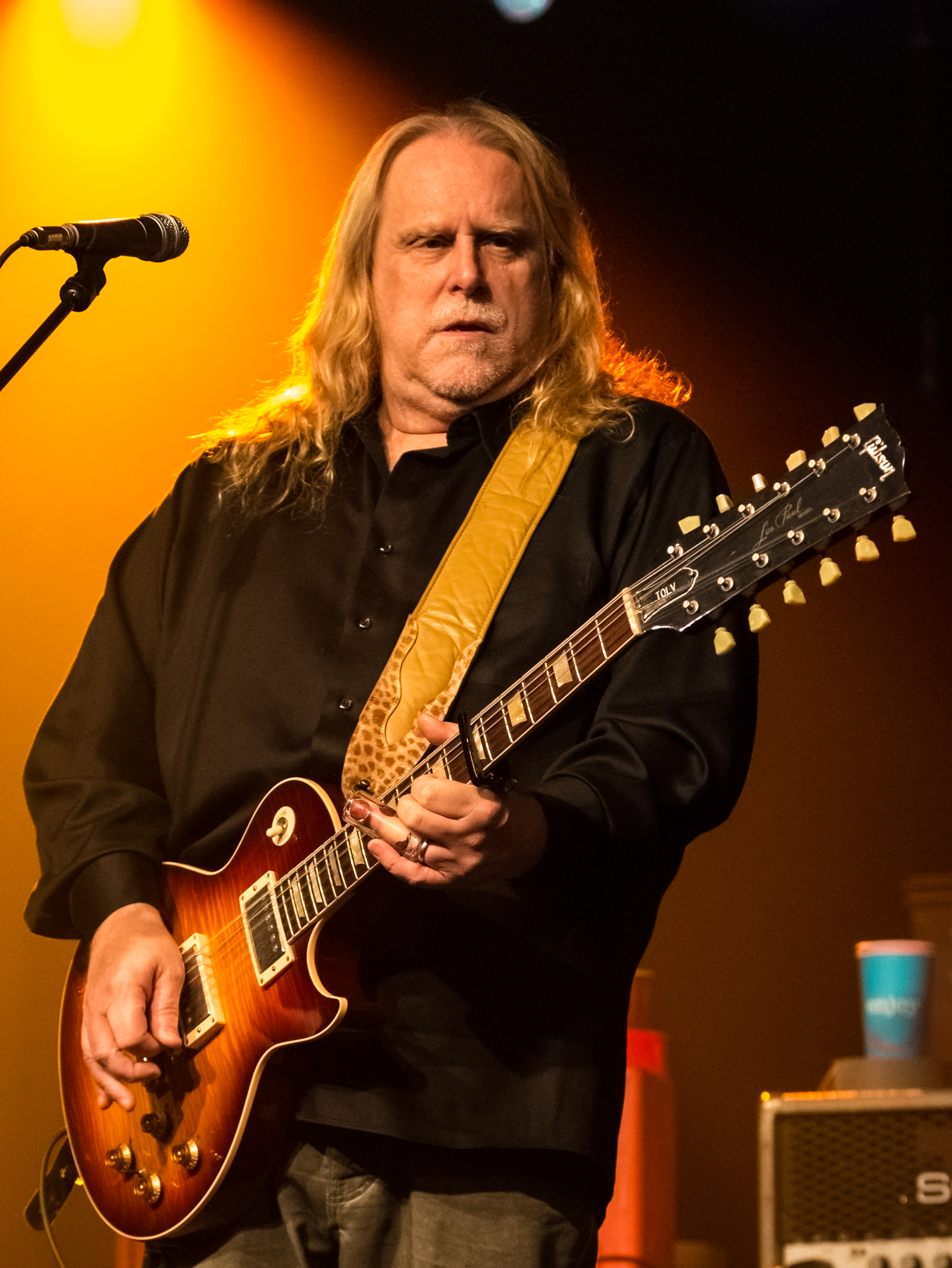
- Haynes performing with Gov't Mule in 2017

Background information
- Born: April 6, 1960 (age 66); Asheville, North Carolina, U.S.
- Genres: Southern rock; blues rock; soul; hard rock; blues; jam rock
- Occupations: Musician, songwriter, record producer
- Instruments: Guitar, vocals
- Years active: 1982–present
- Labels: Epic, Evil Teen, Provogue, Sanctuary, Sony
- Member of: Gov't Mule
- Formerly of: Dickey Betts Band; The Allman Brothers Band; Phil Lesh and Friends; The Dead
- Website: warrenhaynes.net

Warren Haynes (born April 6, 1960) is an American musician, singer and songwriter. He is best known for his work as longtime guitarist with the Allman Brothers Band and as founding member of the jam band Gov't Mule. Early in his career he was a guitarist for David Allan Coe and the Dickey Betts Band. Haynes is also known for his associations with the surviving members of the Grateful Dead, including touring with Phil Lesh and Friends and the Dead. In addition, Haynes founded and manages Evil Teen Records.

== Personal background and style ==
Haynes spent his formative years in Asheville, North Carolina, where he was born, and lived with his two older brothers and his father, Edward Haynes. He began playing guitar at age 11. His primary guitar is a Gibson Les Paul '58 Reissue electric guitar.

Haynes has referred to himself as a "Gibson man", often playing Gibson Firebird and Gibson ES-335 models as well as the Les Paul models. This was acknowledged by the American guitar maker Gibson which has included a limited edition Warren Haynes signature Les Paul in its product line; built according to Haynes' specifications and modeled on his '58 Les Paul.

Haynes is married to Stefani Scamardo, a DJ for Sirius Radio and the long-time manager of Gov't Mule. In 2011, they had their son, Hudson.

== Influences ==
In a 2006 interview with Gibson.com's Backstage Pass, Haynes explains his early influences: "When I first started – chronologically speaking – Hendrix and Clapton and Johnny Winter were the first three people I got turned on to. That was the Cream era of Clapton. Then eventually, I heard the Allman Brothers and everybody else from that era that I stole something from (laughs). Of course, I would read interviews with all these people and find out who they listened to. And they all listened to B.B. King and Freddie King and Albert King and Howlin' Wolf and Muddy Waters and Elmore James, so I would go back and discover that stuff."

== Professional career ==
=== Early years ===
Warren Haynes joined David Allan Coe's touring and recording band in 1980 when he was 20 years old. He remained with Coe's band for four years.

Shortly after, Haynes got a gig with The Nighthawks, while continuing to play with local musicians and doing session guitar and vocal work. One notable achievement of this period is a song he co-wrote with Dennis Robbins and Bobby Boyd that would later be cut by country musician Garth Brooks, titled "Two of a Kind, Workin' on a Full House", which was released on the album No Fences and remained the number 1 single on Billboard's Hot Country Singles & Tracks chart for twenty weeks.

=== Dickey Betts Band and The Allman Brothers Band ===
Around 1987, Haynes got a call to perform backup vocals on a studio album by Dickey Betts, along with Dennis Robbins. Betts, who had concentrated on his solo career following the breakup of the Allman Brothers Band, decided to add Haynes to his band as his guitarist after the session. With Matt Abts on drums and Johnny Neel on keyboards, the now-formed Dickey Betts Band released the 1988 album Pattern Disruptive. In the same year, Haynes also co-wrote the title track for Gregg Allman's solo album Just Before the Bullets Fly.

In 1989, the Allman Brothers Band decided to reunite, and Betts recruited Haynes to join the band. Also joining were Neel on keyboards and Allen Woody on bass guitar. Haynes has since played on four well-received studio albums, including the gold certified Where It All Begins (1994). It was that same year when Haynes played to his largest audience ever with the Allman Brothers at Woodstock '94. Haynes and Woody left the group in March 1997 to focus solely on their side project Gov't Mule. Shortly after Woody's untimely death on August 26, 2000, Haynes began appearing with the Allman Brothers Band again alongside young guitar prodigy Derek Trucks. He returned to the band as a full-time member shortly thereafter.

On January 8, 2014, Haynes and Trucks jointly announced their respective plans to leave the ABB by the end of 2014, following the conclusion of the band's celebration of its 45th anniversary, with the band subsequently announcing that they would disband at the same time.

=== Gov't Mule ===
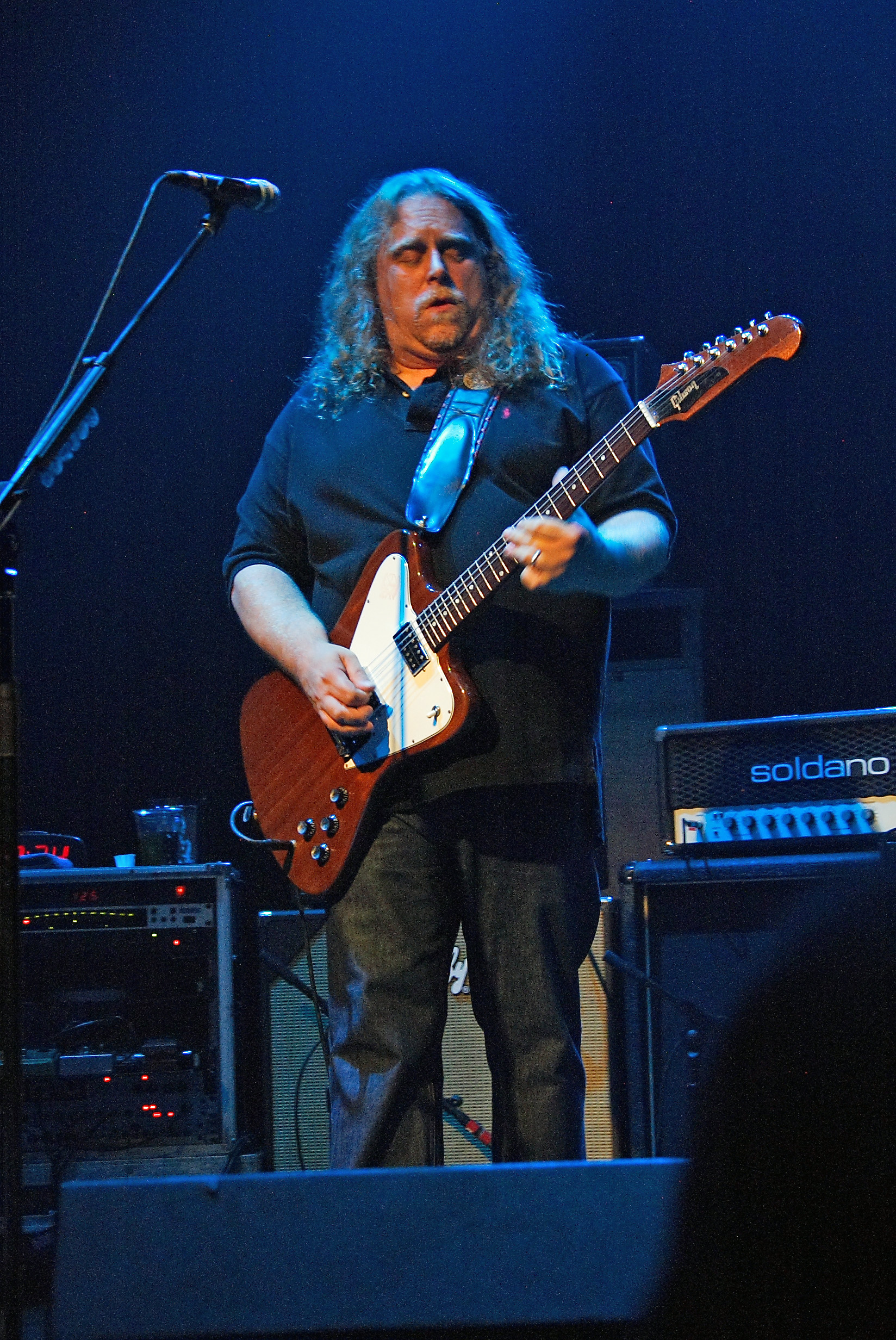
Haynes playing with Gov't Mule in 2008

In 1994, Haynes formed Gov't Mule with Abts and Woody. Haynes and Woody initially split time between Gov't Mule and the Allman Brothers Band, but after The Allman Brothers' last show of their 1997 run at New York's Beacon Theatre on March 26, 1997, both left the band to focus on Gov't Mule full-time. They released three albums and became known for their powerful live performances. Some of these performances have been released as official live albums (Live at Roseland Ballroom, Live... With a Little Help from Our Friends and Mulennium; the latter two capture consecutive New Year's Eve shows).

On August 26, 2000, Allen Woody died unexpectedly while the group were on tour. Following his death, a decision was made to finish the tour acoustically as the "Smile at Half-Mast" tour. Gov't Mule released two studio albums (The Deep End, Volume 1 and The Deep End, Volume 2) and a live album/DVD (The Deepest End, Live in Concert) featuring many of Woody's favorite bass players. In 2003, Andy Hess (bass) and Danny Louis (keyboards/backing vocals) were added as permanent members to the group. Late the following year, this lineup released their first studio effort, Deja Voodoo, which later included an EP of newly recorded material titled Mo Voodoo. After recording 2006's High & Mighty, Gov't Mule also released a dub EP titled Mighty High and a DVD titled Tale of 2 Cities that contained two full performances recorded in 2004 and 2006. The two shows on the DVD captured the first show of the Deja Voodoo Tour and the last show of the High & Mighty Tour, serving to encapsulate what was created over those two years. In 2008, Hess left Gov't Mule to pursue other projects and was replaced by relative unknown Jorgen Carlsson. By a Thread, the first studio album from Gov't Mule featuring Carlsson, was released in 2009 on Haynes' own label, Evil Teen Records.

In 2010, they went back to the vault and released Mulennium, a three-disc recording of a show from New Year's Eve 1999 in Atlanta. This was the first official recording released of the original trio since the death of Woody in 2000. It also featured an appearance by Little Milton, one of Haynes's guitar heroes from his youth.

=== The Dead ===
Since the death of Jerry Garcia in 1995, Haynes has performed and toured with many of the surviving members of the Grateful Dead. In 1997, Haynes and Abts came onstage to jam with Bob Weir and Rob Wasserman in a small club. The performance was being filmed for Robert Mugge's film on Robert Johnson, Hellhound on My Trail. Then in 1999, Phil Lesh approached Haynes to play lead guitar and sing for his solo group Phil Lesh and Friends. He played regularly with Lesh for three years and has continued making occasional appearances in the ever evolving lineup of his "friends" in subsequent years. In 2004, when the Dead (remaining members of the Grateful Dead) were in need of a new guitarist, they called upon Haynes to come play lead and sing for that summer's "Wave That Flag Tour". His run with The Dead ended on a night where he came in with them, then performed a solo acoustic set, and then ended the night playing with the Allman Brothers Band and starting out on their next tour. He played lead guitar for the Dead again in late 2008 when they performed at a benefit at Penn State for then-presidential candidate Barack Obama, later touring with them in the spring of 2009.

=== Solo artist and guest appearances ===
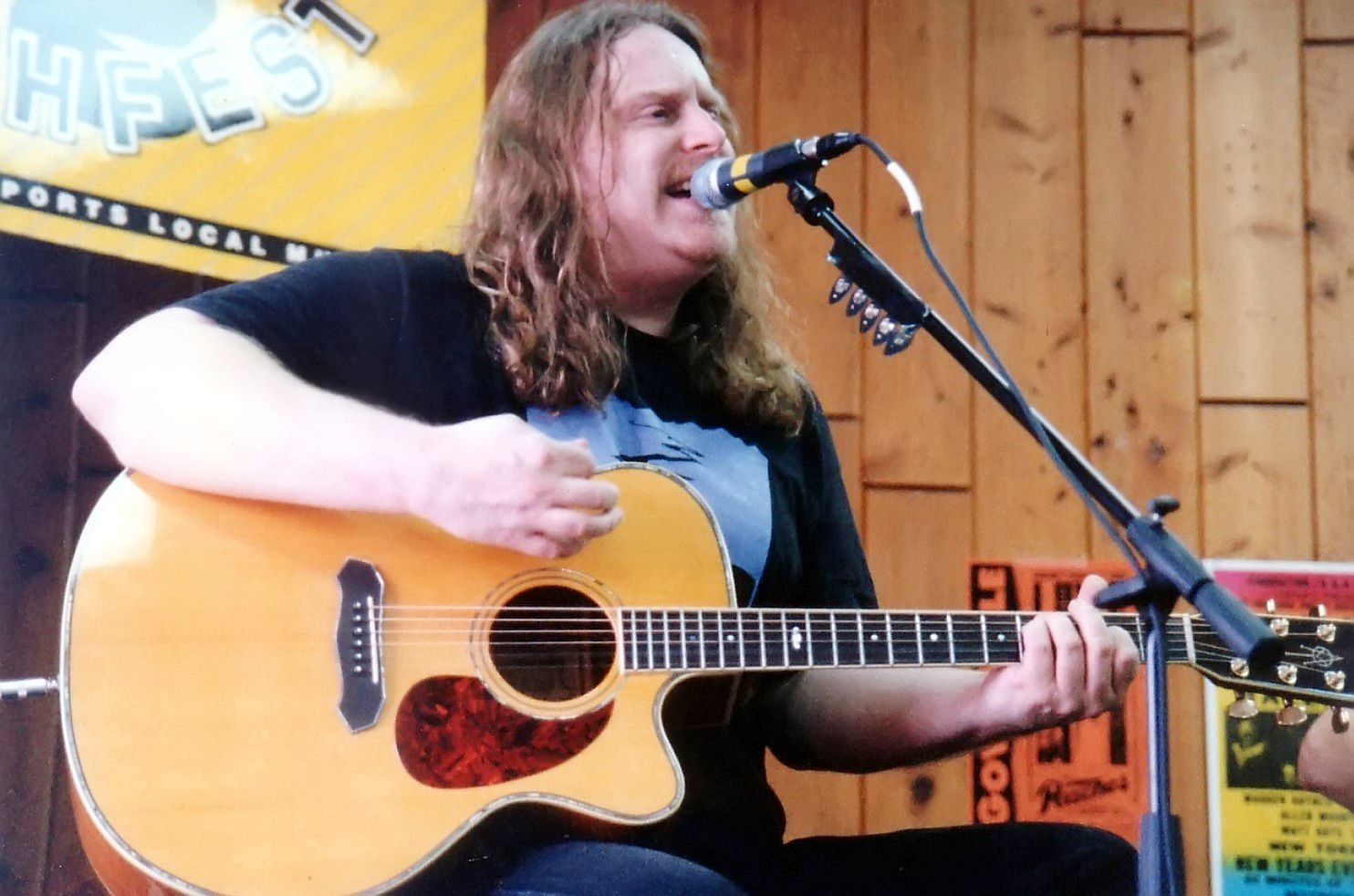
Haynes playing an acoustic set with Gov't Mule, early in the band's career, at a record store in Fort Lauderdale, Florida

In 1993, Haynes released his first solo album, Tales of Ordinary Madness, which was produced by former Allman Brothers keyboardist Chuck Leavell. He toured briefly in support of the record with various musicians, including Danny Louis.

In 2003 and 2004, Haynes released two solo acoustic albums, The Lone EP, a collection of live performances and Live From Bonnaroo which documents his solo performance (part acoustic, part electric) at the 2003 Bonnaroo Music Festival. When not touring with one of his electric bands, Haynes will often take time out to do solo acoustic shows, which include a variety of well-known and rare covers along with his own material. In 2004, Warren Haynes performed five full-length solo acoustic shows, as well as opened 23 times for The Dead and once for The Allman Brothers Band.

He has also made 45 song appearances and 28 concert appearances with Dave Matthews Band, including on two released live albums: Live at Central Park Concert in 2003, in which he performed "Cortez the Killer", and "Jimi Thing", and Live at Piedmont Park where he performed "What Would You Say".

In 2005, Haynes performed a one time only show under the name Warren Haynes & Friends. The band included Abts on drums, Dave Schools of Widespread Panic on bass, John Medeski of Medeski Martin & Wood and Skerik, the avant-garde sax player of bands such as Critters Buggin' and Les Claypool's Fearless Flying Frog Brigade. The group played a selection of blues songs, including songs of Led Zeppelin, Jimi Hendrix, Tom Waits, and Gov't Mule standards. The band was also featured as the house band during a number of tapings of Last Call with Carson Daly in early February 2005. During one of these tapings, the scheduled musical act was absent, so Haynes performed an acoustic rendition of U2's "One". The song also appeared on his Live from Bonnaroo album. In 2008, Haynes covered the Bob Dylan song "I Shall Be Released" with Coheed and Cambria, as well as their song "Welcome Home", as part of an encore the band played during their shows in support of Neverender.

After recording Gov't Mule's By a Thread album, Haynes formed The Warren Haynes Band. The group included George Porter Jr. on bass, Ivan Neville on keys and Raymond Weber on drums. Also joining them on keys was Ian McLagan, as well as vocalist Ruthie Foster and Ron Holloway on tenor sax. The Warren Haynes Band made their debut performance at Haynes' annual Christmas Jam in Asheville, North Carolina on December 11, 2010. The album Man in Motion was released in May 2011 and debuted in the Billboard Top 20. An extensive tour occurred after the release through the rest of 2011; the touring version of the band included Holloway, drummer Terence Higgins of the Dirty Dozen Brass Band, bassist Ron Johnson, keyboardist Nigel Hall, and various vocalists, either Foster, Alfreda Gerald, or Alecia Chakour.

The Warren Haynes Band's Live at The Moody Theater 2CD/1DVD package came out in April 2012 on Stax Records. The lineup on the recording consisted of Haynes (lead vocals and guitar), Ron Holloway (saxophone), Ron Johnson (bass), Terence Higgins (drums), Nigel Hall (keyboards) and Alecia Chakour (backing vocals).

Haynes has stated that his further solo efforts might take him into still other fields. "There are other projects I want to do, too," he relates. "I'm interested in recording a singer-songwriter oriented album with more acoustic instruments, a jazzy instrumental CD and a straight-up blues record. But like Man in Motion, those albums will have to wait until the time is right." During the COVID-19 pandemic, Haynes remained active writing material dealing with subject matter he has not touched on in the past.

== The Christmas Jam ==
Starting in 1988, Haynes put together an annual charity benefit show, inviting musicians originally from his home town of Asheville who were home for Christmas, the only time of year they would all be in town at the same time. The first show, held at the 45 Cherry club in Asheville on December 29, 1988, was dubbed "The Christmas Jam: Musician's X-Mas Reunion." Some of the artists at the first Christmas Jam were Warren Haynes, Mike Barnes, Matt Sluder, The Crystal Zoo, The Stripp Band, Ronnie Burgin and the McBad Brothers Band.

In the initial years the proceeds from the concert were donated to various charities but eventually the organizers decided to focus on Asheville Area Habitat for Humanity, a non-profit that constructs and preserves homes; advocates for fair and just housing policies; and provides training and access to resources to help families improve their shelter conditions. In tribute to his financial support of Asheville Area Habitat for Humanity, a Habitat neighborhood in Buncombe County, North Carolina, has a street named after Haynes, and another subdivision was named in honor of Warren and Stefanie Haynes's son. In 2002, Haynes was presented with the key to the city by Asheville mayor Charles Worley. In 2003, Worley proclaimed December 18 as "Warren Haynes Day" in Asheville.

The event has continued to grow every year and is now dubbed "Warren Haynes Presents: The Christmas Jam." Due to increasing audience demand, the show was eventually moved to the Asheville Civic Center. In 2008, for its twentieth anniversary, "The Christmas Jam" consisted of two nights of music; including "The Christmas Jam By Day," a series of events including daytime concerts, movie screenings, and art, photo, and poster exhibits taking place in downtown Asheville on the days leading up to the show. The event reverted to one night in 2009, but retained "The Christmas Jam By Day," and included the new "Christmas Comedy Jam." The same format was repeated in 2010.

== Instructional videos ==
Haynes has recorded two instructional videos for Arlen Roth's Hot Licks Video: Electric Blues & Slide Guitar and Acoustic Slide and the art of Electric Improvisation. He discusses his influences and shows an array of techniques such as "call and response", string bending, vibrato, slide guitar in standard tuning and some acoustic open tuning licks in G and E tunings. For the demonstrations of the electric improvisation section of the second video, he is accompanied by Allen Woody and Matt Abts.

== Taping policy ==
All of Warren Haynes' projects allow fans to record and trade audio recording of his live performances. He does not approve of video recording or photography of his performances and does not provide access to soundboard patches. The Allman Brothers Band also allowed taping and trading, but does not allow distribution of their shows via the internet using such applications as BitTorrent. The reason given for this restriction is that it is more communal to trade person-to-person. In a 2005 USA Today article, Haynes stated that while tape-trading may cut into band profits, the benefits outweigh the drawbacks due to an increased fanbase.

== Discography ==
This discography lists those releases involving Warren Haynes, including his various bands, other projects and guest appearances.

=== Solo recordings and Warren Haynes Band ===
- Tales of Ordinary Madness, 1993
- The Lone EP, 2003 (live)
- Live at Bonnaroo, 2004 (live)
- Man in Motion, 2011
- Live From The Asheville Civic Center, 2011
- Live at the Moody Theater, 2012 (live CD/DVD)
- Ashes & Dust, 2015 (with Railroad Earth)
- Million Voices Whisper, 2024

=== With The Allman Brothers Band ===
- Seven Turns, 1990
- Shades of Two Worlds, 1991
- An Evening with the Allman Brothers Band: First Set, 1992 (live)
- Where It All Begins, 1994
- An Evening with the Allman Brothers Band: 2nd Set, 1995 (live)
- Hittin' the Note, 2003
- One Way Out, 2004 (live)
- Play All Night: Live at the Beacon Theatre 1992, 2014 (live)
- The Fox Box, 2017 (live)
- Cream of the Crop 2003, 2018 (live)
- Warner Theatre, Erie, PA 7-19-05, 2020 (live)
- Final Concert 10-28-14, 2024 (live)

=== With Gov't Mule ===
- Gov't Mule, 1995
- Live at Roseland Ballroom, 1996 (live)
- Dose, 1998
- Live... With a Little Help from Our Friends, 1999 (live)
- Life Before Insanity, 2000
- The Deep End, Volume 1, 2001
- The Deep End, Volume 2, 2002
- The Deepest End, Live in Concert, 2003 (live)
- Deja Voodoo, 2004
- Mo' Voodoo (EP), 2005
- High & Mighty, 2006
- Mighty High, 2007
- Holy Haunted House, 2007 (live)
- By a Thread, 2009
- Mulennium, 2010 (live)
- Shout!, 2013
- Dark Side of the Mule, 2014 (live)
- Sco-Mule, 2015 (live)
- Stoned Side of the Mule Vol. 1 & 2, 2015 (live) – Record Store Day release
- Dub Side of the Mule, 2015 (live)
- The Tel-Star Sessions, 2016
- Revolution Come...Revolution Go, 2017
- Heavy Load Blues, 2021
- Peace...Like a River, 2023

=== With the Dave Matthews Band ===
- The Central Park Concert, 2003 (live)
- Live at Piedmont Park, 2007 (live)
- Live Trax Vol. 20, 2011 (live)

=== With The Derek Trucks Band ===
- Out of the Madness, 1998 – vocal obligato and lead guitar on "Good Morning Little Schoolgirl", "Forty-Four" and "Death Letter"
- Already Free, 2009 – writing credits on "Back Where I Started"

=== Miscellaneous ===
- Dennis Robbins – The First of Me, 1986 – guitar and background vocals, writing credits on five tracks
- The Black Sorrows – Hold On to Me, 1988 – additional guitars on "The Chosen Ones"
- Earl Thomas Conley – The Heart of It All, 1988 – writing credits on "Finally Friday"
- Dickey Betts Band – Pattern Disruptive, 1988
- Gregg Allman Band – Just Before the Bullets Fly, 1988 – writing credits on "Before the Bullets Fly"
- Garth Brooks – No Fences, 1990 – writing credits on "Two of a Kind, Workin' on a Full House"
- Dennis Robbins – Man with a Plan, 1992 – writing credits on "Man with a Plan"
- John Mayall – Wake Up Call, 1993 – writing credits on "Maydell"
- Larry McCray – Delta Hurricane, 1993 – writer of "Soul Shine"
- Blues Traveler – Four, 1994 – slide guitar on "The Mountains Win Again"
- Coco Montoya – Ya Think I'd Know Better, 1996 – writer of "Hiding Place"
- David Allan Coe – Live – If That Ain't Country..., 1997 (live)
- Little Milton – Welcome to Little Milton, 1999 – Gov't Mule guests on two tracks
- Kenny Wayne Shepherd – Live On, 1999 – vocals and slide guitar
- Joe Bonamassa – A New Day Yesterday, 2000 – writer of "If Heartaches Were Nickles"
- Corrosion of Conformity – America's Volume Dealer, 2000 – slide guitar on "Stare Too Long"
- Everlast – Eat at Whitey's, 2000 – guests on "Mercy on My Soul"
- Kevn Kinney (of Drivin N Cryin) – The Flower & The Knife, 2000 – producer; guitar and backing vocals on most tracks
- The Les Claypool Frog Brigade – Purple Onion, 2002 – guitar on "Buzzards of Green Hill"
- Phil Lesh and Friends – There and Back Again, 2002
- The Bottle Rockets – Blue Sky, 2003 – guitar on "Lucky Break", "I Don't Wanna Go Back", "Cartoon Wisdom", "Mom & Dad" and "I.D. Blues"
- Jack Casady – Dream Factor, 2003 – lead guitar on "Outside" and "Sweden"
- John Scofield – That's What I Say: John Scofield Plays the Music of Ray Charles, 2005 – slide guitar on "Night Time Is the Right Time"
- Peter Frampton – Fingerprints, 2006 – guitar on "Blooze"
- Beth Hart – 37 Days, 2007 – writer of "Soul Shine"
- Mountain – Masters of War, 2007 – guitar on "Serve Somebody" and "The Times They Are a-Changin'"
- Elvin Bishop – The Blues Rolls On, 2008 – guests on "The Blues Rolls On" and "Struttin' My Stuff"
- Buckwheat Zydeco – Lay Your Burden Down, 2009 – writing credits and slide guitar on "Lay Your Burden Down"
- Peter Frampton – Frampton Comes Alive! 35th Anniversary Deluxe Edition, 2011 – solo performance of "Do You Feel Like We Do" included as a bonus track
- Rich Robinson – Through a Crooked Sun, 2011 – acoustic and slide guitar on "Bye Bye Baby"
- William Shatner – Seeking Major Tom, 2011 – guitar on "Twilight Zone"
- Trombone Shorty – For True, 2011 – guests on "Encore"
- Robben Ford – Into the Sun, 2015 – guests on "High Heels and Throwing Things"
- The Marcus King Band – The Marcus King Band, 2016 – producer; slide guitar on "Virginia"
- The Pretty Reckless – Who You Selling For, 2016 – lead guitar on "Back to the River"
- Supersonic Blues Machine – West of Flushing, South of Frisco, 2016 – guests on "Remedy"
- Michael McDonald – Wide Open, 2017 – guitar on "Just Strong Enough"
- Walter Trout – We're All in This Together, 2017 – guitar and vocals on "The Sky Is Crying"
- Black Stone Cherry – Family Tree, 2018 – vocals on "Dancin' in the Rain"
- Ann Wilson – Immortal, 2018 – guests on "You Don't Own Me" and "Luna"
- Blackberry Smoke – You Hear Georgia, 2021 – writing credits and guitar on "All Rise Again"
- Larry McCray – Blues Without You, 2022 – guitar on "Down to the Bottom"
- Edgar Winter – Brother Johnny, 2022 – guests on "Memory Pain"
- Dolly Parton – Rockstar, 2023 – guests on "I Want You Back"

==== Compilations ====
- Hempilation: Freedom Is NORML, 1995 – with Gov't Mule on "Don't Step on the Grass, Sam"; with Drivin' N Cryin' on "Too Rolling Stoned"
- Hempilation, Vol. 2: Free the Weed, 1998 – with Gov't Mule on "30 Days in the Hole"
- Hound Dog Taylor: A Tribute (tribute album to Hound Dog Taylor), 1998 – with Gov't Mule on "Gonna Send You Back to Georgia"
- Wintertime Blues: The Benefit Concert, 2000 (live)
- Under the Influence: A Jam Band Tribute to Lynyrd Skynyrd (tribute album to Lynyrd Skynyrd), 2004 – with Gov't Mule on "Simple Man"
- Endless Highway: The Music of the Band (tribute album to The Band), 2007 – with Gov't Mule on "The Shape I'm In" and the Allman Brothers Band on "The Night They Drove Old Dixie Down"
- Freeway Jam: To Beck and Back (tribute album to Jeff Beck), 2007 – "The Pump"
- Occupy This Album, 2012 – "River's Gonna Rise" (live)
- Tommy Bolin and Friends: Great Gypsy Soul (tribute album to Tommy Bolin), 2012 – also production credits
