= High & Mighty =

Album by Gov't Mule

Studio album by Gov't Mule
- Released: August 22, 2006
- Length: 71:55
- Label: ATO
- Producer: Gordie Johnson, Warren Haynes

Gov't Mule chronology
Déjà Voodoo (2004)	High & Mighty (2006)	Mighty High (2007)

Professional ratings
Review scores
Source	Rating
AllMusic	4/5 stars
Music Box	3.5/5 stars
PopMatters	(5/10)

High & Mighty is the seventh studio album by southern rock jam band Gov't Mule. The album was released on August 22, 2006, by ATO Records.

== Track listing ==
All songs written by Warren Haynes.

No.	Title	Length
1.	"Mr. High & Mighty"	5:33
2.	"Brand New Angel"	6:53
3.	"So Weak, So Strong"	5:08
4.	"Streamline Woman"	4:06
5.	"Child of the Earth"	5:45
6.	"Like Flies"	4:37
7.	"Unring the Bell"	8:05
8.	"Nothing Again"	6:55
9.	"Million Miles from Yesterday"	3:43
10.	"Brighter Days"	6:33
11.	"Endless Parade"	8:58
12.	"3 String George"	5:39

== Personnel ==
- Warren Haynes – guitar, vocals, production
- Matt Abts – drums, percussion
- Danny Louis – keyboards, guitar, background vocals
- Andy Hess – bass

=== Additional personnel ===
- Gordie Johnson – production, mixing, engineering, background vocals, tambourine
- Ruthie Foster, Sonia Moore, Sheree Smith – background vocals
