= Allen Woody =

American bass guitarist (1955–2000)

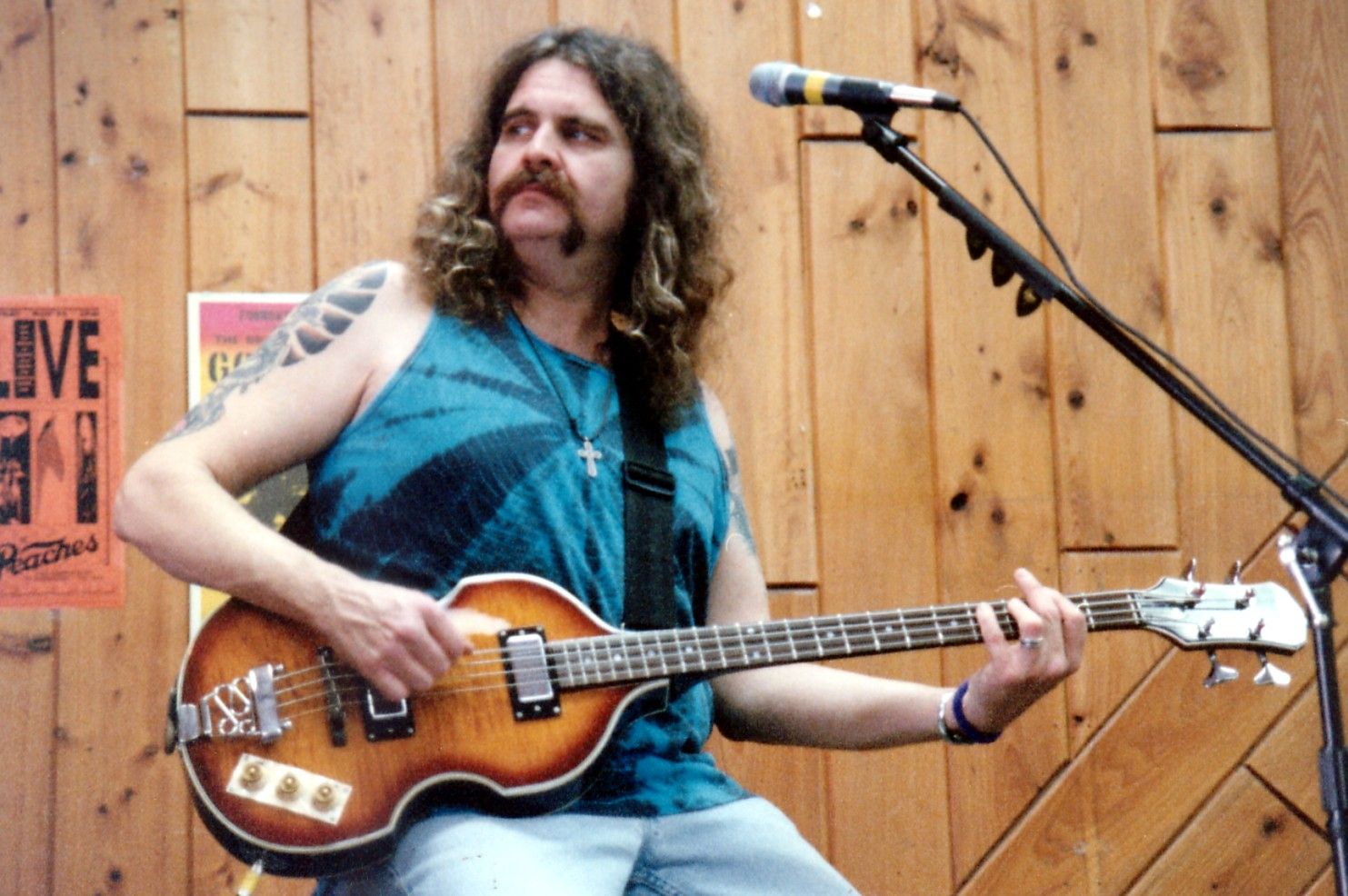
- Woody playing an Epiphone Viola Bass with Gov't Mule

Background information
- Born: Douglas Allen Woody; October 3, 1955
- Died: August 25, 2000 (aged 44) Queens, New York, U.S.
- Genres: Southern rock, hard rock, blues rock
- Occupations: Musician, songwriter
- Instrument: Bass
- Years active: 1975–2000
- Formerly of: The Allman Brothers Band, Gov't Mule, The Peter Criss Band, The Artimus Pyle Band, Blue Floyd, Montage

Douglas Allen Woody (October 3, 1955 – August 25, 2000) was an American bass guitarist best known for his eight-year tenure in the Allman Brothers Band and as a co-founder of Gov't Mule.

== Biography ==
After having studied at Vanderbilt University's Blair School of Music, Woody joined the Allman Brothers Band along with guitarist Warren Haynes upon the group's reunion in 1989. Woody and Haynes formed side project Gov't Mule in 1994 with former Dickey Betts drummer Matt Abts. Haynes and Woody decided to leave the Allman Brothers Band in 1997 to put a full-time effort into Gov't Mule. Prior to that, Woody played in the 1970s jazz fusion rock band Montage, and following that with former Kiss drummer Peter Criss in the Criss Penridge Alliance in the 1980s.

== Death and legacy ==
Woody was found dead the morning of Saturday, August 26, 2000 at the Marriott Courtyard in Queens, New York. A preliminary autopsy performed was inconclusive and showed no immediate cause of death; but he was subsequently determined to have died of a heroin overdose.

The Canadian band Big Sugar wrote the song "Nashville Grass" about Woody's death and funeral.

== Discography ==
With the Allman Brothers Band

- Seven Turns (1990)
- Shades of Two Worlds (1991)
- Live at Great Woods (1992 VHS/LaserDisc release, 2000 DVD release)
- An Evening with the Allman Brothers Band: First Set (1992)
- Where It All Begins (1994)
- An Evening with the Allman Brothers Band: 2nd Set (1995)
- Play All Night: Live at the Beacon Theatre 1992 (2014)

With Gov't Mule

- Gov't Mule (1995)
- Live at Roseland Ballroom (1996)
- Dose (1998)
- Live... With a Little Help from Our Friends (1998)
- Life Before Insanity (2000)
- The Deep End, Volume 1 (2001)
- Mulennium (2010)
- Sco-Mule (feat. John Scofield) (2015) - recorded live in Atlanta in 1999
- The Tel-Star Sessions (2016) - remixed/remastered demo recordings made in June 1994
