= Michael Barbiero =

American record producer (born 1949)

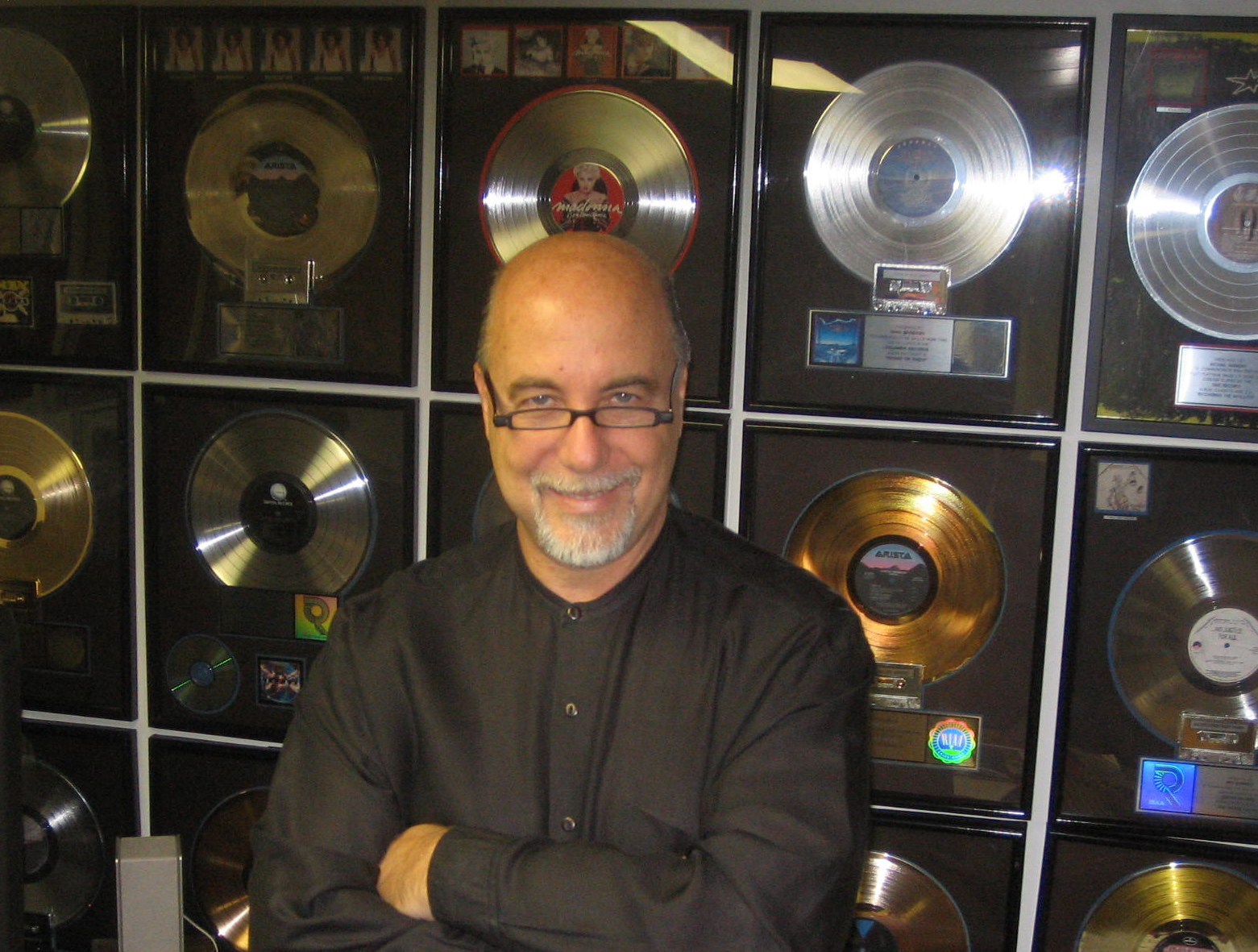
- Barbiero in 2007

Background information
- Also known as: Mike Barbiero, M. Barbiero
- Born: Michael Francis Barbiero; June 25, 1949 (age 77); New York City, U.S.
- Genres: Heavy metal; hard rock; blues rock; pop; dance-pop; hip-hop; R&B; funk; disco; reggae
- Occupations: Record producer; mixer; engineer; songwriter
- Years active: 1971–present
- Label: Publisher: Ring Bearer Music
- Website: LinkedIn

Michael Francis Barbiero (born June 25, 1949) is an American record producer, mixer, engineer, and songwriter.

He has worked with a number of artists, such as Metallica, Guns N' Roses, Tesla, Cinderella, Blues Traveler, Ziggy Marley, Belouis Some, Cutting Crew, Counting Crows, Scorpions, John Lennon, L7, The Velvet Underground, Alice Cooper, Lostprophets, Cypress Hill, Three Doors Down, Thrice, Joe Cocker and Anthrax.

Barbiero started as a staff producer for Paramount Records, earning a Grammy nomination at the age of 23 for his production of the Serpico movie soundtrack album. He later went on to sign Stephanie Mills to her first recording contract. He then specialized as a remixer in the disco era, and employed his engineering talents on 12" remixes and singles for artists such as Whitney Houston, Jackie Moore, Dan Hartman, Gonzales, The Spinners, Aretha Franklin, The Jacksons, Melba Moore, Joe Simon, Madonna, Earth, Wind and Fire, Mick Jagger and Simply Red.

In 1986, he worked as a studio musician on Alphaville's album Afternoons in Utopia. In 1987, he worked as mixer on the Guns N' Roses' debut album Appetite for Destruction.

Barbiero was a long-time collaborator with producer Steve Thompson. They started working on dance songs and later moved to rock. One of their first rock projects for Geffen Records (which now owns the Paramount Records catalog) was a band called City Kidd, who later became Tesla.

Since 1995 Michael has produced, mixed and/or engineered projects for Counting Crows, Richy Nix and Lostprophets, among others, plus producing or co-producing with Warren Haynes, eleven projects with Gov't Mule, including the award-winning albums The Deepest End and Déjà Voodoo. He has also co-produced with Warren Haynes The Allman Brothers' Hittin' the Note studio album and, in 2003, their RIAA platinum certified DVD, Live at the Beacon Theatre and live album, One Way Out. Barbiero has engineered, produced, and/or mixed projects that have been nominated for Grammy awards fourteen times, winning four times for: Blues Traveler ("Run-around" – 1994 – Best Rock Performance by a Duo or Group with Vocal), Ziggy Marley (Fallen Is Babylon – 1997- Best Reggae Album), Peter Frampton Fingerprints – 2006 – Best Pop Instrumental Album, and Cutting Crew (Broadcast 1986 – Best New Artist). More recently, he has mixed songs for Thomas Helmig, Maroon 5, Antigone Rising and Hinder. In 2005 and 2006, Michael contributed articles to Mix Magazine. He is the president of Ring Bearer Music Ltd. publishing, owner of Ring Bearer Music Studios and a longtime member of ASCAP.
