= Matt Abts =

American drummer (born 1953)

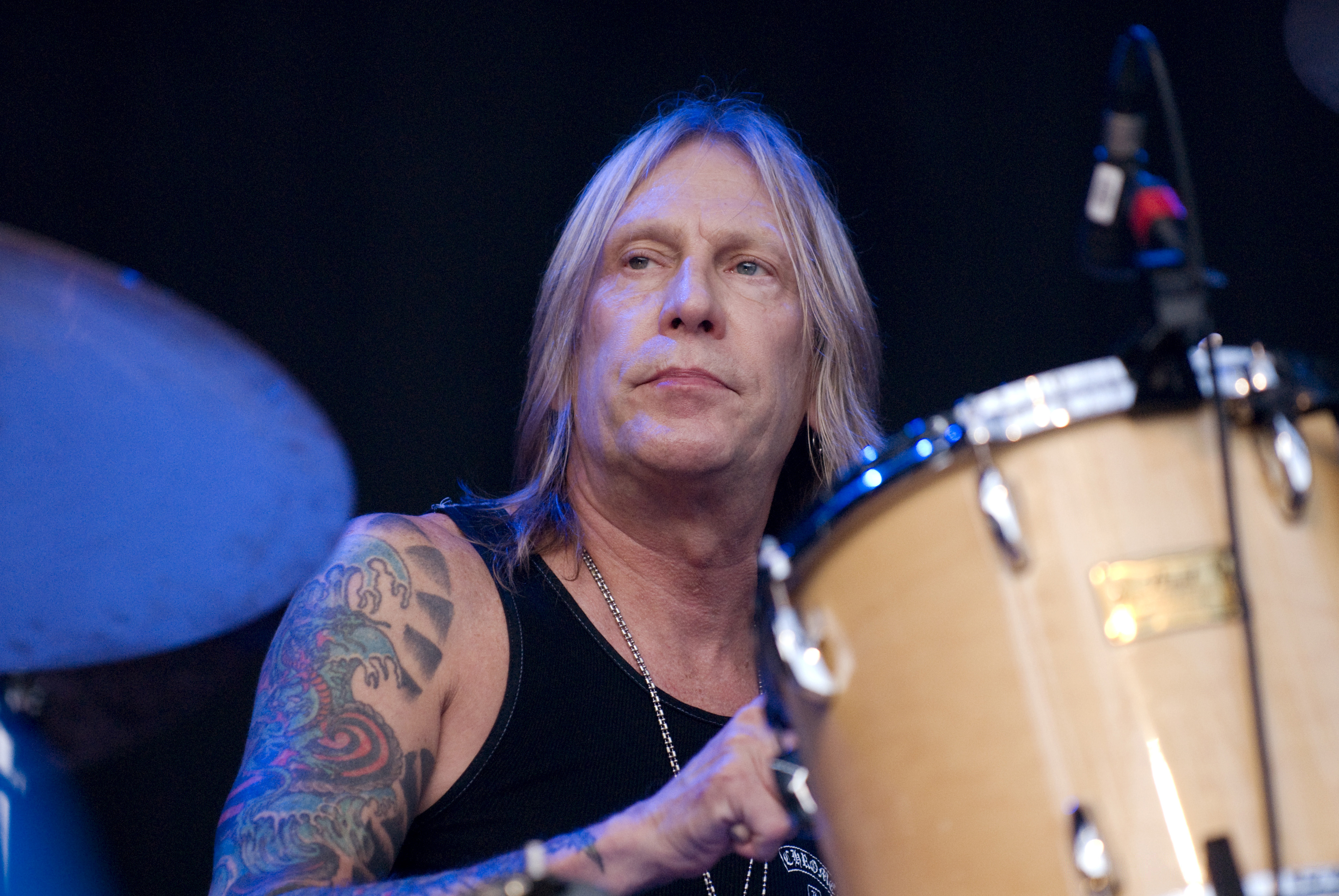
- Abts performing with Gov't Mule in 2007

Background information
- Born: September 30, 1953 (age 72); Fort Sill, Oklahoma, United States
- Genres: Rock, blues rock
- Occupation: Musician
- Instruments: Drums, percussion
- Years active: 1968–present
- Member of: Gov't Mule
- Website: mattabts.com

Matt Abts (born September 30, 1953) is an American drummer, best known as one of the founding members of the rock band Gov't Mule.

== Biography ==
Abts attended high school in Panama where he started playing music. After moving to Virginia, he played in local bands for eight years, most notably, the band Orphan, and then moved to Florida. There he played in and recorded an album with Chuck & John and the News, a local bar band from Bradenton, Florida, during the early 1980s. In 1984, he played drums for Dickey Betts and Chuck Leavell. Abts recorded Pattern Disruptive with the Dickey Betts Band in 1988 which also included guitarist/vocalist Warren Haynes. Abts joined Haynes and Allen Woody, who had both been members of The Allman Brothers Band, to form Gov't Mule in 1994.

Abts has also played in the Pink Floyd tribute band Blue Floyd which was known for its blues versions of Pink Floyd songs, and with bassist Jorgen Carlsson in Planet of the Abts, a 2011 offshoot of Gov't Mule.
