= A Pillow of Winds =

Song by Pink Floyd

Song by Pink Floyd

from the album Meddle
- Released: 5 November 1971
- Recorded: 21 March – July 1971
- Studio: EMI, AIR, and Morgan, London
- Genre: Psychedelia
- Length: 5:13
- Label: Harvest
- Songwriters: David Gilmour; Roger Waters

Official audio
- "A Pillow of Winds" on YouTube

"A Pillow of Winds" is a song by the English rock band Pink Floyd, the second track from their sixth studio album, Meddle (1971). The song, initially known as "Dave's Guitar Thing", was recorded and produced at EMI, AIR, and Morgan Studios between March and July 1971. Written by David Gilmour and Roger Waters, it is a slow, psychedelic, acoustic, and pastoral love ballad. Its title comes from the Chinese tile game mahjong, which Waters, Nick Mason, and their wives played.

Never performed live by Pink Floyd, the popular perception of "A Pillow of Winds" is that of a filler track in the band's catalogue. In various reviews, critics praised its soft and acoustic sound, but were more mixed about Waters' lyrics.

== Recording and production ==
Recording of "A Pillow of Winds", known at that time as "Dave's Guitar Thing", was started by Pink Floyd on 21 March 1971, as part of the sessions for their album Meddle, at EMI Studios (now known as Abbey Road Studios). It was one of the last pieces of material recorded for the record. Peter Brown was chosen as the main audio engineer for recording and was assisted by John Leckie. The first take recorded was used as the rhythm track, to which additional guitar and vibraphone was added on March 25. Writers Jean-Michel Guesdon and Philippe Margotin also suggest that guitarist David Gilmour might have recorded his electric slide guitar parts on this date. On 30 March, the Abbey Road Studios 8-track tape was copied to the 16-track tape and moved to AIR Studios, where some of the sessions took place. There, Brown and Leckie continued to fulfil their roles, finishing the transition between "One of These Days" (the album's previous song) and "A Pillow of Winds" with the fade out of a synthesised wind effect synthesised. The track was finished at Morgan Studios in July 1971, with Rob Black as the lead audio engineer and Roger Quested as his assistant.

== Music and lyrics ==
"A Pillow of Winds"
The final verse of "A Pillow of Winds", which is a slow, psychedelic, acoustic, and pastoral love ballad.

Spanning a length of five minutes and thirteen seconds, "A Pillow of Winds" is a slow, acoustic psychedelic song attributed to Roger Waters and David Gilmour. In its musical and lyrical themes, critics have described the song as a pastoral love ballad. According to Guesdon and Margotin, the themes suit Gilmour's style of folk and country music. Along with "Fearless" from the same album, it was the first song co-written by Gilmour and Waters since the 1968 song "Point Me at the Sky". After the syntheised wind of "One of These Days" fades out, "A Pillow of Winds" opens with arpeggios played on two acoustics and one electric guitar, accompanied by Richard Wright's Hammond organ and vibraphone along with Nick Mason's hi-hat. To author Mick Cormack, the song features no real tune achieved through arpeggios and the acoustic guitar's nylon strings, which together give off a "droning, slumbering feeling". Gilmour's lead vocal is performed in a sleepy-sounding tone—Mark Blake assumes that the tone might suggest that the song's protagonist is going through a cannabis-induced sleep.

The title stems from a scoring combination from the Chinese tile game mahjong, which was regularly played by Waters, Mason, and their wives Judith Trim and Lindy Rutter during their holidays in the south of France. Guesdon and Margotin feel that Waters' lyrics give a feeling of peace, calmness, and harmony. Furthermore, they argue that the lyrics can be seen "as a hymn of praise [...] to the all-powerful sun". Pitchfork's Andy Cush noticed a similarity, whether intentional or not, between the first lines of the song: "A cloud of eiderdown draws around me, softening the sound; sleepytime, and I lie with my love by my side, and she's breathing low"; and the lyrics of "Flaming" from the group's debut album The Piper at the Gates of Dawn (1967), in which former member Syd Barrett sings: "Alone in the clouds all blue, lying on an eiderdown".

== Release and reception ==
"A Pillow of Winds" was released by Harvest Records on 5 November 1971 as the second track of the group's sixth studio album, Meddle. The song was never performed live by the band, a fact that both writer Chris Charlesworth and Pink Floyd journalist Andy Mabbett suggest has led to its popular perception as a filler track in the band's catalogue.

In a contemporary review, Jean-Charles Costa of Rolling Stone describes "A Pillow of Winds", along with another track from Meddle, "San Tropez", as "ozone ballads" [...]; "pleasant little acoustic numbers hovering over a bizarre back-drop of weird sounds". In a 1972 review for Circus, Ed Kelleher calls it "softly hypnotic", and praises Wright's organ and Gilmour's guitars as cornerstones, arguing that the song drifts around them. Waters' lyrics received mixed reception among critics: Beats per Minute reviewer Daniel Griffiths praises Waters for not using love clichés and instead letting it "sound inherently Pink Floyd, regardless of the subject matter". On the other hand, Robert Christgau laments the song's lyrics in his book Christgau's Record Guide: Rock Albums of the Seventies (1981), heavily criticising the use of the word "behold" in the third verse and suggests for the band to never use it again.

== Personnel ==
According to Guesdon and Margotin:

- David Gilmour – lead vocals, acoustic guitar, (Note: Guesdon and Margotin theorise that Waters could have helped Gilmour by playing one of the acoustic guitars.) electric guitar
- Richard Wright – Hammond organ, vibraphone
- Nick Mason – hi-hats
- Roger Waters – fretless bass

== Notes ==
=== Works cited ===
==== Books ====
- Blake, Mark (2008). Pigs Might Fly: The Inside Story of Pink Floyd. Minneapolis: Quarto Publishing Group UK. ISBN 978-1-84513-748-9 – via the Internet Archive.
- Guesdon, Jean-Michel; Margotin, Philippe (2017). Elliott, Richard George; Smith, Jackie (eds.). Pink Floyd: All the Songs: The Story Behind Every Track. New York: Black Dog & Leventhal Publishers. ISBN 978-0-316-43924-4 – via the Internet Archive.
- Cormack, Mike (2024). Everything under the Sun: The Complete Guide to Pink Floyd. London: History Press Limited, The. ISBN 978-1-80399-535-9.
- Mason, Nick (7 October 2004). Inside Out: A Personal History of Pink Floyd. Weidenfeld & Nicolson Illustrated. ISBN 0-7538-1906-6 – via the Internet Archive.
- Reisch, George A. (2011). Pink Floyd and Philosophy: Careful with that Axiom, Eugene!. New York: Open Court. ISBN 978-0-8126-9745-2.
- Hart, Chris; Morrison, Simon A. (2022). The Routledge handbook to Pink Floyd. London New York: Routledge. ISBN 978-1-000-64956-7.
- Jones, Cliff (1996). Another Brick in the Wall: The Stories Behind Every Pink Floyd Song (3rd ed.). Carlton Books Limited. ISBN 978-1-8586-8849-7.
- Mabbett, Andy; Charlesworth, Chris (1995). The Complete Guide to the Music of Pink Floyd. London: Omnibus. ISBN 978-0-7119-4301-8.
- Povey, Glenn (2007). Echoes : The Complete History of Pink Floyd (New ed.). Mind Head Publishing. ISBN 978-0-9554624-0-5.
- Christgau, Robert (1981). "Consumer Guide '70s: P". Christgau's Record Guide: Rock Albums of the Seventies. Ticknor & Fields. ISBN 0-89919-026-X. Archived from the original on 6 April 2019 – via robertchristgau.com.

==== Web articles ====
- Erlewine, Stephen Thomas (2001). "Pink Floyd – Meddle". AllMusic.
- "Mahjong's magic casts a growing spell". China Daily. 31 October 2012.
- Costa, Jean-Charles (6 January 1972). "Meddle". Rolling Stone.
- Cush, Andy (12 July 2020). "Pink Floyd: Meddle". Pitchfork.
- Griffiths, Daniel (19 April 2012). "Second Look: Pink Floyd – Meddle". Beats per Minute.
- Reed, Ryan (4 June 2012). "Why Pink Floyd's 'Obscured by Clouds' Deserves Another Look". Ultimate Classic Rock.
- Kelleher, Ed (January 1972). "Pink Floyd – Meddle". Circus – via superseventies.com.
