= San Tropez (song) =

Song by Pink Floyd

from the album Meddle
- Released: 5 November 1971 (UK)
- Recorded: 19–22 July 1971; 23–27 August 1971
- Studio: Morgan (London, UK); AIR (London, UK)
- Genre: Jazz rock
- Length: 3:44
- Label: Harvest
- Songwriter: Roger Waters
- Producer: Pink Floyd

"San Tropez" is the fourth track from the album Meddle by the band Pink Floyd. It was written by Roger Waters.

== Writing ==
Unlike the other tracks on Meddle, "San Tropez" was not written collaboratively; instead, Roger Waters wrote the piece himself and brought it into the studio already finished. It is the only track on Meddle not co-written by David Gilmour. The song is about Saint-Tropez, a commune of the Var département in southern France located on the French Riviera. The song reflects an idealised vision of what a day in Saint-Tropez might be like.

=== Misunderstood lyric ===
Throughout the 1970s and beyond, the second-to-last line of lyrics to the song, "Making a date for later by phone", has been persistently misunderstood in Italy, mainly because of Waters' slurred pronunciation ("...fer-lita-pah-fon"), as being "Making a date for Rita Pavone", with a reference to the well-known 1960s Italian pop singer. Pavone herself has stated several times, in TV interviews and elsewhere, that she actually believes the line to be about her.

== Recording ==
While Roger Waters plays the acoustic guitar as well as his usual bass, "San Tropez" does include a short slide guitar solo from guitarist David Gilmour and an extended piano solo by keyboardist Richard Wright at the end.

== Reception ==
In a review for the Meddle album, Jean-Charles Costa of Rolling Stone described "San Tropez", along with "A Pillow of Winds", as an "ozone ballad". He further described the two as "pleasant little acoustic numbers hovering over a bizarre back-drop of weird sounds." Classic Rock Review described "San Tropez" as "a jazz-inflected pop song with a shuffle tempo." They went on further saying "[San Tropez] adds another diverse dimension to the album with its easy-going crooner-like melody and atmosphere." This song was one of several to be considered for the band's 2001 greatest hits album, Echoes: The Best of Pink Floyd, but it was ultimately not included.

== Personnel ==
- Roger Waters – vocals, acoustic guitar, bass guitar
- David Gilmour – slide guitar
- Richard Wright – piano
- Nick Mason – drums and percussion
