= Meddle =

- Artwork for original British LP release

Studio album by Pink Floyd
- Released: 30 October 1971
- Recorded: 4 January – 11 September 1971
- Studios: AIR, EMI, and Morgan, London
- Genres: Progressive rock; psychedelia
- Length: 46:47
- Label: Harvest
- Producer: Pink Floyd

Pink Floyd chronology
Relics (1971)	Meddle (1971)	Obscured by Clouds (1972)

Singles from Meddle
- 1. "One of These Days / Fearless" Released: 29 November 1971

Meddle is the sixth studio album by the English rock band Pink Floyd, released by Harvest Records on 30 October in the United States and 5 November 1971 in the United Kingdom. The album was produced between the band's touring commitments, from January to August 1971 at a series of locations around London, including EMI Studios (now Abbey Road Studios) and Morgan Studios.

With no material to work with and no clear idea of the album's direction, the band devised a series of novel experiments which eventually inspired the album's signature track "Echoes". It is considered a transitional album between the Syd Barrett-influenced group of the 1960s and the Waters-led era of the 1970s.

As with several previous albums, the cover was designed by Hipgnosis, and has been explained by its creator Storm Thorgerson – who was unhappy with the final result – to be an ear underwater. The album was well received by critics upon its release, and was commercially successful in the United Kingdom, but lacklustre publicity on the part of the band's American label Capitol Records led to poor sales in the US upon initial release.

== Recording ==
Returning from a series of tours across America and England in support of Atom Heart Mother, at the start of 1971 Pink Floyd commenced work on new material at EMI Studios (now Abbey Road Studios) in London. At the time, EMI was equipped only with eight-track multitrack recording facilities, which the band found insufficient for the increasing technical demands of their project. They transferred their best efforts, including the opening of what became "Echoes", to 16-track tape at smaller studios in London (namely AIR and Morgan in West Hampstead) and resumed work with the advantage of more flexible recording equipment. Engineers John Leckie and Peter Bown recorded the main EMI and AIR sessions, while for minor work at Morgan, Rob Black and Roger Quested handled the engineering duties.

Lacking a central theme for the project, the band used several experimental methods in an attempt to spur the creative process. One exercise involved each member playing on a separate track, with no reference to what the other members were doing. The tempo was entirely random while the band played around an agreed chord structure, and moods such as "first two minutes romantic, next two up tempo". Each recorded section was named, but the process was largely unproductive; after several weeks, no complete songs had been created.

Leckie had worked on albums such as George Harrison's All Things Must Pass and Ringo Starr's Sentimental Journey both in 1970, and was employed as a tape-operator on Meddle, partly for his proclivity for working into the early hours of the morning. He has said that Pink Floyd's sessions would often begin in the afternoon, and end early the next morning, "during which time nothing would get done. There was no record company contact whatsoever, except when their label manager would show up now and again with a couple of bottles of wine and a couple of joints." The band would apparently spend long periods of time working on simple sounds, or a particular guitar riff. They also spent several days at AIR attempting to create music using a variety of household objects, a project which would be revisited between their next albums, The Dark Side of the Moon (1973) and Wish You Were Here (1975).

Following these early experiments – called Nothings – the band developed Son of Nothings, which was followed by Return of the Son of Nothings as the working title of the new album, which ultimately evolved into "Echoes".

Meddle was recorded between the band's various concert commitments, and therefore its production was spread over a considerable period of time. The band recorded in the first half of April 1971, but in the latter half played at Doncaster and Norwich before returning to record at the end of the month. In May they split their time between sessions at EMI, and rehearsals and concerts in London, Lancaster, Stirling, Edinburgh, Glasgow and Nottingham. June and July were spent mainly performing at venues across Europe. August was spent in the far east and Australia, September in Europe, and October to November in the US. In the same period, the group also produced Relics, a compilation album of some of Pink Floyd's earlier works. A mix of the album was prepared at Command Studios on 21 and 26 September. New 2016 stereo and 5.1 mixes of the album were inadvertently released as hidden tracks on the Reverber/ation Blu-ray disc in The Early Years 1965–1972 box set.

== Writing ==
"Echoes"
First verse of "Echoes"

Although the tracks possess a variety of moods, Meddle is generally considered more cohesive than its 1970 predecessor, Atom Heart Mother. The largely instrumental "One of These Days" is followed by "A Pillow of Winds", which is distinguished by being one of the few quiet, acoustic love songs in the Pink Floyd catalogue. These two songs segue into each other across windy sound effects, anticipating the technique that would later be used on Wish You Were Here. The title of "A Pillow of Winds" was inspired by the games of Mahjong that Roger Waters, Nick Mason, and their wives Judith Trim and Lindy Rutter played while in the south of France.

"One of These Days" was developed around an ostinato bassline created by David Gilmour, by feeding the output through a Binson Echorec. The bassline was performed by Gilmour and Roger Waters using two bass guitars, one on old strings. Drummer Nick Mason's abstruse "One of these days I'm going to cut you into little pieces" vocal line was recorded at double speed using a falsetto voice, and replayed at normal speed.

The song "Fearless" includes field recordings of Liverpool F.C. fans in the Anfield Kop singing club anthem "You'll Never Walk Alone", which brings the song to an end in a heavily reverberated fade-out. "San Tropez", by contrast, is a jazz-inflected pop song with a shuffle tempo, written by Waters in his increasingly deployed style of breezy, off-the-cuff songwriting. The song was inspired by the band's trip to the south of France in 1970. Pink Floyd uncharacteristically displayed their sense of humour with "Seamus", a pseudo-blues novelty track featuring Steve Marriott's dog Seamus (whom Gilmour was dog-sitting) howling along to the music. (Note: "Seamus" was remade as "Mademoiselle Nobs", featuring a different dog and no lyrics, in the film Pink Floyd: Live at Pompeii.) Although "Seamus" often tops polls of the worst songs Pink Floyd ever created, the band would use animal sounds again on the 1977 album Animals (albeit as part of the concept of the album).

The final song on the album is the 23-minute "Echoes". First performed as "Return of the Son of Nothing" on 22 April 1971 in Norwich, the band spent about three months on the track in three studios (Morgan, AIR and EMI). "Echoes" began with a studio experiment involving Richard Wright's piano. Wright had fed a single note through a Leslie speaker, producing a submarine-like ping. The band tried repeatedly to recreate this sound in the studio but were unsuccessful, and so the demo version was used on what would later become "Echoes", mixed almost exclusively at AIR Studios. Combined with David Gilmour's guitar, the band were able to develop the track further, experimenting with accidental sound effects, such as Gilmour's guitar being plugged into a wah-wah pedal back to front (connecting the guitar to the pedal's output and the pedal's input to the amplifier), an effect they used live from 1970 for the central section of “Embryo”. Unlike with Atom Heart Mother, the new multi-track capabilities of the studio enabled them to create the track in stages, rather than performing it in a single take. The final, 23-minute piece would eventually take up the entire second side of the album.

"Echoes" also gave its name to the 2001 compilation album Echoes: The Best of Pink Floyd, on which a much-edited version of the title track was included. On the compilation, multiple edits throughout the entire song cut the running length of the piece down by some seven minutes. Some of the material composed during the creation of Meddle was not used; however, one song would eventually become "Brain Damage", on The Dark Side of the Moon.

== Packaging ==
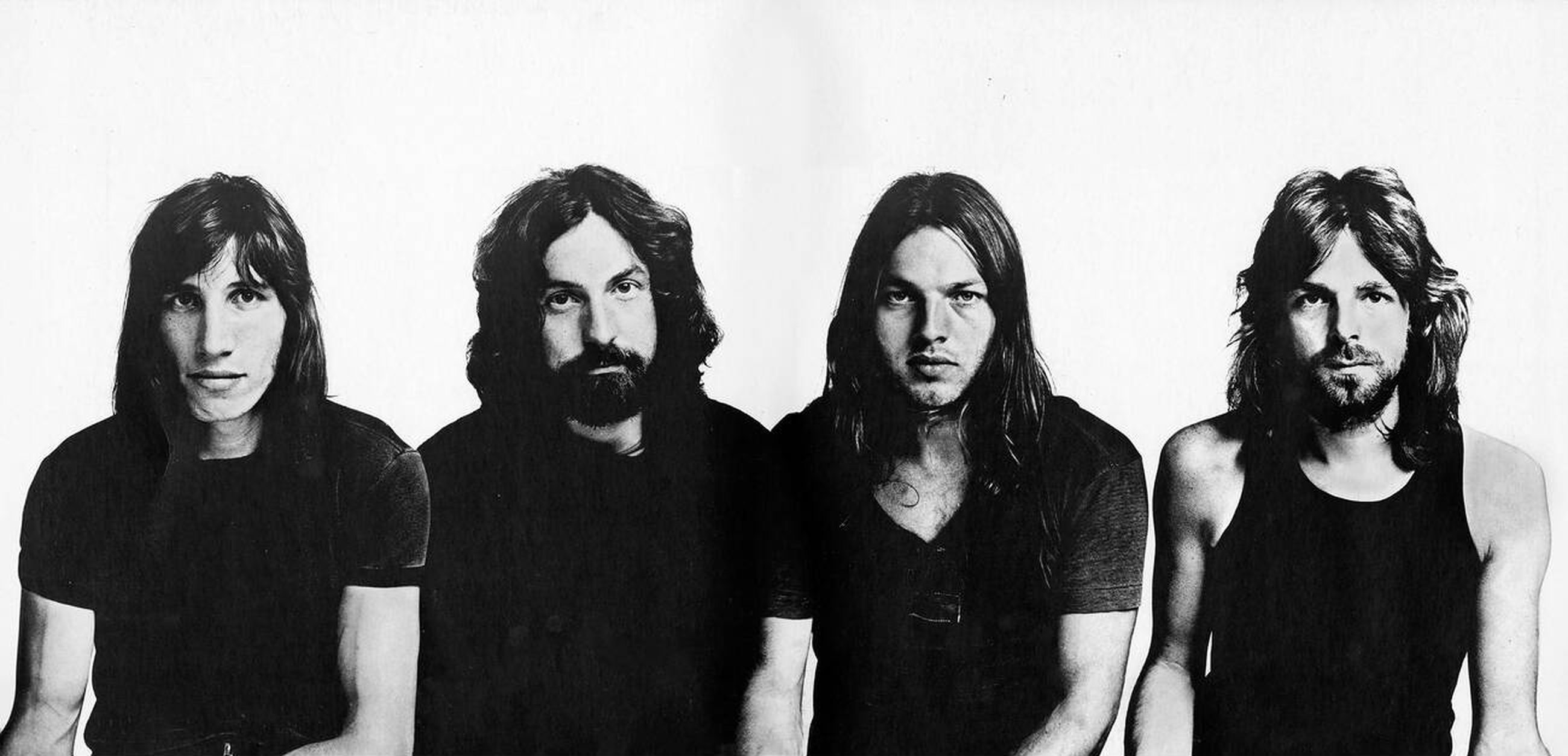
The inner sleeve, the last to show a group photo of this lineup of Pink Floyd. From left: Roger Waters, Nick Mason, David Gilmour, Richard Wright

The album's title Meddle is a play on words: a medal, and to interfere. Storm Thorgerson of the art-design group Hipgnosis originally suggested a close-up shot of a baboon's anus for the album cover photograph. He was overruled by the band, who informed him via an intercontinental telephone call while on tour in Japan that they would rather have "an ear underwater". The cover image was photographed by Bob Dowling. The image represents an ear, underwater, collecting waves of sound (represented by ripples in the water).

Thorgerson later expressed dissatisfaction with the cover, claiming it to be his least favourite Pink Floyd album sleeve: "I think Meddle is a much better album than its cover". Thorgerson's colleague Aubrey Powell shared his sentiments, saying: "Meddle was a mess. I hated that cover. I don't think we did them justice with that at all; it's half-hearted." The gatefold contains a group photograph of the band, which would be their last until 1987's A Momentary Lapse of Reason.

== Release ==
Meddle was released on 5 November 1971. It was later released as an LP by Mobile Fidelity Sound Lab, and in April 1989 on their "Ultradisc" gold CD format. The album was included as part of the box set Shine On on 2 November 1992. (Note: UK – EMI PFBOX 1, US – Columbia CXK 53180 S1)

It reached number three on the UK Albums Chart, but lacklustre publicity on the part of Capitol Records led to weak sales in the US, and a chart position of number 70 on the Billboard 200. "Pink Floyd had a strong following in the UK and other parts of Europe," recalled Rupert Perry, then head of A&R at Capitol. "But they needed to be bigger in the United States, where they were only doing 200,000 units. They were very much an album act – no singles – which was bad news for us. They had a high credibility factor without the sales."

On 29 November 1971, "One of These Days" was released as a 7-inch single in the US, with "Fearless" on the B-side. "One of These Days" and "Echoes" were performed in the 1972 concert film Live at Pompeii (the latter in two parts) and also on the BBC's 1971 In Concert. Meddle was certified gold by the RIAA on 29 October 1973 and then double platinum on 11 March 1994, following the added attention garnered by the band's later successes in the United States.

== Reception ==
Retrospective professional ratings
Review scores
Source	Rating
AllMusic	4.5/5 stars
Christgau's Record Guide	B−
The Daily Telegraph	4/5 stars
MusicHound Rock	3/5
Paste	8.8/10
Pitchfork	9.0/10
Q	3/5 stars
The Rolling Stone Album Guide	3.5/5 stars

On release, Meddle received generally positive reviews from music critics. Rolling Stone's Jean-Charles Costa wrote: "Meddle not only confirms lead guitarist David Gilmour's emergence as a real shaping force with the group, it states forcefully and accurately that the group is well into the growth track again", and the NME called it "an exceptionally good album". Steve Peterson of Hit Parader named "Fearless" its best song and said the album "has got to be their best ever." Ed Kelleher of Circus called it "another masterpiece by a masterful group", noting "Fearless" as "fascinating" and praising "Echoes" as "a tone poem that allows all four band members much time to stretch their muscles". However, Melody Maker was more reserved, describing the album as "a soundtrack to a non-existent movie".

In Christgau's Record Guide: Rock Albums of the Seventies (1981), Robert Christgau said Meddle was a fairly good progression over the group's previous work and featured folk songs highlighted by unique melodies, although he lamented the lyrics to "A Pillow of Winds": "The word 'behold' should never cross their filters again". In his critique of "Echoes", he believed the vocal melody imitates "Across the Universe" by the Beatles but over 23 minutes of music that flows with a "timeless calm" similar to "Interstellar Overdrive". Daryl Easlea of the BBC felt it was a similar, but more consistent and tuneful version of Atom Heart Mother, highlighted by "Echoes", which he said "dominates the entire work" and is "everything right about progressive rock; engaging, intelligent and compelling". In The New Rolling Stone Album Guide (2004), Rob Sheffield said "Echoes" showed Pink Floyd to be a more developed group than before, "coloring the slow guitar ripples with deep-in-the-studio sonic details that only the truly baked would notice, much less appreciate." Writing for AllMusic, editor Stephen Thomas Erlewine called Meddle the best album from their transitional years leading up to The Dark Side of the Moon, as it "spends most of its time with sonic textures and elongated compositions, most notably on its epic closer, 'Echoes'". He noted a "uniform tone", but not song structure, and wrote of the album's significance in the band's catalogue: "Pink Floyd were nothing if not masters of texture, and Meddle is one of their greatest excursions into little details, pointing the way to the measured brilliance of [The] Dark Side of the Moon and the entire Roger Waters era."

The album was voted number 255 in the third edition of Colin Larkin's All Time Top 1000 Albums (2000).

== Live performances ==
A short concert tour ran from October to November 1971 to promote the album in the United States and Canada, which was the most extensive tour the group had done to that point. The tour was booked by Allen Frey, who continued to organise North American tours for the group throughout the 1970s.

Some of the album's material had been played in earlier shows and the practice of playing songs before their official release later became a tradition for the group. The set list on the tour was varied, with the band playing material from their previous albums A Saucerful of Secrets, More, and Atom Heart Mother, plus the new album. The tour was the final time "Embryo", "Fat Old Sun" and "Cymbaline" were played live by the band.

== Track listing ==
All tracks are sung by David Gilmour, except where noted.

Side one
No.	Title	Writer(s)	Lead vocals	Length
1.	"One of These Days"	Gilmour; Roger Waters; Richard Wright; Nick Mason	instrumental (Note: The song is entirely instrumental, except for a spoken line by Nick Mason.)	5:57
2.	"A Pillow of Winds"	Gilmour; Waters		5:13
3.	"Fearless" (including "You'll Never Walk Alone")	Gilmour; Waters; (Richard Rodgers, Oscar Hammerstein II)		6:08
4.	"San Tropez"	Waters	Waters	3:44
5.	"Seamus"	Gilmour; Waters; Wright; Mason		2:15
Total length:				23:17

Side two
No.	Title	Writer(s)	Lead vocals	Length
6.	"Echoes"	Wright; Gilmour; Waters; Mason	Gilmour and Wright	23:30
Total length:				23:30 (46:47)

== Personnel ==
Credits adapted from sleeve notes. Track numbers noted in parentheses below are based on CD track numbering.

=== Pink Floyd ===
- David Gilmour – guitars, vocals; bass guitar (in unison with Waters) (1), harmonica (5)
- Nick Mason – drums, percussion; vocal phrase (1)
- Roger Waters – bass guitar, vocals; acoustic guitar (3, 4)
- Richard Wright – keyboards, vocals

=== Additional personnel ===
- Rob Black – engineering (Morgan Studios)
- Peter Bown – engineering (Air and EMI Studios)
- Peter Curzon – design on album remaster
- Bob Dowling – outer sleeve photos
- Doug Sax, James Guthrie – 1992 remastering at The Mastering Lab
- James Guthrie, Joel Plante – 2011 remastering at das boot recording
- Hipgnosis – band photo
- John Leckie – engineering (Air and EMI Studios)
- Tony May – inner sleeve photos
- Pink Floyd – album cover design
- Roger Quested – engineering (Morgan Studio)
- Seamus the Dog – vocals on "Seamus"
- Storm Thorgerson – design on album remaster
- Liverpool F.C. fans - chanting "You'll Never Walk Alone" on "Fearless"

== Charts ==
=== Weekly charts ===
1971 weekly chart performance for Meddle
Chart (1971)	Peak position
Australian Albums (Kent Music Report)	24
Belgian Albums (HUMO)	10
Canada Top Albums/CDs (RPM)	51
Danish Albums (IFPI)	6
Finnish Albums (Suomen Virallinen)	22
Dutch Albums (Album Top 100)	2
Italian Albums (Discografia Internazionale)	11
Spanish Albums (AFE)	21
UK Albums (Official Charts)	3
US Billboard 200	70

1972 weekly chart performance for Meddle
Chart (1972)	Peak position
Austrian Albums	4
French Albums (D'Information et de Documentation Du Disque)	7
Italian Albums (Discografia Internazionale)	7

2011 weekly chart performance for Meddle
Chart (2011)	Peak position
French Albums (SNEP)	69
Swiss Albums (Schweizer Hitparade)	76

2016 weekly chart performance for Meddle
Chart (2016)	Peak position
Hungarian Albums (MAHASZ)	36

2019 weekly chart performance for Meddle
Chart (2019)	Peak position
Polish Albums (ZPAV)	34

2026 weekly chart performance for Meddle
Chart (2026)	Peak position
German Rock & Metal Albums (Offizielle Top 100)	13

=== Year-end charts ===
1972 year-end chart performance for Meddle
Chart (1972)	Position
German Albums (Offizielle Top 100)	19

== Certifications and sales ==
Certifications and sales for Meddle
Region	Certification	Certified units/sales
France (SNEP)	2× Gold	200,000^{*}
Germany (BVMI)	Gold	250,000^{^}
Italy (FIMI)	Gold	25,000^{*}
Japan	—	70,000
United Kingdom (BPI) 1993 release	Gold	100,000^{^}
United States (RIAA)	2× Platinum	2,000,000^{^}
^{*} Sales figures based on certification alone.^{^} Shipments figures based on certification alone.
