= Feeler =

Feeler may refer to:

== Music ==
- Feeler (Pete Murray album), 2003
- Feeler (Marcella Detroit album), 1996
- Feeler (Toadies album), 2010
- The Feelers, a New Zealand rock band

== Other ==
- Antenna (biology)
- Feeler fish
- Feeler gauge
- The Feeler, a 2011 sculpture at Üsküdar University, İstanbul
