= Dan Matrazzo =

American musician

- Born: 13 February 1959 (age 67); Shinjuku-ku, Tokyo, Japan
- Education: Berklee College of Music
- Known for: Keyboard player, composer and record producer

Dan Matrazzo (born 13 February 1959), also known as "Dr. Dan Matrazzo" or simply "Dr. Dan", is an American keyboardist and pianist. He was a band member and composer for the blues musician Clarence "Gatemouth" Brown. Matrazzo started playing the piano at the age of three in 1962 and performed classical recitals while growing up in Tokyo. His uncle was a well known big band leader and bassist for Japanese TV networks.

His album Timeless, which he recorded with Brown, was nominated for a Grammy Award. Matrazzo's piano music can also be found on Brown's album Real Life.

Matrazzo was the founder, composer and producer for the band Fiji Mariners. Matrazzo has also played shows and toured with James Cotton and Taj Mahal, and has appeared on stage with Russell Malone, Lew Soloff, Phish, Blues Traveller, John Scofield, Michael Brecker, Les Claypool, Gov’t Mule, Ween, Lowell Fulson, George Porter Jr., Stanton Moore, Morphine, The Allman Brothers, Widespread Panic, and others. Matrazzo's professional journey began in 1975 as a teenager playing at sold-out arenas with the Japanese guitarist Char. In 1981 Matrazzo recorded on the album Cloudland/Pink Cloud on VAP Records with Nobuki Yoshinaga, Masayoshi Kabe, Hisato "Char" Takenaka. From there he went on touring the US, Europe, Asia and the Middle East with Clarence Brown and numerous other musical outfits, including several appearances at all major European Jazz festivals.

In the 1980s and 1990s when Matrazzo was not touring, he worked with the Atlanta-based group Life Force as educator and played concerts including the 1994 Lillehammer Winter Olympics and the Northsea Jazz Festival.

In 1992 to 1994, Matrazzo and Char reunited with the band, the Psychedelix, and toured extensively in Japan and also staged concerts in Los Angeles and New York. Together they released an album Live At NHK Hall and other DVDs and performed on 20 March at the Shibuya Public Hall in Tokyo.

In 1996 to 1995 Matrazzo performed with Jimmy Hall of Wet Willie, recording the tracks for his album Rendezvous With The Blues on Hammond B3. He also recorded on Gregg Allman's album on Chrysalis Records in 1996.

His 2000 solo release Dan on the Moon, produced by David Z, was released by Terminus Records with Sam Sims on bass, Lil' John Roberts on drums, and Warren Haynes on guitar. Dan on the Moon was considered to be the defining album of a new genre which jam fans immediately dubbed "Space Funk", though it explored many styles of music from funk and blues, soul, progressive rock, and classical piano.

From 2005 to 2011, Matrazzo focused mainly on traditional and post-bebop jazz music, but then began touring with The Looters, who are also known for backing Blue Note Records' Kristina Train, Rosa King, and Saskia Laroo. In 2015 Matrazzo and the Looters released an album on Home Grown Records.

In 2013 Matrazzo reunited with John Scofield as well as Gov't Mule at the 25th annual Christmas Jam in Asheville, North Carolina.

In 2015 Gov't Mule released the album Sco-Mule with Matrazzo on keyboards, John Scofield on guitar, and a host of other musicians including Jimmy Herring. This was recorded at the Georgia Theatre and the Roxy in Atlanta, Georgia.

Matrazzo's music has been used by MTV for opening songs for a murder and mystery show. Later in 2017, there were sessions with Corky Laing of Mountain and Chris Barron and guitarist Eric Schenkman of the Spin Doctors.
