= Dark Side of the Mule =

Live album by Gov't Mule
- Released: December 9, 2014
- Length: 88:52
- Label: Evil Teen

Gov't Mule chronology
Shout! (2013)	Dark Side of the Mule (2014)	Sco-Mule (2015)

Professional ratings
Review scores
Source	Rating
AllMusic	3.5/5 stars
PopMatters	6/10 stars

Dark Side of the Mule is a live album by Gov't Mule composed of covers of Pink Floyd songs. The album was recorded in 2008 during a three-hour gig at Boston's Orpheum Theatre on Halloween night. The title is a pun on Dark Side of the Moon, the 1973 Pink Floyd album. One of the background singers, Durga McBroom, also toured with Pink Floyd and appears on their two most recent albums.

== Release ==
Dark Side of the Mule was released as both a single CD and deluxe three-CD/DVD set.

== Track listing ==
=== Standard edition ===
Dark Side of the Mule track listing
No.	Title	Length
1.	"One of These Days"	6:15
2.	"Fearless"	5:37
3.	"Pigs on the Wing 2"	1:37
4.	"Shine On You Crazy Diamond, Pts. I – V"	13:57
5.	"Have a Cigar"	6:30
6.	"Speak to Me"	1:00
7.	"Breathe (In the Air)"	2:54
8.	"On the Run"	3:42
9.	"Time"	6:47
10.	"The Great Gig in the Sky"	5:24
11.	"Money"	7:15
12.	"Comfortably Numb"	6:16
13.	"Shine On You Crazy Diamond, Pts. VI – IX"	14:00
14.	"Wish You Were Here"	7:38

=== Deluxe edition ===
Disc 1
No.	Title	Length
1.	"Brighter Days"	7:54
2.	"Bad Little Doggie"	3:43
3.	"Brand New Angel"	7:06
4.	"Gameface"	12:02
5.	"Trane / Eternity's Breath / St. Stephen Jam"	19:17
6.	"Monkey Hill"	5:34
7.	"Child of the Earth"	6:18
8.	"Kind of Bird"	14:30

Disc 2
No.	Title	Length
1.	"One of These Days"	6:15
2.	"Fearless"	5:37
3.	"Pigs on the Wing 2"	1:37
4.	"Shine On You Crazy Diamond, Pts. I – V"	13:57
5.	"Have a Cigar"	6:30
6.	"Speak to Me"	1:00
7.	"Breathe (In the Air)"	2:54
8.	"On the Run"	3:42
9.	"Time"	6:47
10.	"The Great Gig in the Sky"	5:24
11.	"Money"	7:15
12.	"Comfortably Numb"	6:16

Disc 3
No.	Title	Length
1.	"Shine On You Crazy Diamond, Pts. VI – IX"	14:00
2.	"Wish You Were Here"	7:38
3.	"Million Miles from Yesterday"	3:44
4.	"Blind Man in the Dark"	10:43

== Personnel ==
- Warren Haynes – vocals, guitar
- Matt Abts – drums
- Danny Louis – keyboards
- Jorgen Carlsson – bass guitar
- Ron Holloway – saxophone
- Durga McBroom – background vocals
- Sophia Ramos – background vocals
- Machan Taylor – background vocals

== Charts ==
Chart performance for Dark Side of the Mule
Chart (2014–2015)	Peak position
Belgian Albums (Ultratop Flanders)	161
Dutch Albums (Album Top 100)	91
German Albums (Offizielle Top 100)	55
Swiss Albums (Schweizer Hitparade)	65
US Billboard 200	99
US Independent Albums (Billboard)	7
US Top Rock Albums (Billboard)	10
US Indie Store Album Sales (Billboard)	6
