= The Feeler =

2011 sculpture at Üsküdar University, Istanbul

- Hisseden İnsan (Turkish)
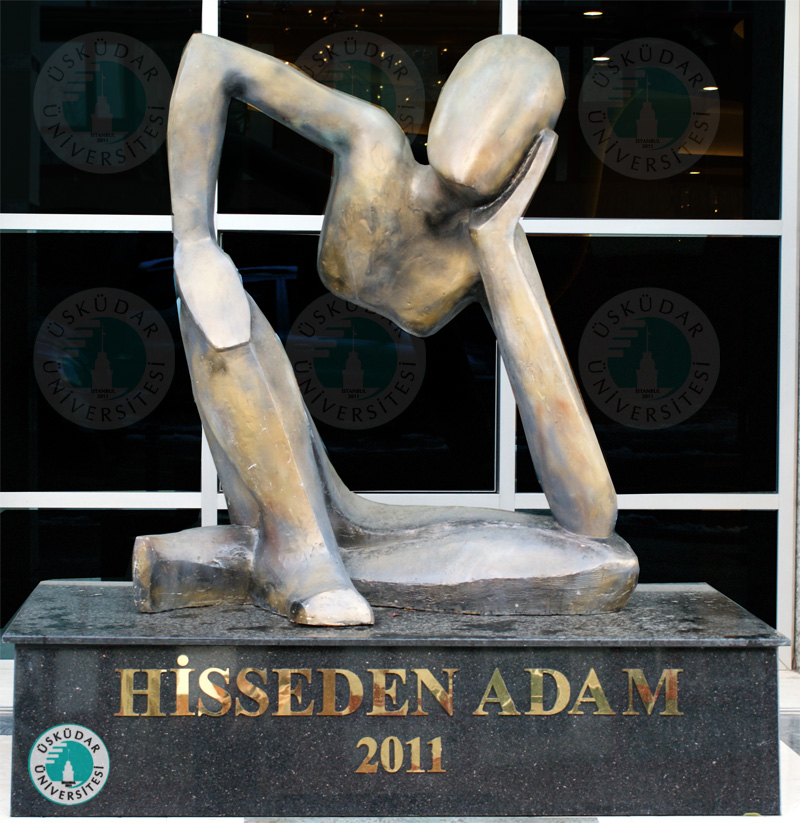
- Photo of Statue Commissioned in 2011 in front of Uskudar University Central Campus, with its original name
- Year: 2011
- Type: Sculpture
- Location: Üsküdar, Istanbul, Turkey; 41.024862°N 29.0390278°E
- Website: uskudar.edu.tr/tr/hisseden-insan

The Feeler (Turkish: Hisseden İnsan; previously Hisseden Adam) is an outdoor sculpture, located on the Üsküdar University campus in Üsküdar, Istanbul, Turkey. Installed in front of the Altunizade Central Campus, it was commissioned in 2011. Small sized versions of the sculpture are given by the university, as awards.

== Meaning ==
The Feeler is symbol about understanding the human. It is accepted today that feelings like anger, hatred, animosity, love have biochemical representations in the brain. The Feeler symbol of Üsküdar University represents activating nice feelings and maintaining good feelings instead of malicious ones. Those who can generate awareness about feelings are the lucky ones who can feel "The Feeler" and the life alike. The Feeler is the representative of human values which remind the importance of considering, helping others, getting help from others, sharing feelings in order to be happy.

== Award ==
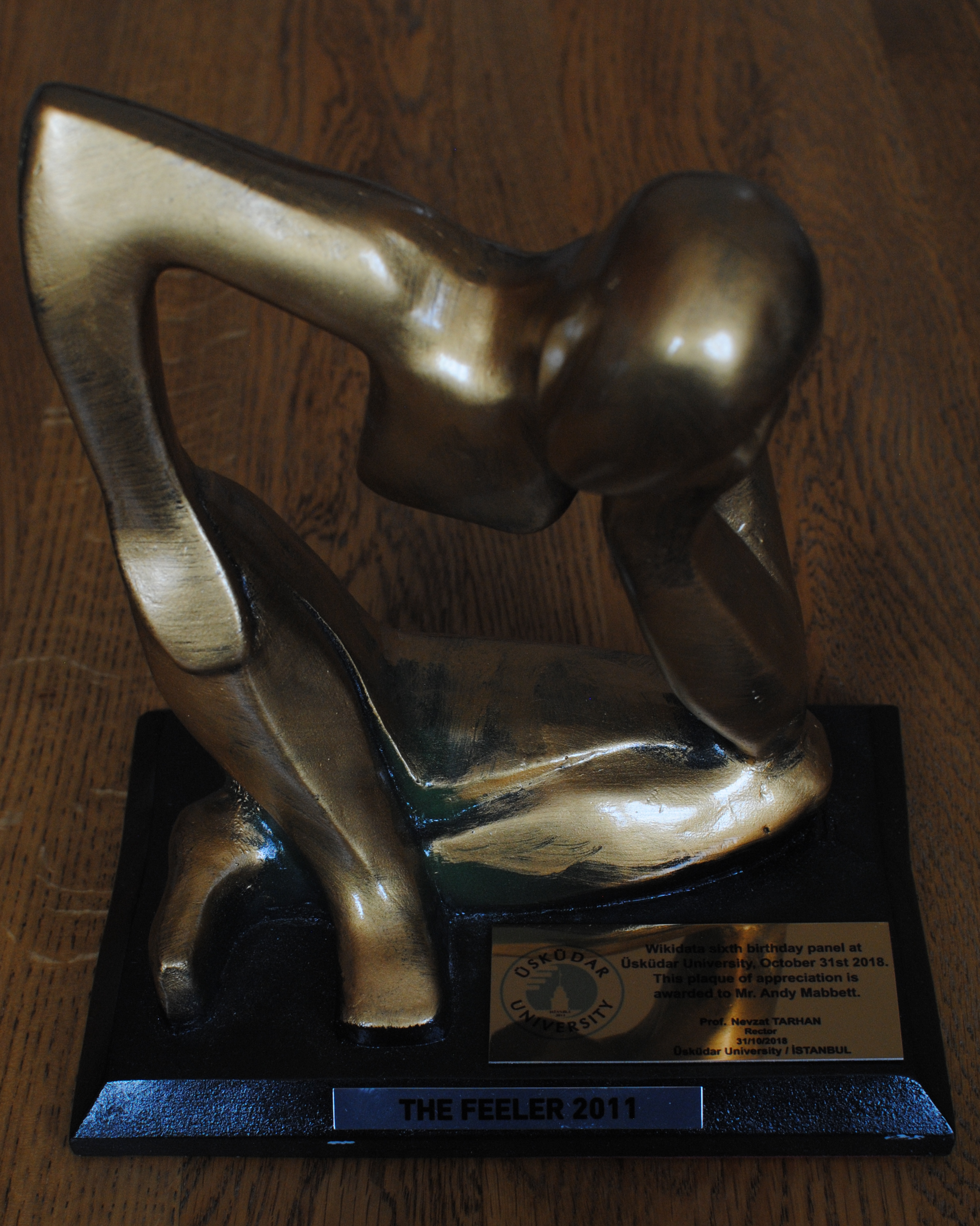
Statuette awarded to Andy Mabbett in appreciation of his lecture marking Wikidata's 6th Birthday, on 31 October 2018.

The university awards statuettes of the feeler to people who are recognized in their areas of expertise.

=== Recipients ===
- Bruce Lawrence
- Andy Mabbett
- Mustafa Somuncu
- Ceyhun Yılmaz

== Name ==
In March 2018, the statue's Turkish name was changed from Hisseden Adam ("Feeling Man") to Hisseden İnsan ("Feeling Person") to make it gender-neutral.
