= Past Present =

Past Present may refer to:

- Pastpresent, a 1989 album by Clannad
- Past Present (John Scofield album), 2015
