= Sco-Mule =

Live album by Gov't Mule featuring John Scofield
- Released: January 27, 2015
- Recorded: September 22 and 23, 1999
- Length: 153:52
- Label: Evil Teen

Gov't Mule chronology
Dark Side of the Mule (2014)	Sco-Mule (2015)	Dub Side of the Mule (2015)

John Scofield chronology
Juice (2014)	Sco-Mule (2015)	Past Present (2015)

Professional ratings
Review scores
Source	Rating
AllMusic	4.5/5 stars
The Guardian	4.5/5 stars

Sco-Mule is a live album by the American rock band Gov't Mule, recorded at two 1999 shows in Atlanta, Georgia. It features the band's original members: guitarist Warren Haynes, bass guitarist Allen Woody, and drummer Matt Abts, along with jazz guitarist John Scofield and keyboardist Dan Matrazzo.

These Atlanta performances have been widely traded, discussed and revered by Mule fans for 15 years. Sco-Mule defies both jazz and jam-band genres, "instead, it sits somewhere in-between, with everyone forgetting about artificial delineation."

== Track listing ==
Recorded at the Georgia Theatre in Athens, Georgia on September 22 and at The Roxy in Atlanta on September 23, 1999.

Sco-Mule track listing
No.	Title	Writer(s)	Length
1.	"Hottentot"	John Scofield	11:07
2.	"Tom Thumb"	Wayne Shorter	11:06
3.	"Doing It to Death"	James Brown	12:08
4.	"Birth of the Mule"	Warren Haynes, Allen Woody, Matt Abts	15:35
5.	"Sco-Mule"	Haynes	9:17
6.	"Kind of Bird"	Haynes, Dickey Betts	18:13

=== Bonus disc ===
Bonus disc
No.	Title	Writer(s)	Length
1.	"Pass the Peas"	James Brown, John Starks, Charles Bobbit	10:21
2.	"Devil Likes It Slow"	Haynes	13:03
3.	"Hottentot" (alternate version)	Scofield	11:40
4.	"Kind of Bird" (alternate version)	Haynes, Betts	18:18
5.	"Afro Blue"	Mongo Santamaria	23:04

== Personnel ==
- John Scofield – electric guitar
- Warren Haynes – electric guitar
- Jimmy Herring – electric guitar (disc 2, track 2)
- Mike Barnes – electric rhythm guitar (disc 2, track 5)
- Dan Matrazzo – keyboards
- Allen Woody – bass guitar
- Matt Abts – drums and percussion

== Charts ==
Chart performance for Sco-Mule
Chart (2015)	Peak position
Austrian Albums (Ö3 Austria)	52
Belgian Albums (Ultratop Flanders)	95
Belgian Albums (Ultratop Wallonia)	106
Dutch Albums (Album Top 100)	48
French Albums (SNEP)	158
German Albums (Offizielle Top 100)	37
Swiss Albums (Schweizer Hitparade)	50
US Billboard 200	96
US Independent Albums (Billboard)	14
US Top Rock Albums (Billboard)	16
US Indie Store Album Sales (Billboard)	5
