= Pink Floyd: The Music and the Mystery =

2010 nonfiction book by Andy Mabbett

- book cover
- Author: Andy Mabbett
- Language: English
- Subject: Pink Floyd
- Genre: non-fiction
- Published: 1 September 2010
- Publisher: Omnibus Press
- Publication place: United Kingdom
- Media type: Paperback
- Pages: 168 (first edition)
- ISBN: 9781849383707
- OCLC: 762731304
- Preceded by: The Complete Guide to the Music of Pink Floyd (1995)

Pink Floyd: The Music and the Mystery is a 2010 non-fiction book by Andy Mabbett about the English rock band Pink Floyd. The book includes a complete discography of all of the band's songs and albums as well as a timeline of important events in the band's history and other information. The book was edited by Chris Charlesworth and published as a paperback by Omnibus Press on 1 September 2010. The book is also available as an eBook from Omnibus Press.

Mabbett was formally an editor and publisher of the Pink Floyd magazine The Amazing Pudding.
