= Shout! (Gov't Mule album) =

Studio album by Gov't Mule
- Released: September 24, 2013
- Recorded: 2012–2013
- Length: 140:11
- Label: Blue Note

Gov't Mule chronology
Mulennium (2010)	Shout! (2013)	Dark Side of the Mule (2014)

Shout! is the tenth studio album by American rock band Gov't Mule. The album was released on September 24, 2013. The album is in a two-CD format. The first CD contains songs with Gov't Mule's Warren Haynes as vocalist. The second disc contains the same songs in a slightly different order, each track featuring a different guest vocalist. The album features guest appearances from Ben Harper, Elvis Costello, Dr. John, Jim James, Grace Potter, Toots Hibbert, Glenn Hughes, Ty Taylor, Dave Matthews, Myles Kennedy, and Steve Winwood.

== Critical reception ==
Professional ratings
Review scores
Source	Rating
AllMusic	3.5/5 stars
PopMatters	8/10
Rolling Stone	3.5/5 stars

PopMatters journalist Neil Kelly said "Shout! has Gov't Mule showing the highest respect to all forms of classic roots, as is the case with arguably all of their studio efforts." David Fricke of Rolling Stone wrote "Gov't Mule, led by singer-guitarist Warren Haynes, write solid rock songs in the power-blues, heroic-vocal tradition of Free and Led Zeppelin." Thom Jurek from AllMusic stated "Shout! would have been better served if the best of the guest performances were integrated into the formal album. For fans, the first disc has plenty of exciting material to offer: it sounds great, the writing is excellent, there are new musical directions, and, as expected, there is terrific playing throughout."

== Commercial performance ==
The album debuted at number 32 on the Billboard 200 chart, with first-week sales of 14,120 copies in the United States. On the Billboard Top Rock Albums chart it peaked at number 11.

== Track listing ==
Disc 1
No.	Title	Length
1.	"World Boss"	5:24
2.	"No Reward"	4:54
3.	"Whisper in Your Soul"	5:11
4.	"Captured"	9:04
5.	"Scared to Live"	6:16
6.	"Stoop So Low"	8:23
7.	"Forsaken Savior"	6:18
8.	"Done Got Wise"	6:11
9.	"When the World Gets Small"	7:45
10.	"Funny Little Tragedy"	4:15
11.	"Bring On the Music"	11:05

Disc 2
No.	Title	Length
1.	"World Boss" (with Ben Harper)	4:31
2.	"Funny Little Tragedy" (with Elvis Costello)	4:11
3.	"Stoop So Low" (with Dr. John)	10:00
4.	"Captured" (with Jim James)	5:45
5.	"Whisper in Your Soul" (with Grace Potter)	5:10
6.	"Scared to Live" (with Toots Hibbert)	5:53
7.	"No Reward" (with Glenn Hughes)	5:14
8.	"Bring On the Music" (with Ty Taylor)	6:42
9.	"Forsaken Savior" (with Dave Matthews)	5:18
10.	"Done Got Wise" (with Myles Kennedy)	6:11
11.	"When the World Gets Small" (with Steve Winwood)	6:35

== Charts ==
Chart performance for Shout!
Chart (2013)	Peak position
Austrian Albums (Ö3 Austria)	28
Belgian Albums (Ultratop Flanders)	100
Belgian Albums (Ultratop Wallonia)	116
Dutch Albums (Album Top 100)	66
French Albums (SNEP)	69
German Albums (Offizielle Top 100)	16
Italian Albums (FIMI)	82
Swiss Albums (Schweizer Hitparade)	36
US Billboard 200	32
US Top Rock Albums (Billboard)	11
US Indie Store Album Sales (Billboard)	7
