= Peter Bown =

- Born: 1926; London, England
- Died: 1997 (aged 70–71)

Peter Bown (1926 – 1997) was a British engineer of sound, who has worked extensively as a sound technician, engineer, mixing manager, etc., in a long list of musical productions, from psychedelic rock to classical music; of his collaborations some stand out with The Hollies, The Beatles, Pink Floyd, Syd Barrett, or even the Montserrat Caballé or Plácido Domingo. Among the numerous studios where he has worked, the Abbey Road stand out and the EMI Studios in London.

== Biography and musical production ==
Bown was born in 1926 in London, England. He began working as a sound engineer within the world of the music industry in the mid-1960s. He was hired by Pink Floyd as a sound engineer at EMI Studios (now known as Abbey Road Studios) in the late 1960s.

During his long career with Pink Floyd, Bown was a key collaborator on many of the group's albums. He worked on albums such as The Piper at the Gates of Dawn, Meddle, Atom Heart Mother, The Dark Side of the Moon (1973), Wish You Were Here (1975), Animals (1977), and The Wall.

== Productions ==
- 1967: The Piper at the Gates of Dawn, Pink Floyd
- 1970: Barrett, Syd Barrett
- 1970: Atom Heart Mother, Pink Floyd
- 1970: Let It Be, The Beatles
- 1974: The Madcap Laughs/Barrett, Syd Barrett
- 1988: Past Masters, The Beatles
- 1995: Diva: Montserrat Caballe, Montserrat Caballé
- 1997: Best of Plácido Domingo, Plácido Domingo
