= Stoned Side of the Mule Vol. 1 & 2 =

Live album by Gov't Mule
- Released: April 17, 2015
- Recorded: October 31, 2009
- Venue: Tower Theater, Upper Darby Township, Pennsylvania, U.S.
- Length: 71:00
- Label: Evil Teen

Gov't Mule chronology
Dub Side of the Mule (2015)	Stoned Side of the Mule Vol. 1 & 2 (2015)	The Tel-Star Sessions (2016)

Stoned Side of the Mule Vol. 1 & 2 is a live cover album by American band Gov't Mule, released on April 17, 2015, through Mascot Label Group in Europe and Evil Teen Records in the US. It consists of covers of the Rolling Stones, performed during Gov't Mule's Stones-themed Halloween show at the Tower Theater in Upper Darby Township, Pennsylvania on October 31, 2009. Initially released only on vinyl, it was released digitally and on CD in May 2022.

== Critical reception ==
In a review of the first volume, Glenn BurnSilver of Relix wrote that "Stoned straight-out rocks. Rooted in the blues, these seven tracks are perfectly suited for the high-octane side of Gov't Mule, particularly "Monkey Man" and "Doo Doo Doo Doo Doo (Heartbreaker)" (complete with tell-tale background vocals and full horn accompaniment). And while there's only so much one can add to classic Stones tracks short of techno remixes, Mule locks it in tight."

== Track listing ==
All tracks are written by Mick Jagger and Keith Richards, except "Ventilator Blues", written by Jagger, Richards and Mick Taylor, and "Play with Fire", credited to Nanker Phelge.

Stoned Side of the Mule Vol. 1 & 2 track listing
No.	Title	Length
1.	"Under My Thumb"	4:47
2.	"Monkey Man"	5:20
3.	"Doo Doo Doo Doo Doo (Heartbreaker)"	4:40
4.	"Paint It Black"	4:13
5.	"Angie"	4:41
6.	"Ventilator Blues"	7:32
7.	"Shattered"	4:19
8.	"Wild Horses"	6:25
9.	"Bitch"	4:59
10.	"Slave"	8:05
11.	"Play with Fire"	2:54
12.	"Can't You Hear Me Knocking"	8:07
13.	"Brown Sugar"	5:04
Total length:		71:06

== Charts ==
Chart performance for Stoned Side of the Mule Vol. 1 & 2
Chart (2015–2022)	Peak position
Austrian Albums (Ö3 Austria)	54
Belgian Albums (Ultratop Wallonia)	190
German Albums (Offizielle Top 100)	35
Swiss Albums (Schweizer Hitparade)	91
