= Luck and Strange (tour) =

2024 concert tour by David Gilmour

- Tour by David Gilmour
- Location: Europe; North America
- Associated album: Luck and Strange
- Start date: 27 September 2024
- End date: 10 November 2024
- Legs: 1
- No. of shows: 23

David Gilmour concert chronology
- Rattle That Lock Tour (2015–2016); Luck and Strange (2024)

Luck and Strange was a concert tour by English musician David Gilmour to support his fifth solo album, Luck and Strange (2024). The tour was Gilmour's shortest solo tour, at only 21 concerts, held in Rome, London, Los Angeles and New York.

== Background and development ==
Gilmour said that he had replaced some of the musicians in the touring band, as he felt “it was all too robotic, and some people would have been better off in a Pink Floyd tribute band. So I thought we’d get people who are genuinely creative and give them a little more space." In August 2024 Gilmour told Rolling Stone that he would like to have his daughter Romany join the tour to sing "Between Two Points" but said it would have to work around her university commitments; she subsequently appeared at all dates.

Dates for the tour were released in stages with early access to tickets given to those who pre-ordered the Luck and Strange album via Gilmour's online shop. Dates for London's Royal Albert Hall were announced first, followed by dates for the Circus Maximus in Rome. Four US dates were announced; two for the Hollywood Bowl and two for Madison Square Garden, with a third New York date added just days later. On 16 May 2024 another date each for Los Angeles and New York were added due to high demand. In June Gilmour announced another LA show, this time at the newly built Intuit Dome. On 11 September 2024 two so-called rehearsal shows at the Brighton Centre were announced for 20 and 21 September 2024, with each show limited to 1500 attendees. The tour was generally well received by critics.

Prior to the tour, Gilmour had said he did not want to play much of the 1970s Pink Floyd material on this tour and that the albums A Momentary Lapse of Reason (1987) and The Division Bell (1994) should be represented. He also said at least one song from the 1960s would be played, which had usually been "Astronomy Domine" on previous tours. In an August 2024 interview with Rolling Stone, asked about playing songs from the 1970s Pink Floyd albums, Gilmour said: "One has to wake up to reality [...] I will be doing one or two things from that time. I know people love them, and I love playing them. I’ll be doing "Wish You Were Here," [...] and some of the things that started with me anyway." When asked if he would be playing "Comfortably Numb" Gilmour said, "Yeah, quite likely. Quite likely." He added that he would not be performing "Money" from The Dark Side of the Moon (1973), nor "Run Like Hell" from The Wall.

On 6 September 2024, to mark the release of the album, Gilmour and his band broadcast a livestream via YouTube during which they performed "Between Two Points", "Breathe", "Time"/"Breathe (Reprise)" and "Dark and Velvet Nights". During the beginning of the tour, almost all of the Luck and Strange album was played, omitting only "Sings" and "A Single Spark", which were added on 1 October and 14 October, respectively, from which point the whole album would be played, albeit scattered throughout the show.

== Set list ==
The following set list was obtained from the concert on September 27, 2024, at Circus Maximus in Rome, Italy. It does not represent all concerts through the tour.

Set 1

1. "5 A.M."
2. "Black Cat"
3. "Luck and Strange"
4. "Speak to Me" / "Breathe"
5. "Time"
6. "Breathe (Reprise)"
7. "Fat Old Sun"
8. "Marooned"
9. "Wish You Were Here"
10. "Vita Brevis"
11. "Between Two Points"
12. "High Hopes"

Set 2

13. "Sorrow"
14. "The Piper's Call"
15. "A Great Day for Freedom"
16. "In Any Tongue"
17. "The Great Gig in the Sky"
18. "A Boat Lies Waiting"
19. "Coming Back to Life"
20. "Dark and Velvet Nights"
21. "Scattered"

Encore

22. "Comfortably Numb"

== Broadcasts and recordings ==
On July 29, 2025, Gilmour announced that the Rome concerts had been filmed and would be shown in cinemas as a film on September 17, and released the performance of "Sorrow". The live album The Luck and Strange Concerts and the video Live at the Circus Maximus, Rome were released on October 17.

== Tour dates ==
List of 2024 concerts, showing date, city, country and venue
Date (2024)	City	Country	Venue
20 September	Brighton	England	Brighton Centre
21 September	Brighton	England	Brighton Centre
27 September	Rome	Italy	Circus Maximus
28 September	Rome	Italy	Circus Maximus
29 September	Rome	Italy	Circus Maximus
1 October	Rome	Italy	Circus Maximus
2 October	Rome	Italy	Circus Maximus
3 October	Rome	Italy	Circus Maximus
9 October	London	England	Royal Albert Hall
10 October	London	England	Royal Albert Hall
11 October	London	England	Royal Albert Hall
12 October	London	England	Royal Albert Hall
14 October	London	England	Royal Albert Hall
15 October	London	England	Royal Albert Hall
25 October	Inglewood (Note: Labeled as Los Angeles in promotional material.)	United States	Intuit Dome
29 October	Los Angeles	United States	Hollywood Bowl
30 October	Los Angeles	United States	Hollywood Bowl
31 October	Los Angeles	United States	Hollywood Bowl
4 November	New York City	United States	Madison Square Garden
5 November	New York City	United States	Madison Square Garden
6 November	New York City	United States	Madison Square Garden
9 November	New York City	United States	Madison Square Garden
10 November	New York City	United States	Madison Square Garden

== Personnel ==
- David Gilmour – guitars, lead vocals (except "Between Two Points" and "The Great Gig in the Sky"), backing vocals on "Between Two Points"
- Guy Pratt – bass, backing vocals, co-lead vocals on "Comfortably Numb"
- Greg Phillinganes – keyboards, backing vocals, co-lead vocals on "Time"
- Rob Gentry – keyboards, backing vocals
- Ben Worsley – guitars, backing vocals, co-lead vocals on "In Any Tongue" and "Time"
- Adam Betts – drums
- Romany Gilmour - backing vocals, harp and lead vocals on "Between Two Points", co-lead vocals on "The Great Gig in the Sky"
- The Webb Sisters
  - Hattie Webb - backing vocals, harp, co-lead vocals on "The Great Gig in the Sky"
  - Charley Webb - backing vocals, guitar, ukulele, co-lead vocals on "The Great Gig in the Sky"
- Louise Marshall – backing vocals, co-lead vocals and piano on "The Great Gig in the Sky"
