= Fearless (Pink Floyd song) =

1971 song by Pink Floyd

- Italian vinyl single

Song by Pink Floyd

from the album Meddle
- A-side: "One of These Days"
- Released: 29 November 1971
- Recorded: 9 May – 11 September 1971
- Studio: AIR, Abbey Road, and Morgan (London)
- Genre: Folk rock; progressive rock
- Length: 6:08
- Label: Capitol; Harvest
- Songwriters: David Gilmour; Roger Waters
- Producer: Pink Floyd

"Fearless" is the third track on the 1971 album Meddle by Pink Floyd. It is a slow acoustic guitar-driven song written by David Gilmour and Roger Waters, and includes audio of Liverpool F.C. football fans singing "You'll Never Walk Alone".

== Recording ==
The song's slow tempo and mellow acoustic sound bear similarities to some of the other tracks on the first side of the album Meddle. Roger Waters performed the acoustic guitar parts using an open tuning in G major, taught to Waters by former member Syd Barrett.

Near the beginning and at the end of the song, a field recording of fans in Liverpool's Anfield singing "You'll Never Walk Alone" is superimposed over the music. This Rodgers and Hammerstein song became the anthem of Liverpool F.C. after Gerry and the Pacemakers had a number one hit on the UK Singles Chart with their recording.

== Other releases ==
Although it was not released as a single in the UK and never played live, it was released as the B-side of the single "One of These Days" in 1971. Roger Waters briefly resurrected the song for a small number of shows in 2016, and the song was played by Nick Mason's Saucerful of Secrets on their tours in 2018, 2019, 2022, and 2024.

This song was one of several to be considered for the band's 2001 greatest hits album, Echoes: The Best of Pink Floyd, but was ultimately rejected for inclusion.

== Reception ==
In a review for the Meddle album, Jean-Charles Costa of Rolling Stone described "Fearless" as "a clever spoof" that "leads up to a classic crowd rendition of Rodgers & Hammerstein's 'You'll Never Walk Alone'." Classic Rock Review described "Fearless" as "the best overall song on the album and talks about meeting challenges in the face of adversity." They went on saying "Fearless" is "highlighted by Gilmour’s calm yet strong guitar strumming and the odd beat from drummer Nick Mason."

== Other performances ==
Mason has performed the song live, with his band Nick Mason's Saucerful of Secrets. A recording is included on their 2020 live album Live at the Roundhouse.

Gov't Mule covered the song on their live album of Pink Floyd covers Dark Side of the Mule. The title of the album is a pun on The Dark Side of the Moon, the 1973 Pink Floyd album.

== Personnel ==
- David Gilmour – double-tracked vocals, acoustic and electric guitars
- Roger Waters – bass guitar, acoustic guitar
- Richard Wright – piano
- Nick Mason – drums, tambourine

with:

- Liverpool F.C. Fans Kop – chanting "You'll Never Walk Alone"

== In popular culture ==
- In Richard Linklater's film Everybody Wants Some!! (2016), stoner/philosopher Charlie Willoughby (Wyatt Russell) plays Pink Floyd's "Fearless" for his housemates while praising the arrangement.
- After Liverpool F.C. won the 2025 Premier League title, BBC's Match of the Day played the song at part of the end credits montage.
