= Dub Side of the Mule =

Live album by Gov't Mule
- Released: April 17, 2015
- Recorded: December 31, 2006
- Venue: Beacon Theatre, New York City
- Genre: Reggae
- Length: 72:39
- Label: Evil Teen

Gov't Mule chronology
Sco-Mule (2014)	Dub Side of the Mule (2015)	Stoned Side of the Mule Vol. 1 & 2 (2015)

Dub Side of the Mule is a live album by American band Gov't Mule, released on April 4, 2015, through Mascot Label Group in Europe and Evil Teen Records in the US. It was recorded on December 31, 2006, at the Beacon Theatre in New York City. The album was released in a 12-track standard edition (consisting of the middle set of the night) and a 34-track deluxe edition (consisting of all three sets performed on the night), with the standard edition featuring a reggae set led by Jamaican singer Toots Hibbert singing his own songs as well as several covers, including a version of Radiohead's "Let Down" and Gov't Mule's "Soulshine".

== Critical reception ==
Professional ratings
Review scores
Source	Rating
All About Jazz	4.5/5 stars
AllMusic	4/5 stars
Glide Magazine	8/10

Thom Jurek of AllMusic remarked that Hibbert "is in excellent voice throughout, living up to his reputation as one of the greatest reggae singers of all time", and went on to say "The mighty heavy Mule playing reggae isn't as odd as it might initially seem; rhythmically, they are one of the tightest bands in the business, and groove is in everything they do." Jurek concluded that Dub Side of the Mule stands out among Gov't Mule's live releases "because it reflects the sound of a singular rock band reveling in their collaboration with a reggae legend". Doug Collette of Glide Magazine wrote that "the initial set, in fact, stands as a template for Gov't Mule live at this juncture of their career", remarking that the reggae middle set is an "exercise in style" during which "the level of surprise that has always earmarked Gov't Mule concerts becomes evident with two Otis Redding songs". Collette concluded that during the cover of Radiohead's "Let Down", the band display their "eclecticism, not to mention the simpatico with their guests". John Kelman of All About Jazz described the reggae set as "just one more example of Gov't Mule being far more than a Southern blues- based jam band"—instead becoming "a reggae powerhouse". Kelman felt that in all, the album "might seem to be closer to form than its jazz-informed predecessor", Sco-Mule (2015).

== Track listing ==
Dub Side of the Mule standard edition track listing
No.	Title	Length
1.	"I'm a Ram"	6:21
2.	"54-46 Was My Number"	5:02
3.	"Hard to Handle"	5:12
4.	"True Love Is Hard to Find"	6:04
5.	"Pressure Drop"	4:31
6.	"Let Down"	2:38
7.	"I've Got Dreams to Remember"	5:55
8.	"Reggae Got Soul"	7:26
9.	"Hard Road"	9:53
10.	"Happy New Year"	0:59
11.	"Turn On Your Love Light"	6:38
12.	"Reggae Soulshine"	12:00
Total length:		72:39

== Charts ==
Chart performance for Dub Side of the Mule
Chart (2015)	Peak position
Austrian Albums (Ö3 Austria)	60
Belgian Albums (Ultratop Wallonia)	165
Dutch Albums (Album Top 100)	81
French Albums (SNEP)	135
German Albums (Offizielle Top 100)	28
US Independent Albums (Billboard)	23
US Top Rock Albums (Billboard)	38
