= Intrepid Aviation =

Former museum in Essex, England

Coordinates: 51.7198°N 0.1451°E

Intrepid Aviation was an aviation museum based in hangar #4 in North Weald Airfield in North Weald, Essex, England. It was founded by David Gilmour of the rock band Pink Floyd, to own and operate his collection of vintage aircraft. It was run and operated by display pilot Brendan Walsh, formally a sound engineer and tour manager, and close friend of David Gilmour.

Gilmour's company went on to be a major player in the airshow business staging the Thurrock and North Weald airshows in addition to providing aircraft to perform at airshows around Europe during the 1990s. During this period Brendan Walsh formed the innovative 'Red Stars Race Team' that consisted of 10 Yak 52 Russian aircraft that staged spectacular pylon races at airshows in the UK. The Intrepid Aviation Company also supplied aircraft, pilots studio facilities and consultancy services to the film industry for over 80 productions including Steven Spielberg's Band of Brothers.

Gilmour sold the company after it became more and more commercial and less of a hobby:

Intrepid Aviation was a way for me to make my hobby pay for itself a little bit, but gradually over a few years Intrepid Aviation became a business because you have to be businesslike about it. Suddenly I found instead of it being a hobby and me enjoying myself, it was a business, and so I sold it. I don't have Intrepid Aviation any more. I just have a nice old biplane that I pop up, wander around the skies in sometimes...
