= Judith Trim =

English studio potter

- Born: 11 October 1943; Cambridge, England
- Died: 9 January 2001 (aged 57); London, England
- Other names: Judy; Jude
- Education: Bath Academy of Art
- Occupation: Studio potter
- Spouses: Roger Waters (m. 1969; div. 1975); Leonard Hessing (m. 1996)
- Children: 1

Judith Trim (11 October 1943 – 9 January 2001, also known as Jude or Judy, and for a while by her first married name, as Jude Waters) was an English studio potter. From 1969 to 1975, she was married to Roger Waters of the rock band Pink Floyd, her childhood sweetheart.

== Biography ==
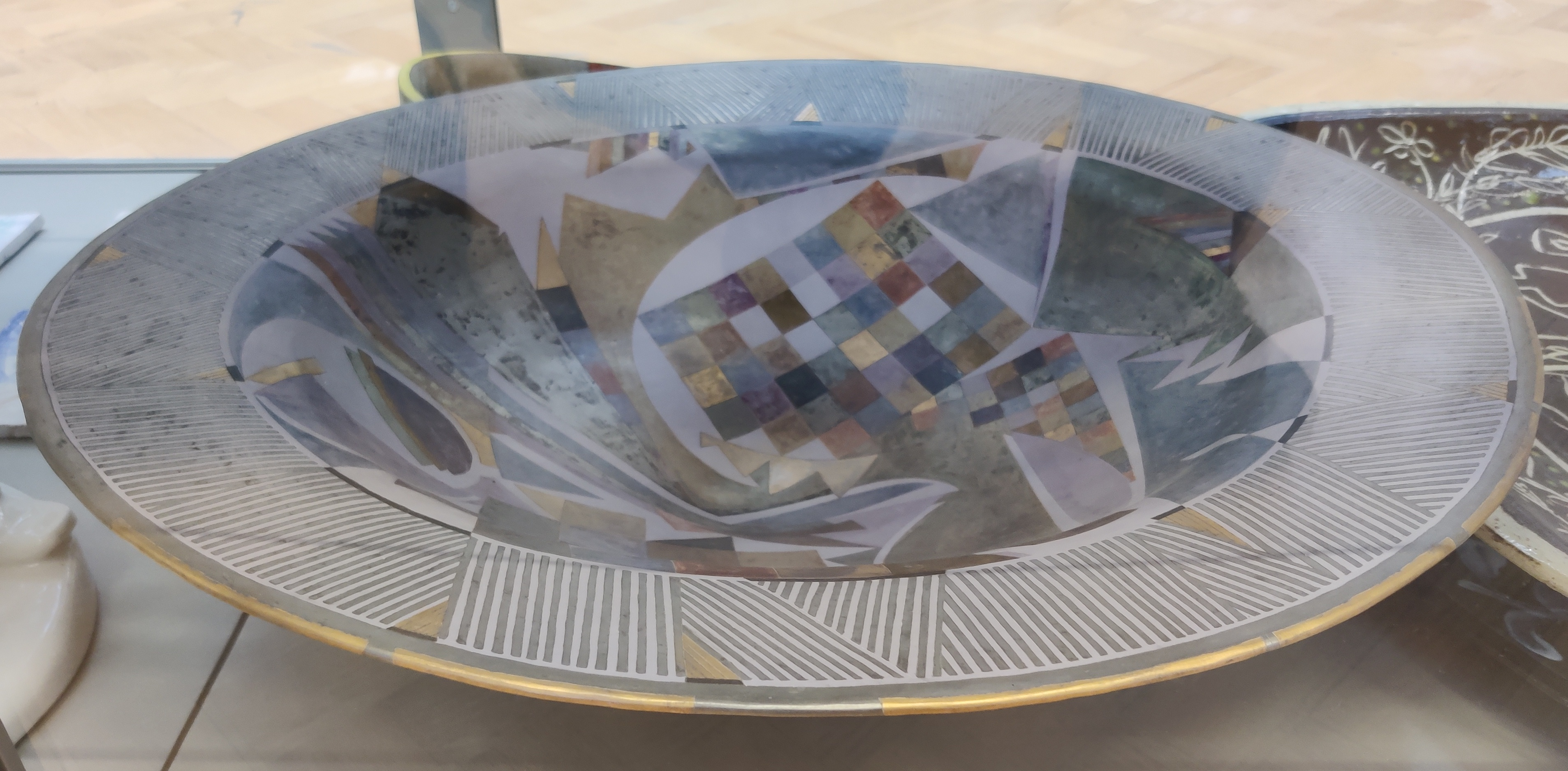
Swaddled Mauve, made 1992, displayed as part of the Victoria and Albert Museum's permanent collection

Trim's father was a research scientist at the University of Cambridge, but encouraged her to concentrate on art. She took A-levels in the arts and natural sciences at Cambridge's County High School for Girls, and then studied at Bath Academy of Art, Corsham. During her time with Waters, she worked as an art teacher, including a period during the mid to late 1960s at Walthamstow High School for Girls and Dame Alice Owen's Girls' Grammar School in Islington, North London.

She was shown on the gatefold sleeve of the original release of Pink Floyd's 1969 album Ummagumma, but was excised from subsequent CD reissues. The uncropped picture was restored for the album's inclusion in the box set Oh, by the Way. Waters says that when he played her the finished recording of The Dark Side of the Moon, she burst into tears, which Waters saw as an indication that the work would be successful. He has admitted to infidelities during the marriage, and to his regret that they lost him his wife, and describes "the beginnings of the end of that marriage" as occurring in Greece in the summer of 1974. They had no children together.

Following her divorce from Waters, she spent ten years living alone in London, concentrating on her pottery, focusing on coiled pots. She held an exhibition at the Anatol Orient gallery in Portobello Road, London, in 1989, and others at Contemporary Applied Art, Contemporary Ceramics and Ruth Coram Arts. Her work is in the collection of museums such as the Los Angeles County Museum of Art, Norwich Castle, the Ashmolean Museum, the Fitzwilliam Museum. the Shipley Museum and the Victoria and Albert Museum. Some of her work was sold through the Crafts Council shop at the Victoria and Albert Museum. She signed her pottery with the initials "JT", in a circle.

In 1996 she married the architect and painter Leonard Hessing, with whom she had one son, Theo. She died on 9 January 2001, from breast cancer.
