= Everything Under the Sun (book) =

Book about Pink Floyd

Everything Under the Sun: The Complete Guide to Pink Floyd
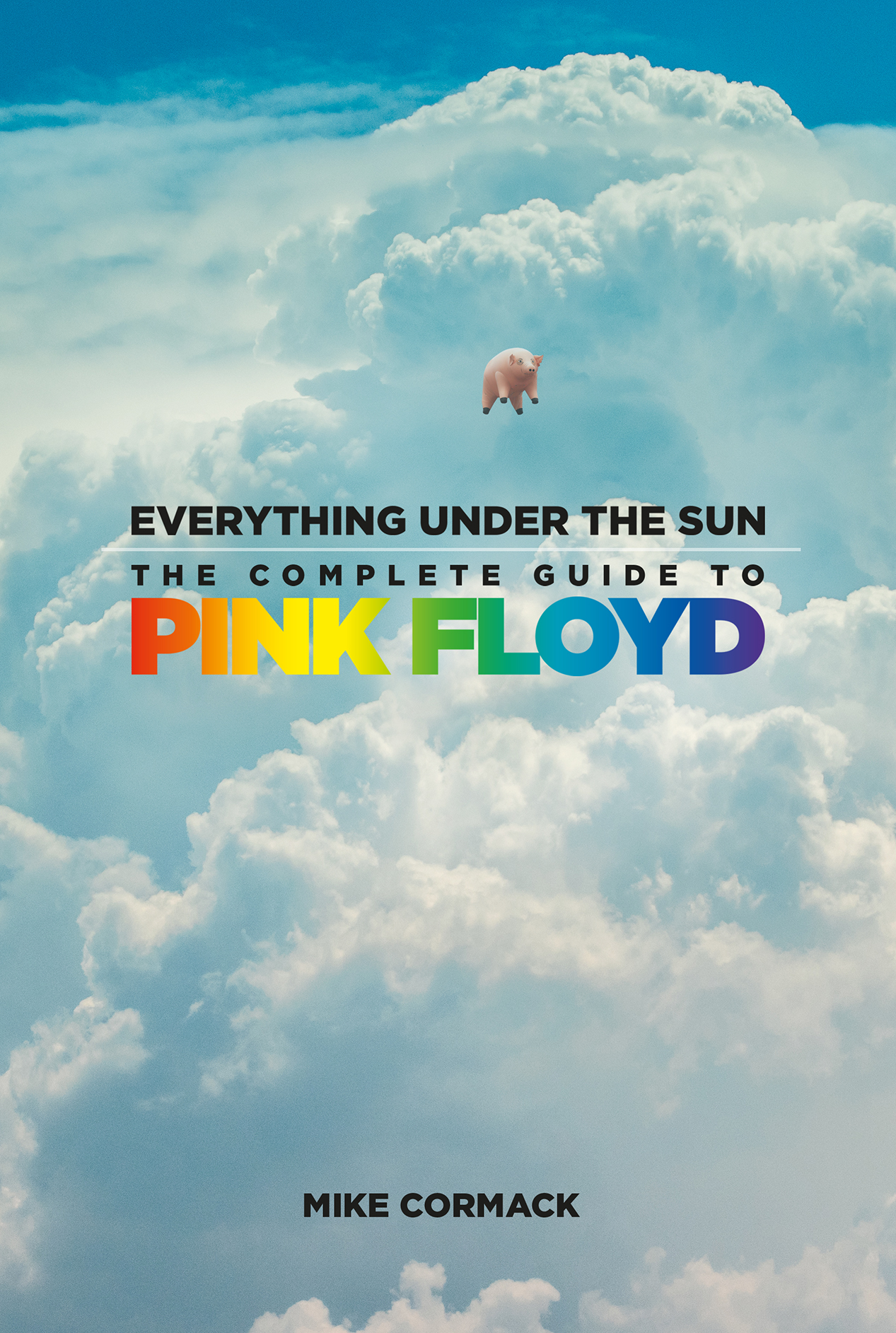
- Hardcover edition
- Language: English
- Publisher: The History Press
- Publication date: September 26, 2024
- Media type: Print (hardback)
- Pages: 419
- ISBN: 978-1803995359

Everything Under the Sun: The Complete Guide to Pink Floyd is a book published in 2024. It was written by Mike Cormack and published by The History Press.

The book is in four parts: the first part analyses all the recorded and released songs of Pink Floyd. The second is a timeline of all of Pink Floyd's concerts and release dates, matched with concurrent musical and world events. The third is a guide to the best bootleg recording available for every concert, numbering over 500 out of a possible 1200 gigs. The final section is interviews with bassist Guy Pratt, producer James Guthrie and Steve Mac, the leader of the Australian Pink Floyd Show. A paperback edition was released in January 2026.

== Reviews ==
Rolling Stone said, "To dig deeper [into Pink Floyd], check out Mike Cormack's book Everything Under the Sun: The Complete Guide to Pink Floyd."

Prog magazine said the book "seeks to be a definitive volume in the Floyd canon: a high-level analysis of the band's music and, as it says, the first serious survey of their work and achievements" and that "its ambition must be admired, and its place on that fat old shelf is assured".

Classic Rock magazine said "Cormack provides a staggering amount of description and historical context behind the songs".

Record Collector said "as entertainingly opinionated as he is, his conclusions are always cogently argued, exhaustively annotated and often extremely insightful" and noted that the bootleg guide was "just as absorbing".

A Fleeting Glimpse website (dedicated to Pink Floyd) said "there's a phenomenal quantity of footnotes, enough to impress even the most ardent Terry Pratchett fan. The breadth and scope of these footnotes is astonishing, as they encompass a myriad of literary references, statistical information, anecdotes, pithy quotes and pub quiz style factoids" and concluded by saying, "Cormack not only succinctly sums up the appeal of Pink Floyd's music, but also reminds us what made them colourful and dark, edgy and hilarious, terrible and brilliant all at once."

The Spectator magazine said, "the author’s love and respect for all things Pink shine through. And fair play to him, he has heard a lot of bootlegs."

== Author ==
Mike Cormack is headteacher of an international school in China. He has reviewed books for outlets such as South China Morning Post, The China Project, The Spectator, The Times Literary Supplement, and Literary Review. In March 2025, he published a volume of poetry titled Beyond Report – Poems of Distance and Meaning. He comes from Buckie in Scotland.
