= The Amazing Pudding =

Fan magazine, 1983–1993

- Editor: Ivor Trueman; Andy Mabbett; Bruno MacDonald; Dave Walker
- Categories: Rock music fanzine
- Frequency: Six per year
- Publisher: Ivor Trueman; Andy Mabbett; Bruno MacDonald; Dave Walker
- Founder: Ivor Trueman
- First issue: 1983
- Final issue Number: 1993; 60
- Country: United Kingdom
- Based in: Birmingham
- ISSN: 0951-8304
- OCLC: 226127235

The Amazing Pudding (1983–1993) was a British fan magazine devoted to Pink Floyd, Roger Waters, and the solo careers of other Pink Floyd band members, including Syd Barrett. It was seen as being the main fanzine of Pink Floyd during the time of its publication. Journalist Stuart Maconie wrote about The Amazing Pudding as part of a feature in the April 1993 issue of Q.

== History ==
The title, The Amazing Pudding, was originally a working title for Pink Floyd's 1970 "Atom Heart Mother" suite.

The magazine was established by Ivor Trueman and was co-edited and published, variously, by Trueman (issues 1–17, 1983–), Andy Mabbett (issues 2–60, 1983–1993), Bruno MacDonald (issues 24–60, 1987–1993), and Dave Walker (issues 13–60, –1993), for ten years and 60 issues.

MacDonald, who started writing for the magazine starting with issue 15, described the self-published and self-distributed publication – available in the United Kingdom at large record stores like HMV, Tower Records, and Virgin among others – as being purely independent, illustrated by its irreverent take on the band and its members.

== Associated publications ==
Trueman went on to publish the Syd Barrett fanzine called Opel before co-founding Delerium Records in 1991.

Mabbett wrote three books on Pink Floyd: Pink Floyd: The Visual Documentary (1994, with Miles), The Complete Guide to the Music of Pink Floyd (1995), and Pink Floyd: The Music and the Mystery (2010). Mabbett also wrote the section on Pink Floyd in the official program for the band's 1996 induction into the US Rock and Roll Hall of Fame. Mabbett appears as a Pink Floyd expert in the documentary Whatever Happened to Pink Floyd?

MacDonald also edited a Sidgwick & Jackson book (later republished by Da Capo Press) that was an anthology of collected writings about the band called Pink Floyd: Through the Eyes of... the Band, Its Fans, Friends, and Foes (1996).
