= David Gilmour =

English musician (born 1946)

David Gilmour CBE
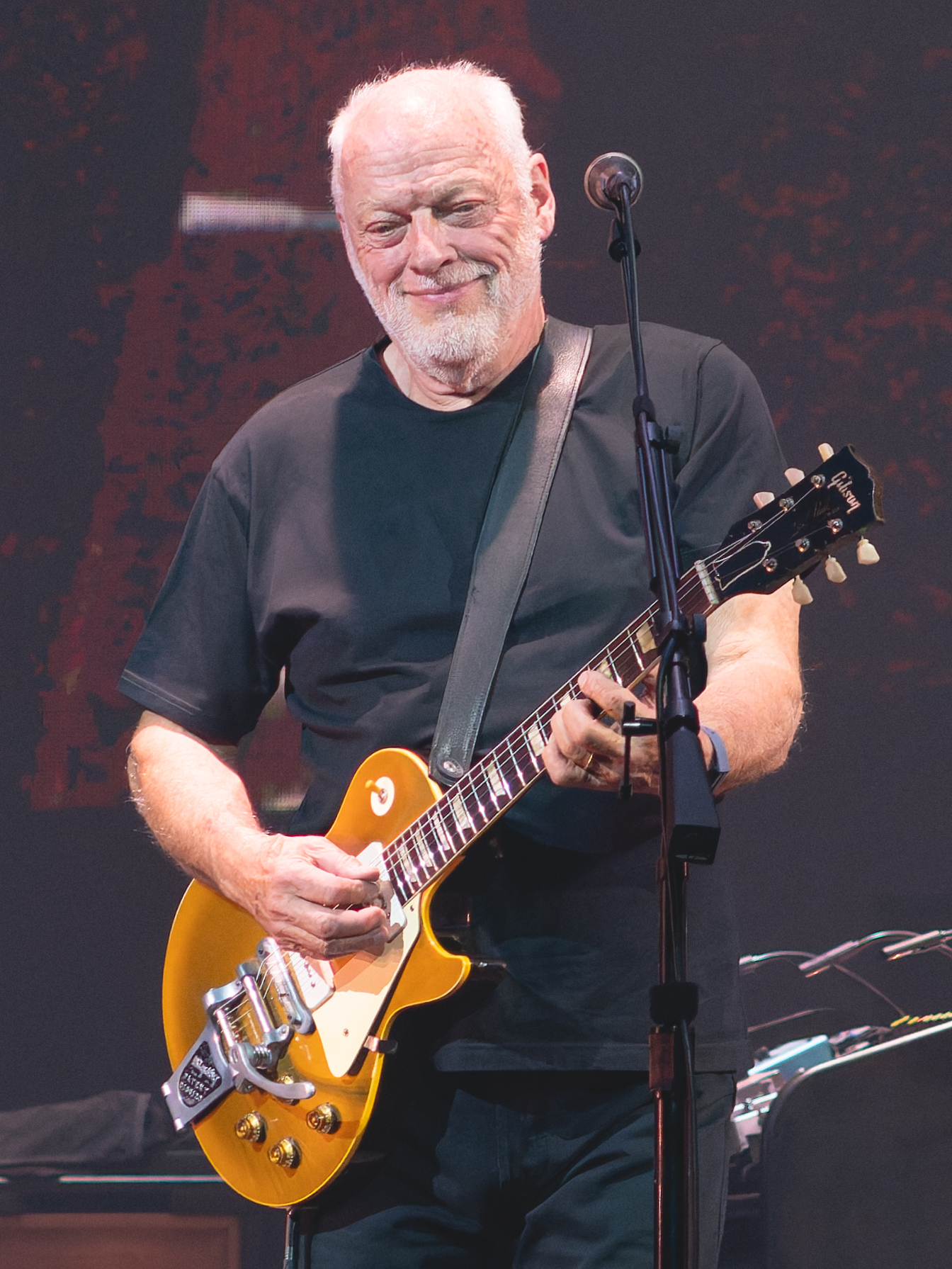
- Gilmour at the Royal Albert Hall in 2024
- Born: David Jon Gilmour; 6 March 1946 (age 80); Cambridge, England
- Occupations: Musician; singer; songwriter
- Years active: 1963–present
- Spouses: Virginia "Ginger" Hasenbein (m. 1975; div. 1990) Polly Samson (m. 1994)
- Children: 8
- Musical career
- Genres: Progressive rock; psychedelic rock; art rock; blues rock
- Instruments: Guitar; vocals
- Works: Discography
- Labels: EMI Columbia; Harvest; Capitol; Columbia; Sony; EMI
- Member of: Pink Floyd
- Formerly of: Jokers Wild; Deep End
- Website: davidgilmour.com

David Jon Gilmour (/ˈɡɪlmɔːr/ GHIL-mor; born 6 March 1946) is an English musician, singer, and songwriter best known for being the primary guitarist and co-lead vocalist of the English rock band Pink Floyd. He joined in 1967, shortly before the departure of founding member Syd Barrett. By the early 1980s, Pink Floyd had become one of the highest-selling and most acclaimed acts in music history. Following the departure of Roger Waters in 1985, Pink Floyd continued under Gilmour's leadership and released the studio albums A Momentary Lapse of Reason (1987), The Division Bell (1994) and The Endless River (2014).

Gilmour has released five solo studio albums: David Gilmour (1978), About Face (1984), On an Island (2006), Rattle That Lock (2015) and Luck and Strange (2024). He has achieved three number-one solo albums on the UK Albums Chart, and six with Pink Floyd. He produced two albums by the Dream Academy, and is credited for bringing the singer-songwriter Kate Bush to public attention, paying for her early recordings and helping her find a record contract.

As a member of Pink Floyd, Gilmour was inducted into the US Rock and Roll Hall of Fame in 1996, and the UK Music Hall of Fame in 2005. In 2003, Gilmour was made a Commander of the Order of the British Empire (CBE). He received the award for Outstanding Contribution at the 2008 Q Awards. In 2023, Rolling Stone named him the 28th-greatest guitarist of all time.

Gilmour has taken part in projects related to issues including animal rights, environmentalism, homelessness, poverty, and human rights. He has married twice and is the father of eight children. His wife, the novelist Polly Samson, has contributed lyrics to many of his songs.

== Early life and education ==
David Jon Gilmour was born on 6 March 1946 in Cambridge, England. He has three siblings: Peter, Mark and Catharine. His father, Douglas Gilmour, was a senior lecturer in zoology at the University of Cambridge, and his mother, Sylvia (née Wilson), was a trained teacher who later worked as a film editor for the BBC. At the time of Gilmour's birth, the family lived in Trumpington, Cambridgeshire; after several relocations they moved to nearby Grantchester.

Gilmour's parents encouraged him to pursue his interest in music, and in 1954 he bought his first single, Bill Haley's "Rock Around the Clock". His enthusiasm was stirred by Elvis Presley's "Heartbreak Hotel" (released January 1956), and "Bye Bye Love" (1957) by the Everly Brothers piqued his interest in the guitar. Gilmour borrowed a guitar from a neighbour, but never gave it back. Soon afterwards, he started teaching himself to play using a book and record set by Pete Seeger. At age 11, Gilmour began attending the Perse School on Hills Road, Cambridge, which he did not enjoy. There, he met two future members of Pink Floyd: Syd Barrett and Roger Waters, both of whom attended Cambridgeshire High School for Boys on the same road.

In 1962, Gilmour began studying A-Level modern languages at the Cambridgeshire College of Arts and Technology. Despite not finishing the course, he eventually learned to speak fluent French. Barrett was also a student at the college, and the two spent their lunchtimes together practising guitar. Later that year, Gilmour joined the blues rock band Jokers Wild. They recorded a one-sided album and a single at Regent Sound Studio, in Denmark Street, west London, but only 50 copies of each were made.

At age 19, Gilmour hitchhiked to Saint-Tropez, France. Barrett and his friends drove there and met him before they were arrested for busking. Gilmour and Barrett camped outside Paris for a week and visited the Louvre. During this period, Gilmour worked as the driver and assistant for the fashion designer Ossie Clark. Gilmour travelled to France again in mid-1967 with Rick Wills and Willie Wilson, formerly of Jokers Wild. They performed under the name Flowers, then Bullitt, but were not commercially successful. After hearing their covers of chart hits, club owners were reluctant to pay them, and soon after their arrival in Paris, thieves stole their equipment. In France, Gilmour contributed lead vocals to two songs on the soundtrack of the film Two Weeks in September, starring Brigitte Bardot. When he returned with Bullitt to England later that year, they could not afford petrol and had to push their bus off the ferry onto the landing.

== Career ==
=== Pink Floyd ===
In 1967, Pink Floyd, composed of Gilmour's Cambridge schoolmates Barrett and Waters with Nick Mason and Richard Wright, released their debut studio album, The Piper at the Gates of Dawn. That May, Gilmour briefly returned to London in search of new equipment. During his stay, he watched Pink Floyd record "See Emily Play" and was shocked to find that Barrett, who was suffering mental health problems, did not seem to recognise him.

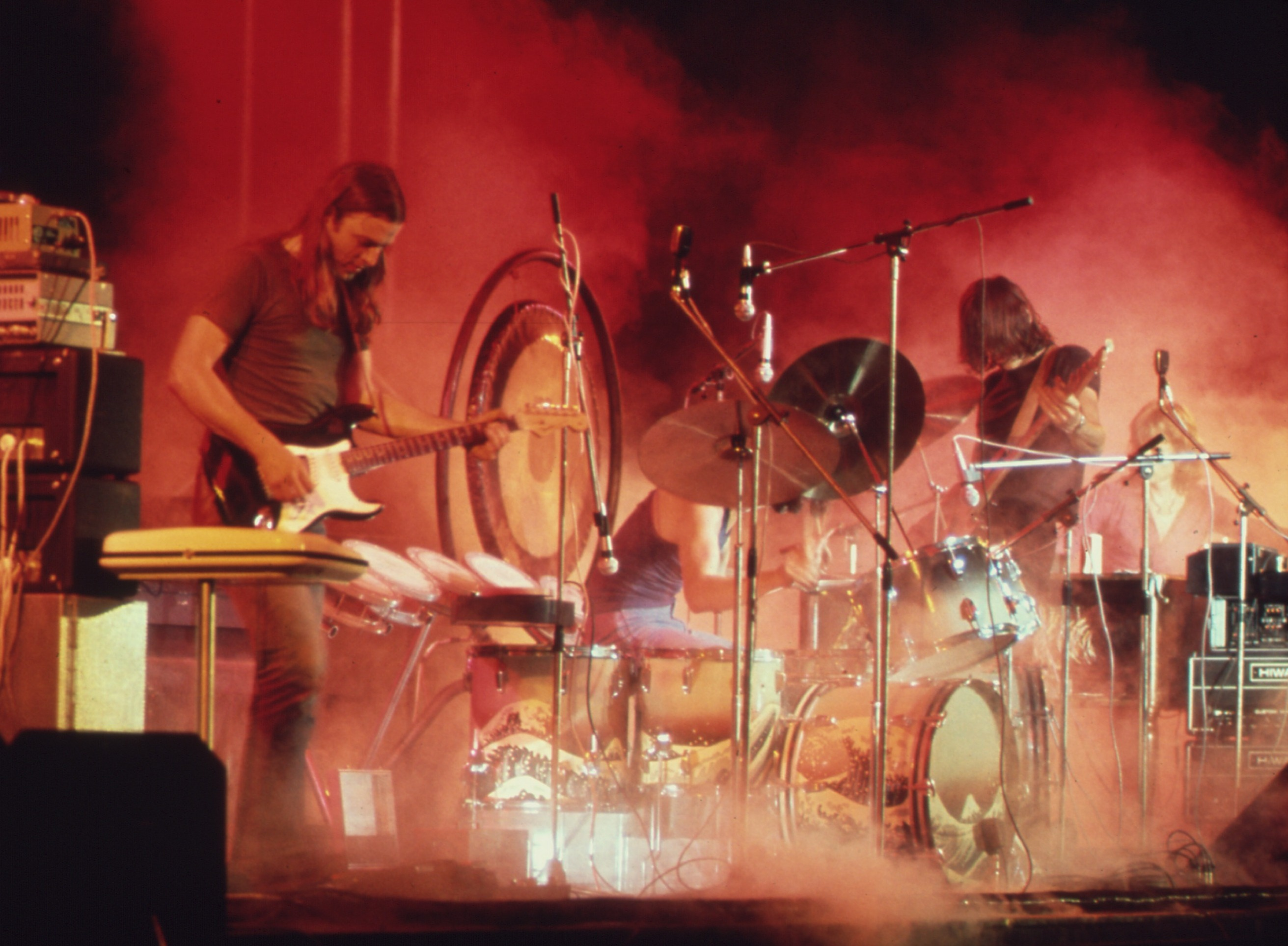
Gilmour (left) performing with Pink Floyd in 1973

In December 1967, after Gilmour had returned to England, he accepted an invitation to join Pink Floyd to cover for the increasingly erratic Barrett. They initially intended to continue with Barrett as a non-performing songwriter. One of the band's business partners, Peter Jenner, said the plan was to have Gilmour "cover for Barrett's eccentricities". By March 1968, working with Barrett had become too difficult and he agreed to leave the band. Mason later said: "After Syd, Dave was the difference between light and dark. He was absolutely into form and shape and he introduced that into the wilder numbers we'd created. We became far less difficult to enjoy, I think." In 1970, Gilmour attended the Isle of Wight Festival and assisted in a live mix of a Jimi Hendrix performance.

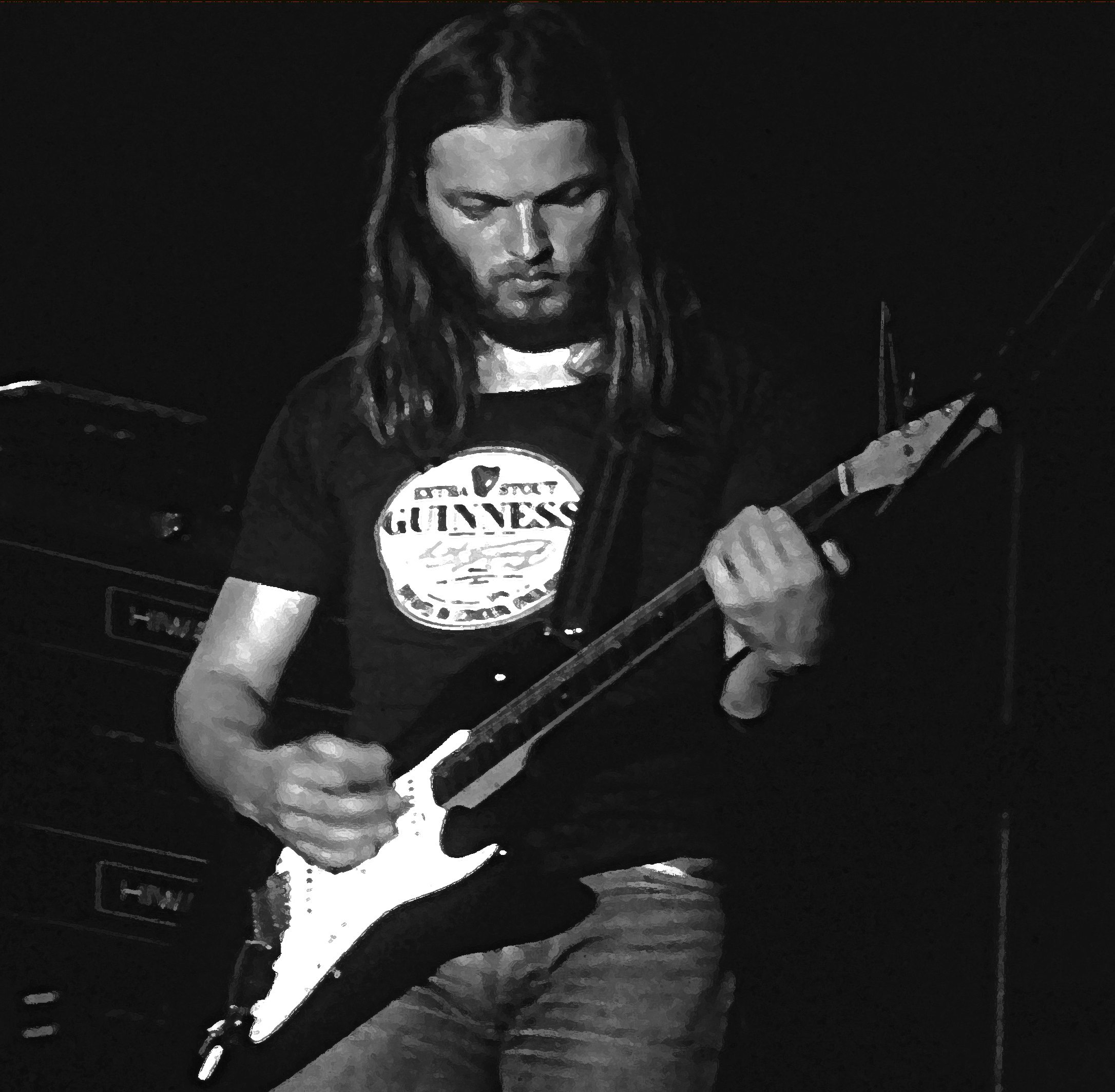
Gilmour performing with Pink Floyd in the mid-1970s

In the 1970s, Gilmour received a copy of a demo tape by the teenage songwriter Kate Bush from Ricky Hopper, a mutual friend of both families. Impressed, Gilmour paid for Bush, then 16, to record three professional demo tracks to present to record labels. The tape was produced by Gilmour's friend Andrew Powell, who went on to produce Bush's first two studio albums, and the sound engineer Geoff Emerick. Gilmour arranged for EMI executive Terry Slater to hear the tape, and Slater signed her. Gilmour is credited as the executive producer on two tracks on Bush's debut studio album, The Kick Inside (1978), including her second single "The Man with the Child in His Eyes". He performed backing vocals on "Pull Out the Pin" on her fourth studio album, The Dreaming (1982), and played guitar on "Love and Anger" and "Rocket's Tail" on her sixth, The Sensual World (1989). In 1975, Gilmour played on Roy Harper's album HQ (1975).

=== First solo work ===
By the late 1970s, Gilmour had begun to think that his musical talents were being underused by Pink Floyd. In 1978, he released his first solo album, David Gilmour, which showcased his guitar playing and songwriting. Music written during the finishing stages of the album, but too late to be used, became "Comfortably Numb" on the Pink Floyd album The Wall (1979).

The relationship between Gilmour and Waters deteriorated during the making of the Wall film and the album The Final Cut (1983). This negative atmosphere led Gilmour to produce his second solo studio album, About Face (1984), which he used to express his feelings about a range of topics, from his relationship with Waters to the murder of John Lennon. Gilmour toured Europe and the US, supported by the Television Personalities, who were dropped after the singer, Dan Treacy, revealed Barrett's address on stage. Mason also made a guest appearance on the UK leg of the tour, which despite some cancellations eventually turned a profit. When he returned from touring, Gilmour played guitar with a range of artists and produced the Dream Academy, including their US top-ten hit "Life in a Northern Town" (1986).

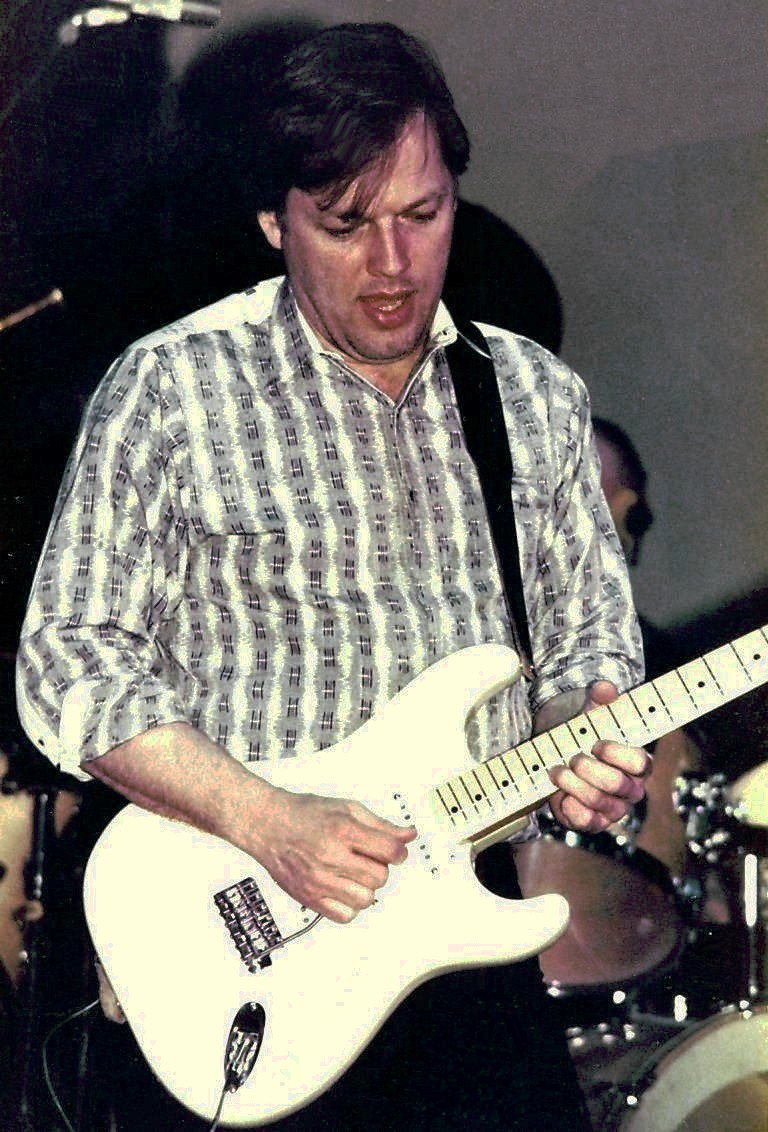
Gilmour in 1984

Gilmour co-wrote five songs on Roy Harper's album The Unknown Soldier (1980), including "Short and Sweet", which was first recorded for Gilmour's first solo album. In April 1984, Harper made a surprise guest appearance at Gilmour's Hammersmith Odeon gig to sing "Short and Sweet". This was included in Gilmour's Live 1984 concert film. Harper also provided backing vocals on Gilmour's second solo studio album About Face (1984).

In 1985, Gilmour played on Bryan Ferry's sixth solo album, Boys and Girls, and on the song "Is Your Love Strong Enough" for the US release of the Ridley Scott film Legend (1985). The music video for "Is Your Love Strong Enough" incorporated Ferry and Gilmour into footage from the film. In July that year, Gilmour played with Ferry at the Live Aid concert at Wembley Stadium in London. He contributed to Pete Townshend's 1985 album White City: A Novel, including the single "Give Blood", and the 1985 Grace Jones album Slave to the Rhythm. Gilmour also played guitar on Paul McCartney's 1984 hit single No More Lonely Nights, on the title track of Supertramp's 1985 album Brother Where You Bound and on three tracks of the 1986 album Persona by the classical guitarist Liona Boyd.

=== Leading Pink Floyd ===
In 1985, Waters declared that Pink Floyd were "a spent force creatively" and attempted to dissolve the band. Gilmour and Mason announced that they intended to continue without him. Waters resigned in 1987, leaving Gilmour as the band leader. In 1986, Gilmour purchased the houseboat Astoria, moored it on the River Thames near Hampton Court, London, and converted it into a recording studio. He produced the Pink Floyd studio album A Momentary Lapse of Reason in 1987, with contributions from Mason and Wright. Gilmour believed Pink Floyd had become too driven by lyrics under Waters' leadership, and attempted to "restore the balance" of music and lyrics. In March 1987, Gilmour played guitar for Kate Bush's performance of "Running Up That Hill" at the Secret Policeman's Third Ball.

Pink Floyd released their second album under Gilmour's leadership, The Division Bell, in 1994. In December 1999, Gilmour played guitar, alongside Mick Green, Ian Paice, Pete Wingfield, and Chris Hall, for Paul McCartney, at a concert at the Cavern Club, in Liverpool, England. This resulted in the concert film Live at the Cavern Club, directed by Geoff Wonfor.

=== 2000s: Pink Floyd reunion and On an Island ===
In 2001 and 2002, Gilmour performed six acoustic solo concerts in London and Paris, along with a small band and choir, which was documented on the In Concert release. On 24 September 2004, he performed a three-song set at the Strat Pack concert at London's Wembley Arena, marking the 50th anniversary of the Fender Stratocaster guitar.

On 2 July 2005, Pink Floyd reunited with Waters to perform at Live 8. The performance caused a sales increase of Pink Floyd's compilation album Echoes: The Best of Pink Floyd (2001). Gilmour donated his profits to charities that reflect the goals of Live 8, saying: "Though the main objective has been to raise consciousness and put pressure on the G8 leaders, I will not profit from the concert. This is money that should be used to save lives." He called upon all Live 8 artists to donate their extra revenue to Live 8 fundraising. After the concert, Pink Floyd turned down an offer to tour the US for £150 million.

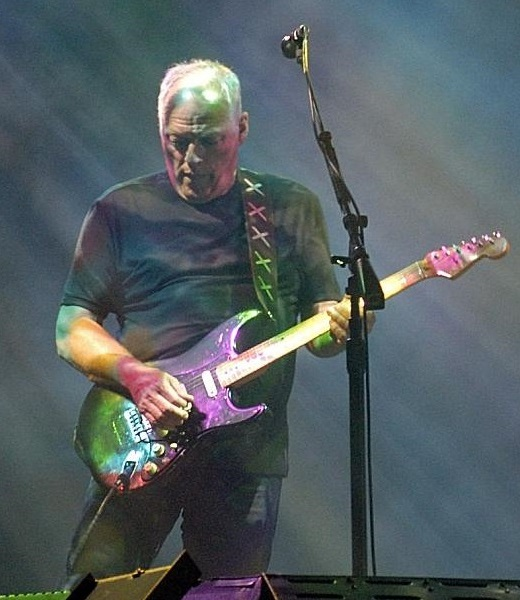
Gilmour performing in Munich, 2006

In 2006, Gilmour said that Pink Floyd would likely never tour or write material again: "I think enough is enough. I am 60 years old. I don't have the will to work as much any more. Pink Floyd was an important part in my life, I have had a wonderful time, but it's over. For me it's much less complicated to work alone."

On 6 March, Gilmour's 60th birthday, he released his third solo album, On an Island. It featured guest musicians including Wright and lyrics by Gilmour's wife, the writer Polly Samson. It debuted at number 1 on the UK Albums Chart and became Gilmour's first solo album to enter the top ten in the US, reaching number six on the Billboard 200. On 21 September 2011 On an Island was certified gold in Canada, with sales of more than 50,000 copies.

Gilmour toured Europe, US and Canada in May 2006, with a band including Wright and the Pink Floyd collaborators Dick Parry, Guy Pratt, and Jon Carin. A DVD, Remember That Night – Live at the Royal Albert Hall, was released on 17 September 2007. For the final show, Gilmour performed with the 38-piece string section of the Polish Baltic Philharmonic orchestra. It was released as Live in Gdańsk (2008).

In December 2006, Gilmour released a tribute to Barrett, who died that year, in the form of his own version of Pink Floyd's first single, "Arnold Layne". Recorded live at London's Royal Albert Hall, it featured versions of the song performed by Wright and David Bowie. It reached number 19 on the UK Singles Chart. In early 2007, Gilmour reconvened his touring band and spent a week recording in a barn in his farm. Some of the recordings were released on his later solo albums.

On 25 May 2009, Gilmour participated in a concert at the Union Chapel in Islington, London, with the Malian musicians Amadou & Mariam. The concert was part of the Hidden Gigs campaign against hidden homelessness, organised by the charity Crisis. On 4 July, Gilmour joined his friend Jeff Beck onstage at the Royal Albert Hall, London. Gilmour and Beck traded solos on "Jerusalem" and closed the show with "Hi Ho Silver Lining". In August 2009, Gilmour released an online single, "Chicago – Change the World", to promote awareness for Gary McKinnon, who was accused of computer hacking. A cover of the Graham Nash song "Chicago", it featured MicKinon, Chrissie Hynde and Bob Geldof and was produced by the longtime Pink Floyd collaborator Chris Thomas.

=== 2010s: Reunion with Waters and Rattle that Lock ===
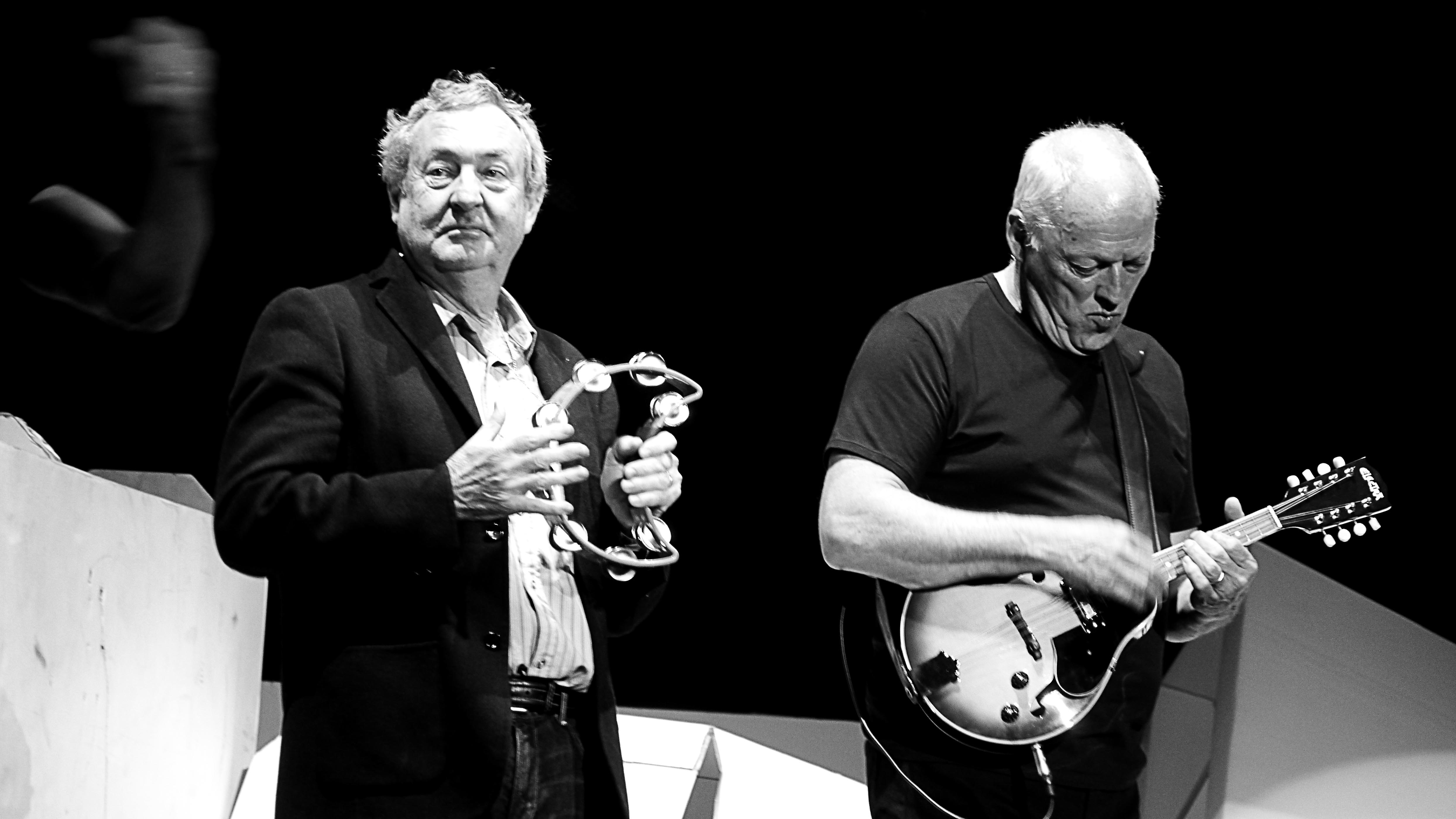
Gilmour with the Pink Floyd drummer Nick Mason (left) at the O2, London, during The Wall Live, 12 May 2011

On 11 July 2010, Gilmour performed with Waters for the charity Hoping Foundation in Oxfordshire. According to onlookers, it seemed that Gilmour and Waters had ended their feud, laughing and joking with their partners. On 12 May 2011, Gilmour made a surprise performing appearance during "Comfortably Numb" with Waters at the O2, London and, with Nick Mason, played with the rest of the band on "Outside the Wall" at the conclusion of the show.

That October, Gilmour released an album with the electronic duo the Orb, Metallic Spheres. Pitchfork wrote that Gilmour "sweeps in and out on guitar, dropping little shiver-inducing melodic runs like it's no big deal. Though his playing here meanders by design, Gilmour sounds neither lazy nor indulgent, more like a virtuoso who doesn't want to actually seem like he's sleepwalking through his performance."

Gilmour and Mason revisited recordings made with Wright during the Division Bell sessions to create a new Pink Floyd album, The Endless River, released on 7 November 2014. Gilmour said it would be Pink Floyd's last album: "I think we have successfully commandeered the best of what there is ... It's a shame, but this is the end." There was no supporting tour, as Gilmour felt it was impossible without Wright. In August 2015, Gilmour reiterated that Pink Floyd were "done" and that to reunite without Wright would be wrong.

In September 2015, Gilmour released his fourth solo album, Rattle That Lock. On 14 November, he was the subject of a BBC Two documentary, David Gilmour: Wider Horizons. On 13 September 2017, Gilmour's live album and film Live at Pompeii, which documents the two shows he performed on 7 and 8 July 2016 at the Amphitheatre of Pompeii, were shown at selected cinemas. The album was released on 29 September 2017 and reached number three on the UK Albums Chart. To celebrate the event, Mayor Ferdinando Uliano made Gilmour an honorary citizen of Pompeii.

Waters and Gilmour continued to quarrel, arguing over subjects including album reissues and the use of the Pink Floyd website and social media channels. Mason, who remains close to both, said in 2018 that Waters did not respect Gilmour, as that Waters "feels that writing is everything, and that guitar playing and the singing are something that, I won't say anyone can do, but that everything should be judged on the writing rather than the playing".

=== 2020s: "Hey, Hey, Rise Up!" and Luck and Strange ===
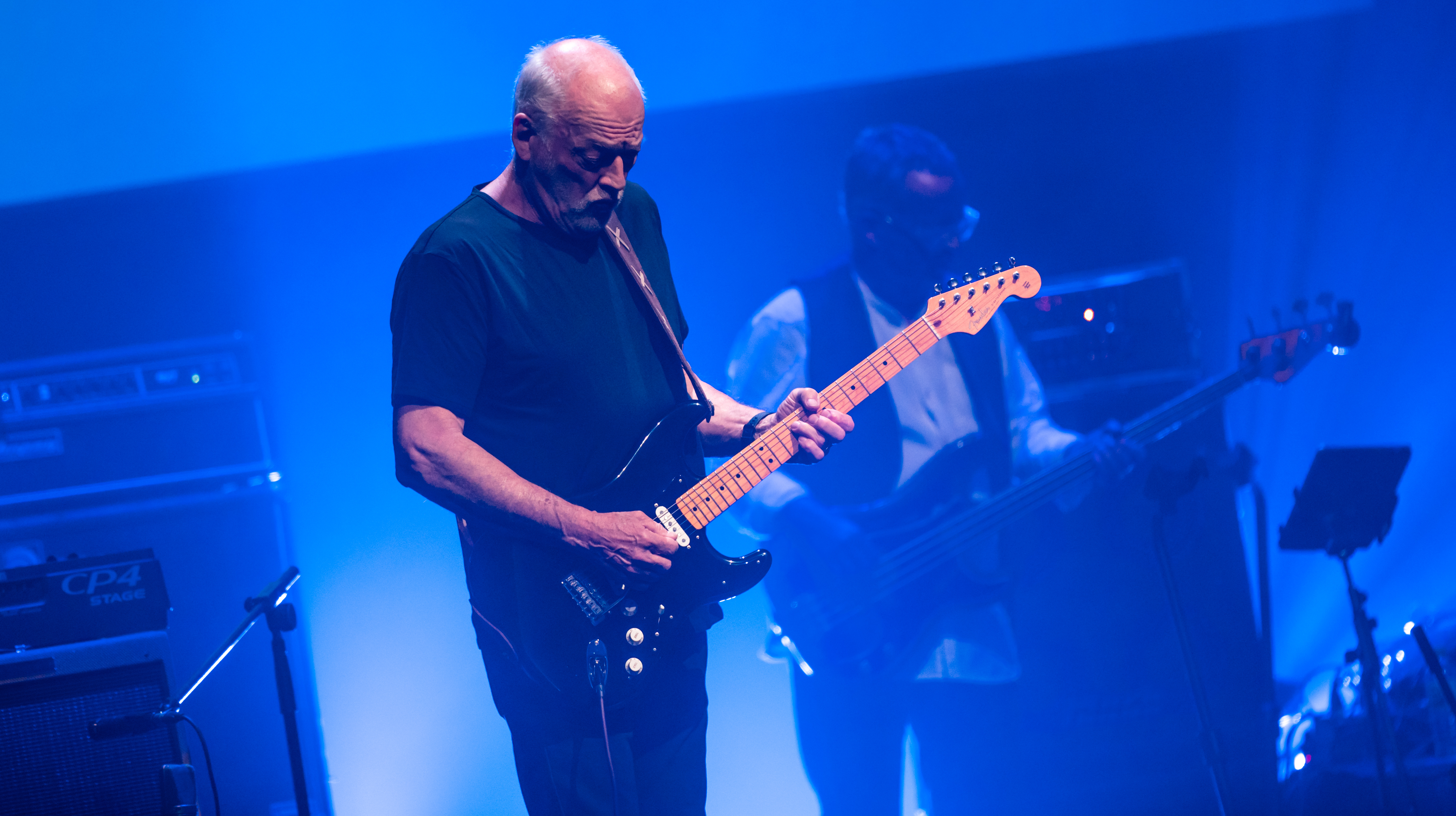
Gilmour performing with Mick Fleetwood in 2020

From April 2020, during COVID lockdown, Gilmour appeared in a series of livestreams with his family, billed as the "Von Trapped Family", performing songs by Barrett and Leonard Cohen. In July, he released "Yes, I Have Ghosts", his first single since 2015. Its lyrics were written by Polly Samson and features his daughter Romany making her recording debut on backing vocals and harp.

In 2021, Rolling Stone noted that Gilmour and Waters had "hit yet another low point in their relationship". In early 2023, Gilmour's wife, Polly Samson, wrote on Twitter that Waters was antisemitic and "a lying, thieving, hypocritical, tax-avoiding, lip-synching, misogynistic, sick-with-envy megalomaniac". Gilmour responded to the tweet on Twitter: "Every word demonstrably true." In April 2022, Gilmour and Mason reformed Pink Floyd to release the song "Hey, Hey, Rise Up!" in protest of the Russian invasion of Ukraine. It samples a performance of the 1914 Ukrainian anthem "Oh, the Red Viburnum in the Meadow" performed by the Ukrainian musician Andriy Khlyvnyuk. Gilmour said the song was a "one-off for Pink Floyd".

In 2024, Gilmour contributed guitar to a new version of Mark Knopfler's "Going Home: Theme of the Local Hero" in aid of the Teenage Cancer Trust. On 6 September, he released his fifth solo album, Luck and Strange. It was recorded over five months in Brighton and London with the producer Charlie Andrew. Gilmour said Andrew challenged him musically as he "has a wonderful lack of knowledge or respect for this past of mine". Samson wrote the majority of the lyrics, which she said reflected themes of mortality and ageing. The album features keyboards recorded by Wright in 2007, lyrics by Gilmour's son Charlie, and harp and vocals by his daughter Romany. Gilmour felt Luck and Strange was his best work since The Dark Side of the Moon. It became Gilmour's third album to reach number one on the UK Albums Chart.

Gilmour contributed guitar to a cover of "Comfortably Numb" by the American metal band Body Count, released in September 2024. That month, he began a tour for Luck and Strange, with performances in London, Rome, Los Angeles and New York. He replaced some musicians in his touring band, saying he wanted to use more creative musicians and avoid "sticking quite so slavishly to the original records". He planned to record another album with the same musicians soon after completing the tour. In July 2025, Gilmour received the O2 Silver Clef award, presented by the Radiohead guitarist Jonny Greenwood. A concert film of the Luck and Strange tour, Live at the Circus Maximus, Rome, was released in Imax theatres in September, followed by digital and home media releases in October.

== Artistry ==
Gilmour credits guitarists such as Pete Seeger, Lead Belly, Jeff Beck, Eric Clapton, Jimi Hendrix, Joni Mitchell, John Fahey, Roy Buchanan, and Hank Marvin of the Shadows as influences. Gilmour said, "I copied – don't be afraid to copy – and eventually something that I suppose that I would call my own appeared."

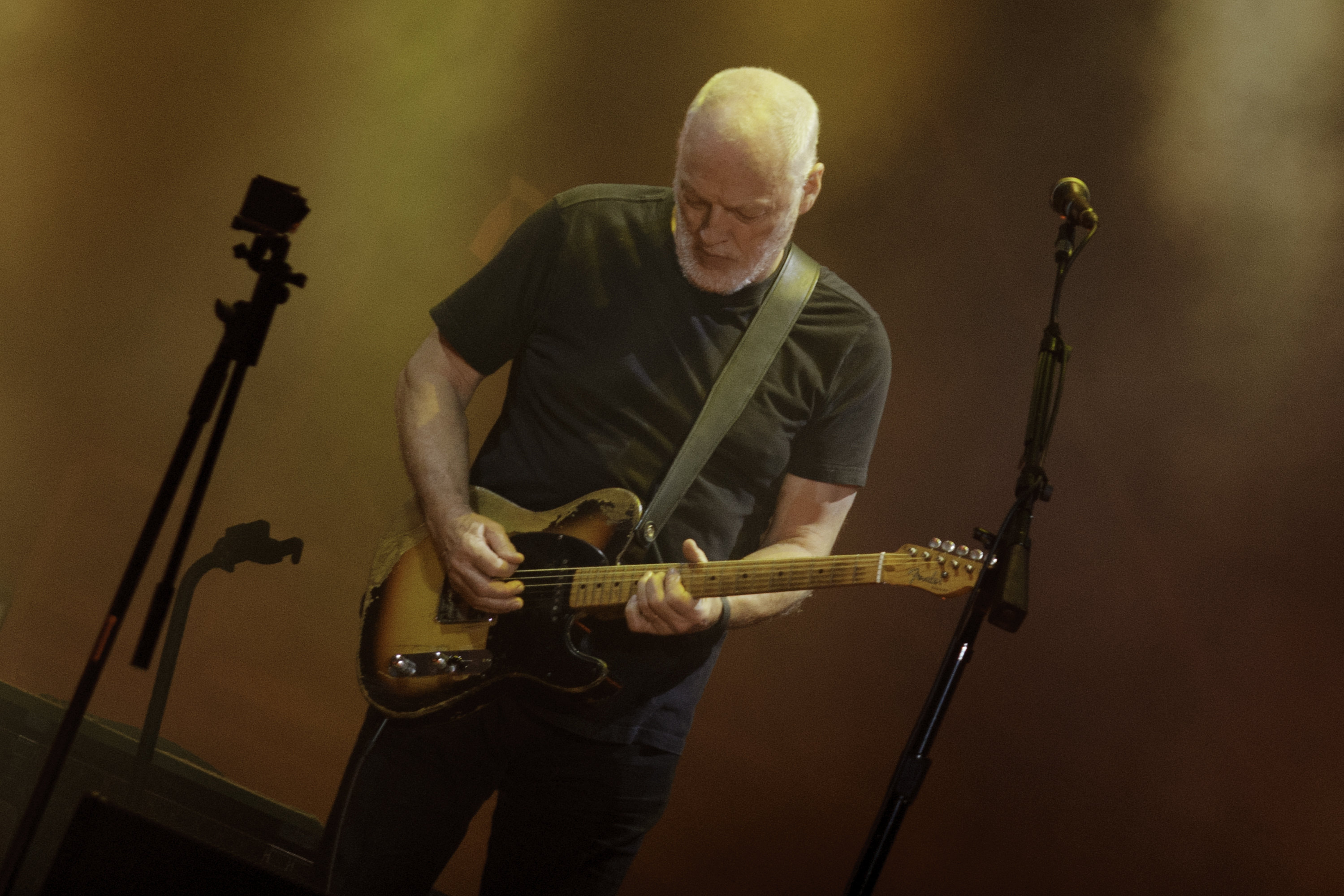
Gilmour performing in Buenos Aires, Argentina, during the Rattle That Lock Tour, 19 December 2015. Gilmour is playing the "Workmate", a well-worn Fender Esquire, with an added neck pick-up.

Gilmour's lead guitar style is characterised by blues-influenced phrasing, expressive note bends, and sustain. The Times wrote in 2025, "In an era of showboating, Gilmour sounded like no one else: his playing was all about tone, texture and a kind of languid grandeur." In 2006, Gilmour said, "[My] fingers make a distinctive sound... [they] aren't very fast, but I think I am instantly recognisable." The Pink Floyd technician Phil Taylor said, "It really is just his fingers, his vibrato, his choice of notes and how he sets his effects ... In reality, no matter how well you duplicate the equipment, you will never be able to duplicate the personality."

The author Mike Cormack wrote that Gilmour's playing from The Dark Side of the Moon onwards "defines the sound of Pink Floyd". He cited Gilmour's third solo in "Dogs" as "perhaps the finest in his entire career, a masterpiece of phrasing, spacing, tone and articulation", and said the second solo in "Comfortably Numb" was "an utter master at work, leaving space, repeating and building on licks to give a sense of structure, not overplaying, building to a shrieking climax, and then fading out while leaving the listener wanting more".

Gilmour also plays bass, keyboards, banjo, lap steel, mandolin, harmonica, drums, and saxophone. Gilmour said he played bass on some Pink Floyd tracks, such as the fretless bass on "Hey You", as he could do it more quickly than Waters; he said that Waters would thank him for "winning him bass-playing polls".

=== Guitars ===
For Gilmour's 21st birthday, in March 1967, his parents gave him his first Fender guitar, a white Telecaster with a white pickguard and a rosewood fretboard. He used this guitar when he joined Pink Floyd in 1968, with one of Barrett's Telecasters as a spare.

==== The Black Strat ====
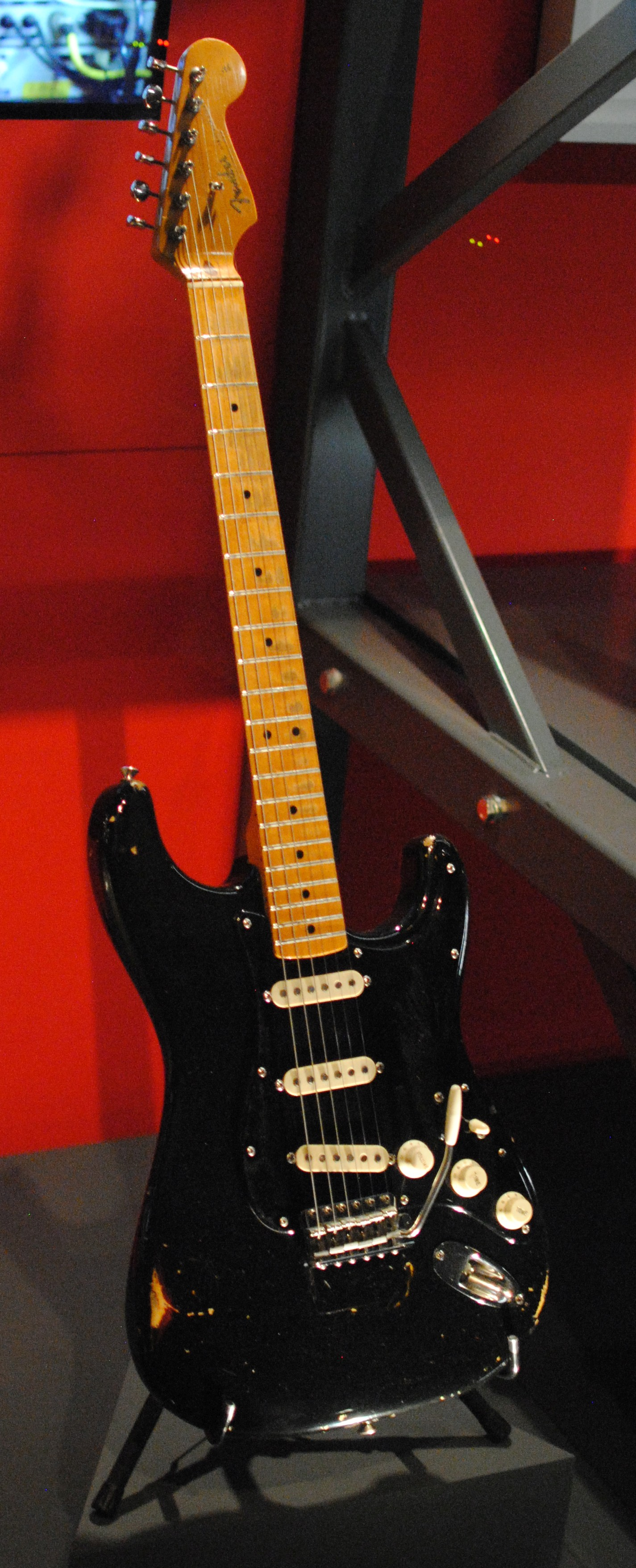
Gilmour's "Black Strat" on display at the Pink Floyd: Their Mortal Remains exhibition.

Gilmour used the Black Strat, a Fender Stratocaster, in most Pink Floyd concerts and for every Pink Floyd studio album recorded between 1970 and 1983. Gilmour bought it at Manny's Music in New York City in 1970, after Pink Floyd's US tour was cancelled due to the theft of their equipment in New Orleans. It originally had a rosewood fretboard and a white pickguard and underwent a number of modifications, finishing with a black pickguard and maple neck. It was auctioned for charity in 2019 for $3.9 million. It sold again in 2026 for US$14,560,000; both sales made it the most expensive guitar ever sold at auction at that time.

==== Fender Black Strat Signature Stratocaster ====
In November 2006, Fender Custom Shop announced two reproductions of Gilmour's Black Strat for release on 22 September 2008. Phil Taylor, Gilmour's guitar technician, supervised this release and has written a book on the history of this guitar. The release date was chosen to coincide with the release of Gilmour's Live in Gdańsk album. Both guitars are based on extensive measurements of the original instrument, each featuring varying degrees of wear. The most expensive is the David Gilmour Relic Stratocaster, which features the closest copy of wear on the original guitar. A pristine copy of the guitar is also made, the David Gilmour NOS Stratocaster.

==== The 0001 Strat ====
The 0001 Strat is a Fender Stratocaster with a white body, maple neck, three-way pick up selector and a gold anodised pickguard and gold-plated hardware. Seymour Duncan said it was a "partscaster", as he assembled it from two different guitars. The model was used as a spare and for slide guitar in subsequent years. In 2019, the 0001 Strat was sold at auction for $1,815,000, setting a new world auction record for a Stratocaster. Gilmour also owns an early 1954 Stratocaster, believed to predate Fender's commercial release of the model.

==== Other electric guitars ====
Along with the Fender models, Gilmour has also used a Gibson Les Paul goldtop model with P-90 pick-ups during recording sessions for The Wall and A Momentary Lapse of Reason. Gilmour also plays a Gretsch Duo-Jet, a Gretsch White Falcon, and a "White Penguin". He played a Bill Lewis 24-fret guitar during the Meddle and Dark Side of the Moon recording sessions. A Steinberger GL model was his main guitar during A Momentary Lapse of Reason recording sessions.

==== Acoustic ====
Gilmour’s acoustic guitars have included a Gibson Chet Atkins classical model, and a Gibson J-200 Celebrity, acquired from John Illsley of Dire Straits. Gilmour used several Ovation models including a Custom Legend 1619-4, and a Custom Legend 1613-4 nylon string guitar, both during the Wall recording sessions. Martin models used include a D-35, purchased in New York in 1971, and a D12-28 12-string.

==== Steel guitar ====
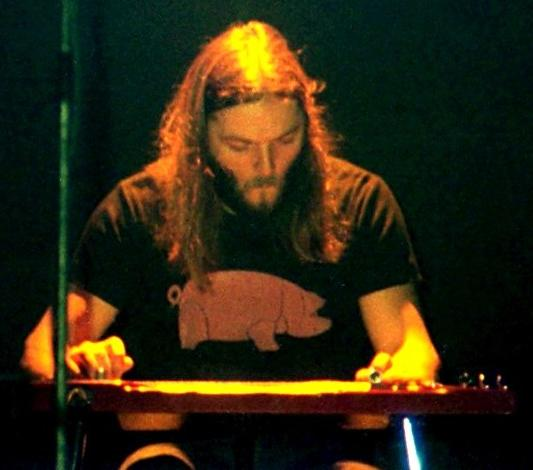
Gilmour playing lap steel guitar, 1977

Gilmour used a pair of Jedson steel guitars and a Fender 1000 pedal steel frequently in the early 1970s. Originally purchased from a pawn shop while Gilmour was in Seattle in 1970, the Jedson was used during recording of "One of These Days" from Meddle and "Breathe" and "The Great Gig in the Sky" from Dark Side of the Moon. Gilmour also owns a Fender Deluxe lap steel, which he used during The Division Bell tour in 1994. Gilmour also owns a Champ lap steel model. Along with the Fender steel models Gilmour has also used: a Gibson EH150, and two Jedson models: one red (1977-tuned D-G-D-G-B-E for "Shine On You Crazy Diamond, Parts 6–9", 1987–2006: Tuned E-B-E-G-B-E for "High Hopes") and one blonde. He also uses a ZB steel model. Gilmour played pedal steel guitar on the album Blue Pine Trees by Unicorn.

==== Signature pick-ups ====
In 2004 EMG, Inc. released the DG20 Signature guitar pick-up kit for the Fender Stratocaster. The set included three active pick-ups, an EXG Guitar Expander for increased treble and bass frequencies, and a SPC presence control to enhance earthiness and mid-range. The system came pre-wired on a custom 11-hole white pearl pickguard with white knobs.

=== Amplifiers and effects ===
By The Dark Side of the Moon, Gilmour's preferred amplifier was a 1973/1974 Hiwatt DR103 with the Normal and Brilliant inputs custom-wired to run in parallel at the same time, as if a Y-cable was being used. He ran his DR103 into a 4x12 WEM Super Starfinder 200 speaker cabinet with Fane Crescendo 12A speakers. (Roger Waters also used this combination during that era of the band.) For The Wall, Gilmour added an Alembic F-2B tube preamp to his Hiwatt rig; the F-2B was paired with a Yamaha RA-200—essentially a solid-state version of a Leslie speaker—that had its internal preamp bypassed. The EL34-powered Hiwatt Custom 50 SA212 combo later became a staple of Gilmour's setup, being used on The Endless River alongside a 1958 tweed Fender Twin and Alessandro Redbone Special. He would use much of this same rig for later releases like Luck and Strange.

Gilmour is regarded as a "trailblazer" in regard to his use of effects pedals. When recording Dark Side, his pedals included a Dallas Arbiter Fuzz Face, Colorsound Power Boost, Univox Uni-Vibe, Binson Echorec II, and EMS Synthi Hi-Fli guitar effect processor. He also used a Leslie rotary speaker until replacing it with the Yamaha RA-200. Other effects added to Gilmour's setup around The Wall included an Electro-Harmonix Big Muff and Electric Mistress, an MXR Phase 90, and several pedals made by Pete Cornish, who also built custom-wired effects units for Gilmour. Later additions to his effects collection include the BK Butler Tube Driver, Origin Effects Cali76 compressor, and Boss CE-2 chorus.

== Legacy and impact ==
According to MusicRadar, Gilmour is "a household name among the classic rock crowd, and for a lot of younger guitar fans he's the only 1970s guitarist that matters. For many he's the missing link between Jimi Hendrix and Eddie Van Halen." The MusicRader writer Billy Saefong wrote that Gilmour "isn't as flashy as Jimi Hendrix or Jimmy Page on the stage, but his guitar work outshines most for emotion."

In 1996, Gilmour was inducted into the Rock and Roll Hall of Fame as a member of Pink Floyd. He has been ranked one of the greatest guitarists of all time by publications including Rolling Stone and The Daily Telegraph. In January 2007, Guitar World readers voted Gilmour's solos for "Comfortably Numb", "Time" and "Money" among the top 100 greatest guitar solos. He was voted the 36th-greatest rock singer by Planet Rock listeners in 2009. Rolling Stone named Gilmour the 14th-greatest guitarist of all time in 2011 and the 28th-greatest guitarist in 2023.

Gilmour was cited by the Marillion guitarist Steve Rothery as one of his three main influences. John Mitchell, the guitarist of the bands It Bites and Arena, also cited Gilmour as an influence. In 2013, Gary Kemp, the guitarist and songwriter of Spandau Ballet and a member of Nick Mason's Saucerful of Secrets, argued that Gilmour's work on The Dark Side of the Moon "must make him the best guitar player in recent history".

== Awards and honours ==
Gilmour was appointed a Commander of the Order of the British Empire (CBE) in the 2003 Birthday Honours "for services to music". The award was presented to him at Buckingham Palace on 7 November that year.

On 22 May 2008, he won the 2008 Ivor Novello Lifetime Contribution Award, recognising his excellence in music writing. Later that year, he was recognised for his outstanding contribution to music by the Q Awards. He dedicated his award to the Pink Floyd keyboardist Richard Wright, who died in September 2008. On 11 November 2009, Gilmour received an honorary doctorate from Anglia Ruskin University.

== Charity work ==
Gilmour has supported charities including Oxfam, the European Union Mental Health and Illness Association, Greenpeace, Amnesty International, the Lung Foundation, Nordoff-Robbins music therapy, Teenage Cancer Trust, and People for the Ethical Treatment of Animals (PETA). In May 2003, Gilmour sold his house in Little Venice to the ninth Earl Spencer and donated the proceeds worth £3.6 million to Crisis to help fund a housing project for the homeless. He has been named a vice-president of the organisation. He donated £25,000 to the Save the Rhino foundation in exchange for Douglas Adams's name suggestion for the album that became The Division Bell.

On 20 June 2019, Gilmour auctioned 120 of his guitars for charity at Christie's in New York, including his Black Strat, his #0001 and early 1954 Stratocasters, and his 1955 Les Paul. The Black Strat sold for $3,975,000, making it the most expensive guitar ever sold at auction. The auction raised $21,490,750, with the proceeds going to the environmentalist charity ClientEarth.

== Personal life ==
On 7 July 1975, Gilmour married Virginia "Ginger" Hasenbein, an American model and artist. The couple have four children. In 1994, Gilmour married the English writer Polly Samson, who has written lyrics for many of his songs, including some on Pink Floyd albums. Gilmour and Samson also have four children. The eldest, Charlie (born 1989) was adopted by Gilmour; his biological father is Samson's previous partner, Heathcote Williams.

Gilmour described himself as left wing. He said his parents were "Proper Manchester Guardian readers. ... Some of their friends went on the Aldermaston Marches. Mine never did to my knowledge, but they were both committed to voting for the Labour Party." He described himself as a socialist, "even if I can't quite stick with party politics". In August 2014, Gilmour was one of 200 public figures to sign a letter to The Guardian expressing their hope that Scotland would vote to remain part of the UK in the Scottish independence referendum. Gilmour endorsed the Labour leader Jeremy Corbyn in the 2017 UK general election. He tweeted: "I'm voting Labour because I believe in social equality." Gilmour is an atheist.

Gilmour is an experienced pilot and aviation enthusiast. Through his company Intrepid Aviation, he amassed a collection of historical aircraft. He later sold the company, which he had started as a hobby, feeling that it was becoming too commercial for him to enjoy.

According to the Sunday Times Rich List 2018, Gilmour's net worth is £115 million. He owns a home near the village of Wisborough Green, Sussex. In 2015, Gilmour and Samson purchased Medina House, a derelict bathhouse in Brighton and Hove, and had it demolished and rebuilt. Gilmour also spends time at his recording studio houseboat Astoria near Hampton Court Palace.

== Discography ==
Studio albums

- David Gilmour (1978)
- About Face (1984)
- On an Island (2006)
- Rattle That Lock (2015)
- Luck and Strange (2024)

== Tours ==
- About Face Tour (1984)
- On an Island Tour (2006)
- Rattle That Lock Tour (2015–2016)
- Luck and Strange (2024)

== See also ==
- List of atheists in music

== Sources ==
- Blake, Mark (2008). Comfortably Numb: The Inside Story of Pink Floyd (1st US paperback ed.). Da Capo Press. ISBN 978-0-306-81752-6.
- Cormack, Mike (2024). Everything Under The Sun: The Complete Guide To Pink Floyd. The History Press. ISBN 978-1803995359.
- Fitch, Vernon (2005). The Pink Floyd Encyclopedia (Third ed.). Collector's Guide Publishing, Inc. ISBN 978-1-894959-24-7.
- Fitch, Vernon; Mahon, Richard (2006). Comfortably Numb: A History of "The Wall" – Pink Floyd 1978–1981 (1st ed.). PFA Publishing, Inc. ISBN 978-0-9777366-0-7.
- Mabbett, Andy (2010). Pink Floyd – The Music and the Mystery (1st UK paperback ed.). Omnibus Press. ISBN 978-1-84938-370-7.
- Manning, Toby (2006). The Rough Guide to Pink Floyd (1st US paperback ed.). Rough Guides Ltd. ISBN 978-1-84353-575-1. Archived from the original on 17 April 2023.
- Mason, Nick (2005). Inside Out: A Personal History of Pink Floyd (1st US paperback ed.). Chronicle Books. ISBN 978-0-8118-4824-4.
- Povey, Glen (2008). Echoes: The Complete History of Pink Floyd (2nd UK paperback ed.). 3C Publishing Ltd. ISBN 978-0-9554624-1-2. Archived from the original on 13 January 2023.
- Povey, Glen; Russell, Ian (1997). Pink Floyd: In the Flesh: The Complete Performance History (1st US paperback ed.). St. Martin's Press. ISBN 978-0-9554624-0-5. Archived from the original on 17 April 2023.
- Schaffner, Nicholas (1991). Saucerful of Secrets: the Pink Floyd Odyssey (1st US paperback ed.). Dell Publishing. ISBN 978-0-385-30684-3.
- Wenner, Jann, ed. (8 December 2011). "Rolling Stone: The 100 Greatest Guitarists of All Time". Rolling Stone (1145).
