= Grammy Award for Best Traditional Blues Album =

Music award

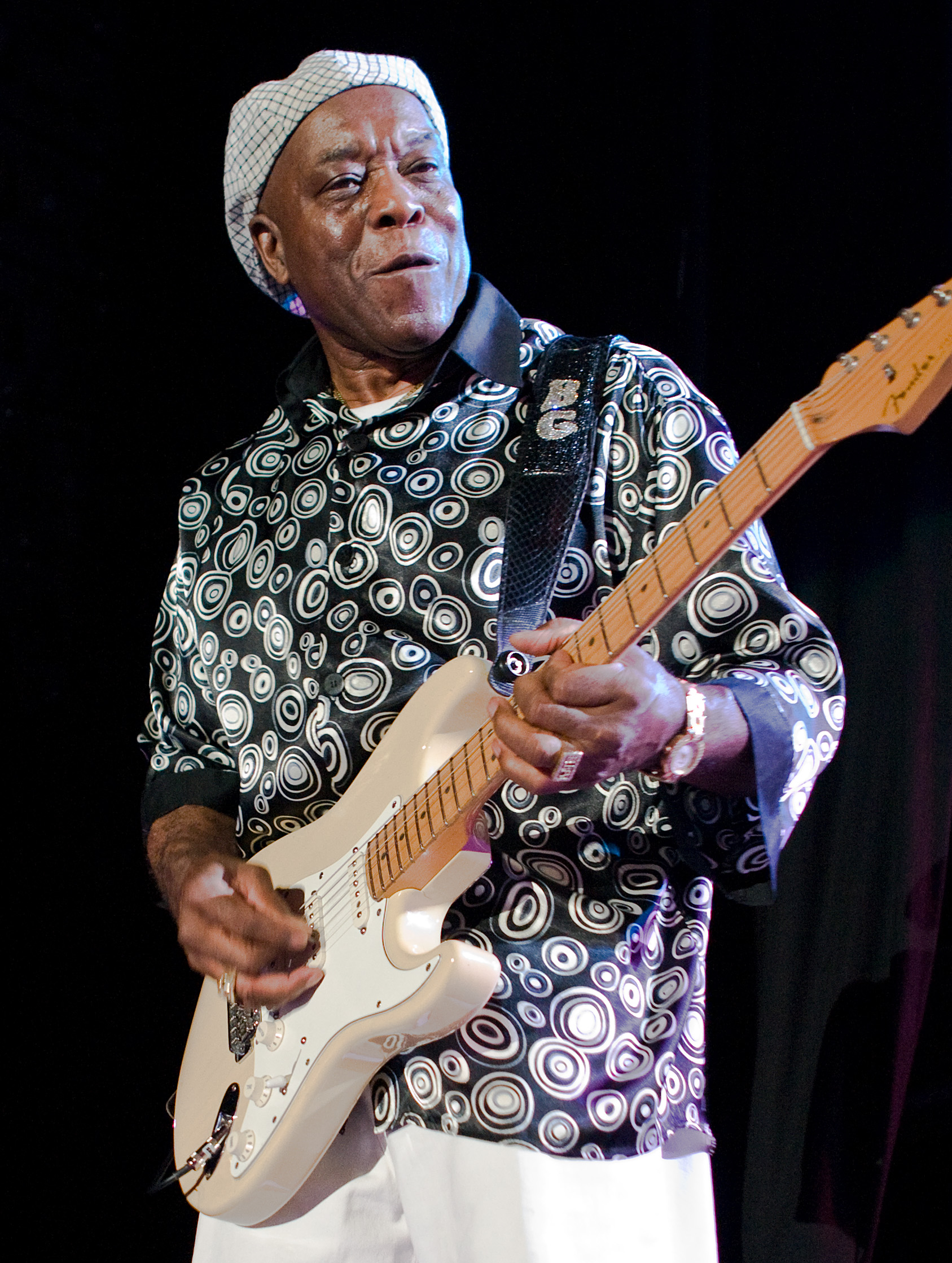
- Ain't Done with the Blues by Buddy Guy is the most recent recipient
- Awarded for: quality traditional blues albums
- Country: United States
- Presented by: National Academy of Recording Arts and Sciences
- First award: 1983
- Currently held by: Buddy Guy – Ain't Done with the Blues (2026)
- Website: Grammy.com

The Grammy Award for Best Traditional Blues Album was awarded from 1983 to 2011 and from 2017 onwards. Until 1992 the award was known as Best Traditional Blues Performance and was twice awarded to individual tracks rather than albums.

The award was discontinued after the 2011 Grammy season in a major overhaul of Grammy categories. From 2012 onwards, the category was merged with the Best Contemporary Blues Album category to form the new Best Blues Album category. However, in 2016 the Grammy organisation decided to revert the situation back to the pre-2012 era, with two separate categories for traditional and contemporary blues recordings respectively.

Years reflect the year in which the Grammy Awards were handed out, for music released in the previous year. B.B. King holds the record of most wins in the category with ten.

== Recipients ==
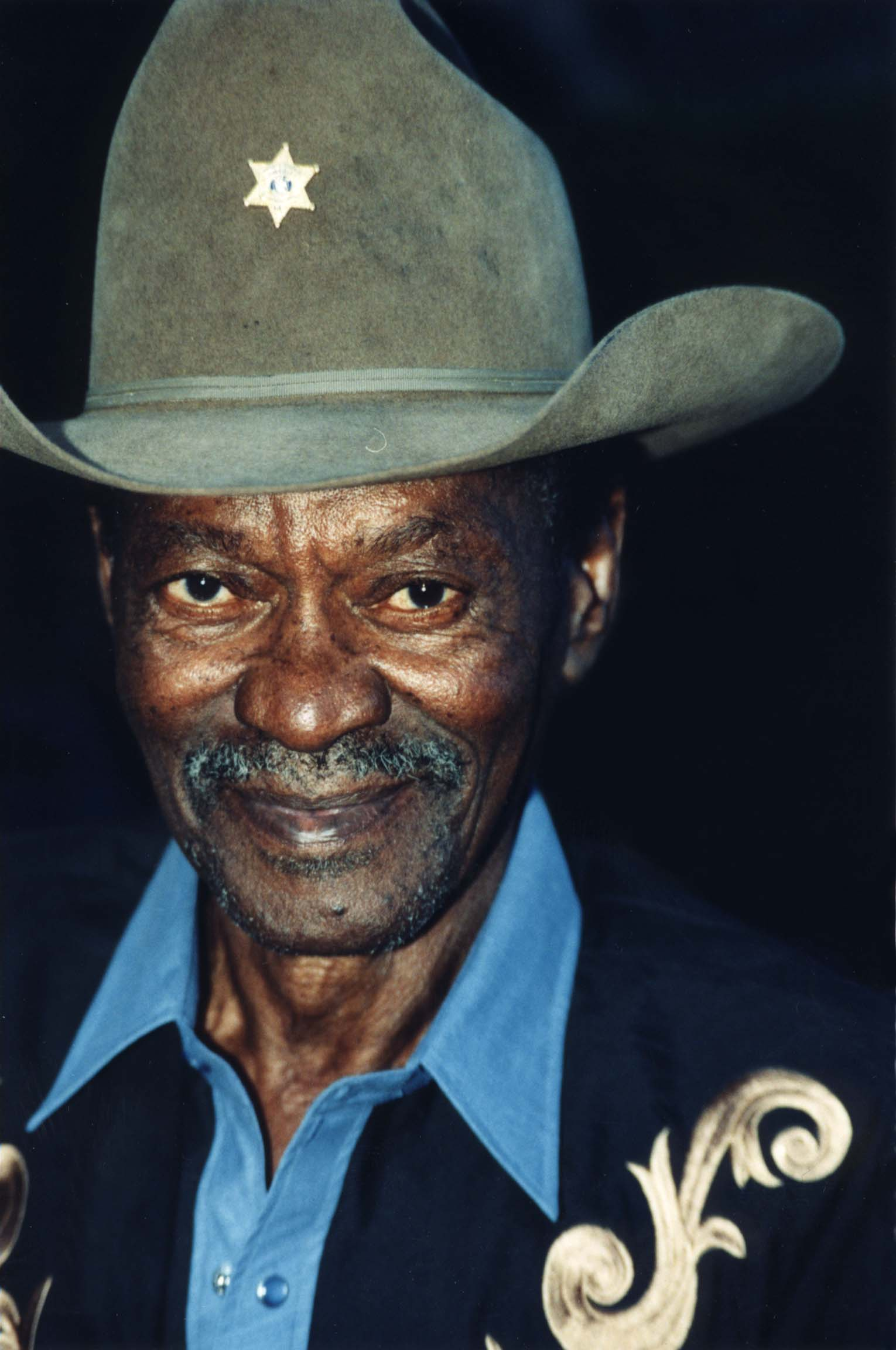
Clarence "Gatemouth" Brown was the first recipient of the award.

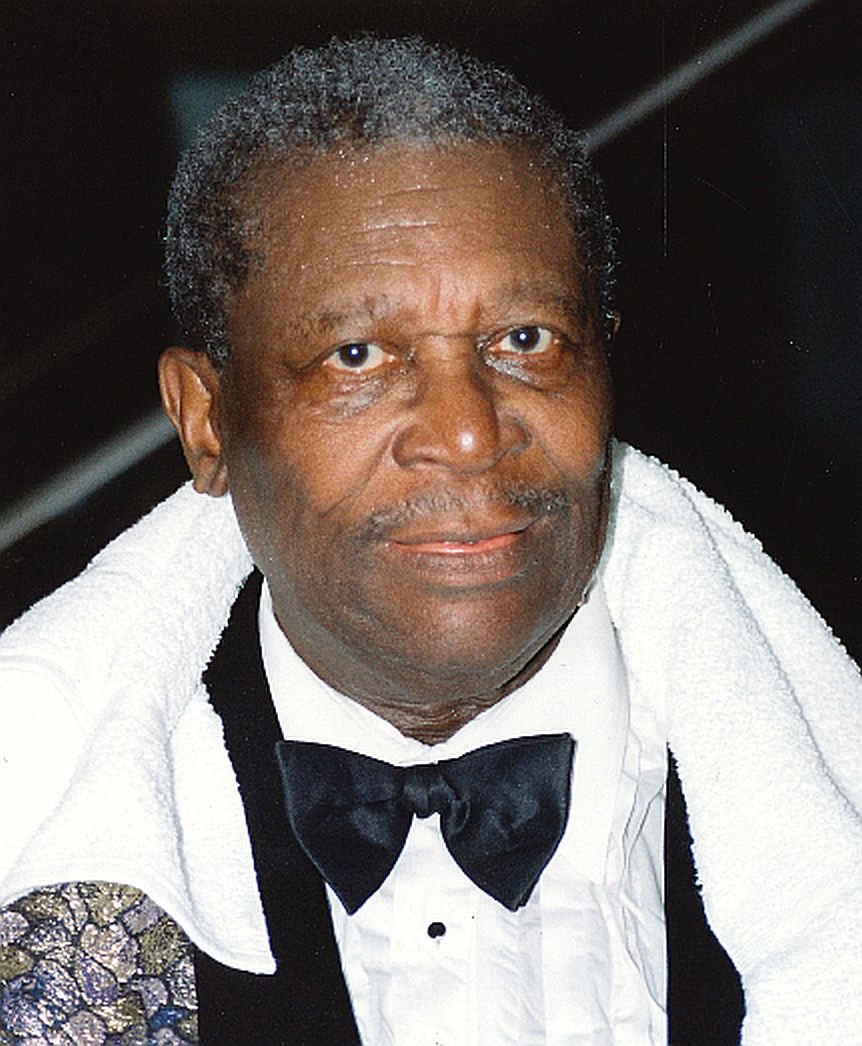
Ten-time winner B.B. King.

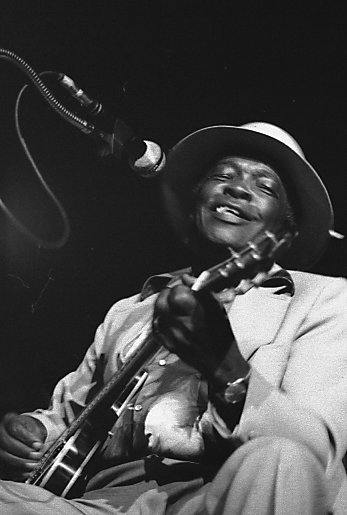
Three-time winner John Lee Hooker.

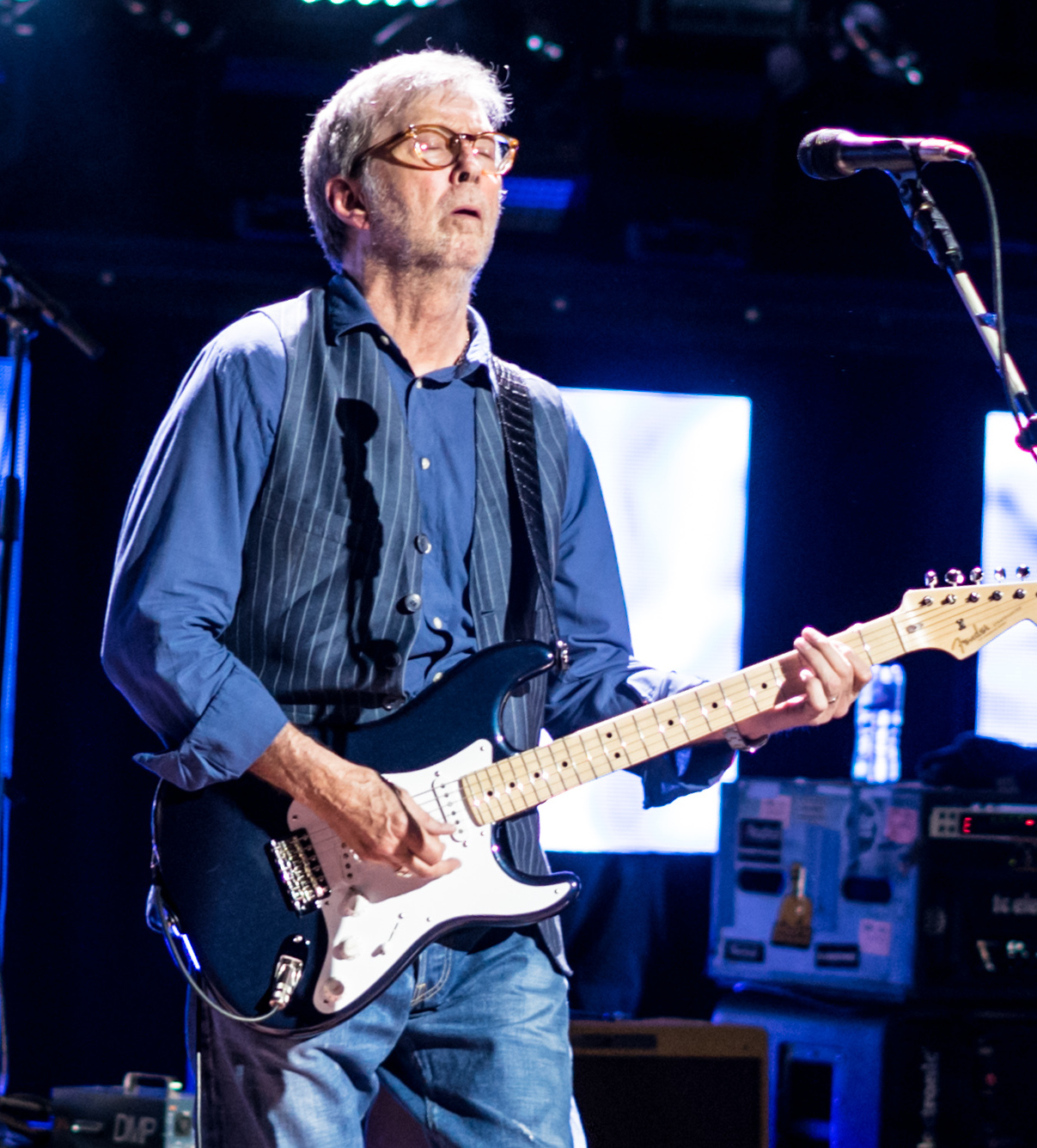
Two-time winner Eric Clapton.

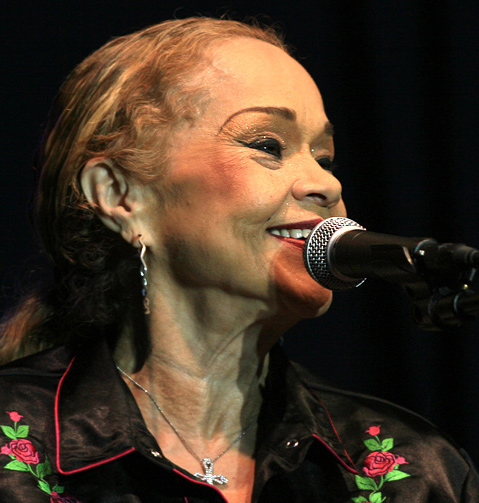
2005 winner Etta James.

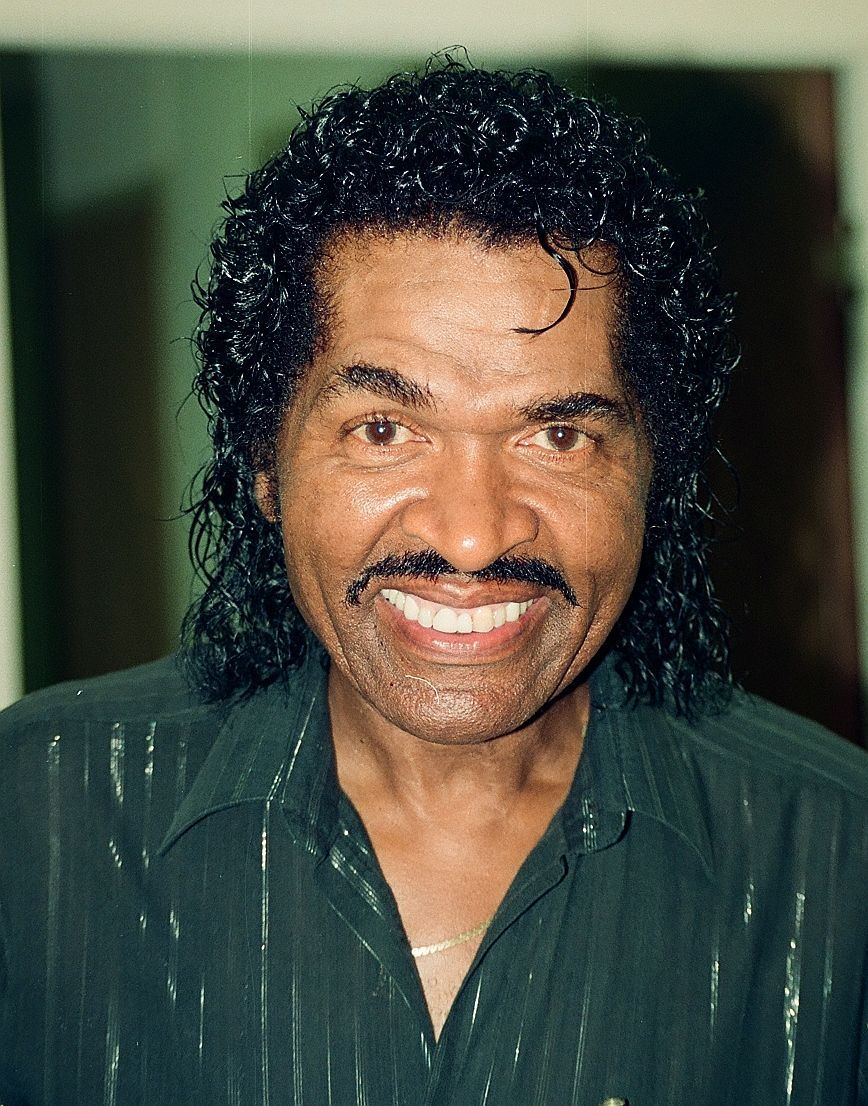
Three-time winner Bobby Rush.

Year^{[I]}	Performing artist(s)	Work	Nominees	Ref.
1983	Clarence "Gatemouth" Brown	Alright Again	Johnny Otis – The New Johnny Otis Show; Hound Dog Taylor & the HouseRockers – Genuine Houserocking Music; Eddie "Cleanhead" Vinson & Roomful of Blues – "He Was a Friend of Mine"; Sippie Wallace – Sippie	
1984	B.B. King	Blues 'N' Jazz	Clarence "Gatemouth" Brown – One More Mile; Albert King – San Francisco '83; Big Joe Turner & Roomful of Blues – Blues Train; Stevie Ray Vaughan & Double Trouble – Texas Flood	
1985	John P. Hammond, Stevie Ray Vaughan & Double Trouble, Sugar Blue, Koko Taylor & the Blues Machine, Luther "Guitar Junior" Johnson & J.B. Hutto & the New Hawks	Blues Explosion	Bobby Bland – You've Got Me Loving You; Albert King – I'm in a Phone Booth, Baby; Big Joe Turner – Kansas City Here I Come; Johnny Winter – Guitar Slinger	
1986	B.B. King	"My Guitar Sings the Blues"	Bobby Bland – Members Only; Roy Buchanan – When a Guitar Plays the Blues; Koko Taylor – Queen of the Blues; Big Joe Turner & Jimmy Witherspoon – Patcha, Patcha, All Night Long; Big Joe Turner with Knocky Parker & His Houserockers – Big Joe Turner with Knocky Parker & His Houserockers; Johnny Winter – Serious Business	
1987	Albert Collins, Robert Cray & Johnny Copeland	Showdown!	Clarence "Gatemouth" Brown – Pressure Cooker; James Cotton – Live from Chicago: Mr. Superharp Himself!; Willie Dixon – Live! Backstage Access; John Lee Hooker – Jealous	
1988	Professor Longhair	Houseparty New Orleans Style	Albert Collins – Cold Snap; James Cotton – Take Me Back; Koko Taylor – Live from Chicago: An Audience with the Queen; Eddie "Cleanhead" Vinson – "Old Maid Boogie"	
1989	Willie Dixon	Hidden Charms	Johnny Copeland – Ain't Nothin' But a Party; James Cotton – Live at Antone's Nightclub; Guitar Slim Jr. – Story of My Life; Rockin' Dopsie – Saturday Night Zydeco	
1990	John Lee Hooker & Bonnie Raitt	"I'm in the Mood"	Ruth Brown – "If I Can't Sell It, I'll Keep Sitting on It"; Willie Dixon – Ginger Ale Afternoon; John Lee Hooker – The Healer; Memphis Slim – Memphis Blues: The Paris Sessions	
1991	B.B. King	Live at San Quentin	Clarence "Gatemouth" Brown – Standing My Ground; Ruth Brown & Linda Hopkins – "T'aint Nobody's Bizness If I Do"; John Lee Hooker, Earl Palmer, Tim Drummond, Miles Davis & Roy Rogers – "Coming to Town"; Little Milton – Too Much Pain	
1992	B.B. King	Live at the Apollo	Charles Brown – All My Life; Johnnie Johnson – Johnnie B. Bad; John Lee Hooker – Mr. Lucky; Taj Mahal – Mule Bone	
1993	Dr. John	Goin' Back to New Orleans	Charles Brown – Someone to Love; Clarence "Gatemouth" Brown – No Looking Back; John P. Hammond – Got Love If You Want It; Various Artists – Roots of Rhythm and Blues: A Tribute to the Robert Johnson Era	
1994	B.B. King	Blues Summit	Albert Collins – Collins Mix: The Best Of; John Lee Hooker – Boom Boom; Taj Mahal – Dancing the Blues; Various Artists – The Alligator Records 20th Anniversary Tour	
1995	Eric Clapton	From the Cradle	James Cotton – Living the Blues; John P. Hammond – Trouble No More; Charlie Musselwhite – In My Time; Otis Rush – Ain't Enough Comin' In	
1996	John Lee Hooker	Chill Out	Charles Brown – Charles Brown's Cool Christmas Blues; Lowell Fulson – Them Update Blues; The Last Real Texas Blues Band featuring Doug Sahm – The Last Real Texas Blues Band featuring Doug Sahm; Roomful of Blues – Turn It On! Turn It Up!	
1997	James Cotton	Deep in the Blues	John P. Hammond – Found True Love; The Muddy Waters Tribute Band – You're Gonna Miss Me (When I'm Dead & Gone); Junior Wells with Guest Slide Guitarists – Come on in This House; Jimmy Witherspoon – Live at the Mint	
1998	John Lee Hooker	Don't Look Back	Ruth Brown – R + B = Ruth Brown; Charlie Musselwhite – Rough News; Pinetop Perkins – Born in the Delta; Junior Wells – Live at Buddy Guy's Legends	
1999	Otis Rush	Any Place I'm Going	Henry Gray, Calvin Jones, Sam Lay, Colin Linden & Hubert Sumlin with Special Guests – A Tribute to Howlin' Wolf; John P. Hammond – Long as I Have You; Luther "Guitar Junior" Johnson & The Magic Rockers – Got to Find a Way; Robert Lockwood Jr. – I Got to Find Me a Woman	
2000	B.B. King	Blues on the Bayou	Bobby "Blue" Bland – Memphis Monday Morning; Ruth Brown – A Good Day for the Blues; Odetta – Blues Everywhere I Go; Pinetop Perkins & Hubert Sumlin – Legends	
2001	B.B. King & Eric Clapton	Riding with the King	James Cotton, Billy Branch, Charlie Musselwhite & Sugar Ray Norcia – Superharps; B.B. King – Let the Good Times Roll; Robert Lockwood Jr. – Delta Crossroads; Willie Nelson – Milk Cow Blues	
2002	Jimmie Vaughan	Do You Get the Blues?	Maria Muldaur & Various Artists – Richland Woman Blues; Ike Turner & The Kings of Rhythm – Here and Now; James Blood Ulmer – Memphis Blood: The Sun Sessions; Various Artists – Hellhound on My Trail: The Songs of Robert Johnson	
2003	B.B. King	A Christmas Celebration of Hope	R. L. Burnside – Burnside on Burnside; James Cotton Blues Band – 35th Anniversary Jam of the James Cotton Blues Band; Alvin Youngblood Hart – Down in the Alley; Various Artists – Preachin' the Blues: The Music of Mississippi Fred McDowell	
2004	Buddy Guy	Blues Singer	Eddy "The Chief" Clearwater featuring Los Straitjackets – Rock 'n' Roll City; Jay McShann – Goin' to Kansas City; Roomful of Blues – That’s Right!; Kim Wilson – Lookin' for Trouble!	
2005	Etta James	Blues to the Bone	Eric Clapton – Me and Mr. Johnson; James Cotton – Baby, Don't You Tear My Clothes; John Lee Hooker Jr. – Blues with a Vengeance; Pinetop Perkins – Ladies Man	
2006	B.B. King & Friends	B.B. King & Friends: 80	Marcia Ball – Live! Down the Road; John P. Hammond – In Your Arms Again; Maria Muldaur – Sweet Lovin' Ol' Soul; Hubert Sumlin – About Them Shoes	
2007	Ike Turner	Risin' with the Blues	Tab Benoit with Louisiana's LeRoux – Brother to the Blues; Dion – Bronx in Blue; James Hunter – People Gonna Talk; Duke Robillard – Guitar Groove-A-Rama	
2008	Henry James Townsend, Pinetop Perkins, Robert Lockwood Jr. & David "Honeyboy" Edwards	Last of the Great Mississippi Delta Bluesmen: Live in Dallas	Pinetop Perkins – Pinetop Perkins on the 88's – Live in Chicago; Otis Rush – Live... and in Concert from San Francisco; Kenny Wayne Shepherd featuring Various Artists – 10 Days Out: Blues from the Backroads; Koko Taylor – Old School	
2009	B.B. King	One Kind Favor	Elvin Bishop – The Blues Rolls On; Buddy Guy – Skin Deep; John Lee Hooker Jr. – All Odds Against Me; Pinetop Perkins & Friends – Pinetop Perkins & Friends	
2010	Ramblin' Jack Elliott	A Stranger Here	The Mick Fleetwood Band featuring Rick Vito – Blue Again!; John P. Hammond – Rough & Tough; Duke Robillard – Stomp! The Blues Tonight; Various Artists – Chicago Blues: A Living History	
2011	Pinetop Perkins & Willie "Big Eyes" Smith	Joined at the Hip	James Cotton – Giant; Cyndi Lauper – Memphis Blues; Charlie Musselwhite – The Well; Jimmie Vaughan – Plays Blues, Ballads & Favorites	
2017	Bobby Rush	Porcupine Meat	Lurrie Bell – Can't Shake This Feeling; Joe Bonamassa – Live at the Greek Theatre; Luther Dickinson – Blues & Ballads (A Folksinger's Songbook: Volumes I & II); Vasti Jackson – The Soul of Jimmie Rodgers	
2018	The Rolling Stones	Blue & Lonesome	Eric Bibb – Migration Blues; Elvin Bishop's Big Fun Trio – Elvin Bishop's Big Fun Trio; R.L. Boyce – Roll and Tumble; Guy Davis & Fabrizio Poggi – Sonny & Brownie's Last Train	
2019	Buddy Guy	The Blues Is Alive and Well	Elvin Bishop's Big Fun Trio – Something Smells Funky 'Round Here; Cedric Burnside – Benton County Relic; Ben Harper & Charlie Musselwhite – No Mercy In This Land; Maria Muldaur – Don't You Feel My Leg (The Naughty Bawdy Blues of Blue Lu Barker)	
2020	Delbert McClinton & the Self-Made Men + Dana	Tall, Dark and Handsome	Christone "Kingfish" Ingram - Kingfish; Bobby Rush - Sitting on Top of the Blues; Jimmie Vaughan - Baby, Please Come Home; Jontavious Willis - Spectacular Class	
2021	Bobby Rush	Rawer than Raw	Frank Bey - All My Dues Are Paid; Don Bryant - You Make Me Feel; Robert Cray Band - That's What I Heard; Jimmy "Duck" Holmes - Cypress Grove	
2022	Cedric Burnside	I Be Trying	Elvin Bishop & Charlie Musselwhite - 100 Years of Blues; Blues Traveler - Traveler's Blues; Guy Davis - Be Ready When I Call You; Kim Wilson - Take Me Back	
2023	Taj Mahal & Ry Cooder	Get On Board	Gov't Mule – Heavy Load Blues; Buddy Guy – The Blues Don't Lie; John Mayall – The Sun Is Shining Down; Charlie Musselwhite – Mississippi Son	
2024	Bobby Rush	All My Love for You	Eric Bibb - Ridin'; Mr Sipp - The Soul Side of Sipp; Tracy Nelson - Life Don't Miss Nobody; John Primer - Teardrops For Magic Slim Live at Rosa's Lounge	
2025	The Taj Mahal Sextet	Swingin' Live at the Church in Tulsa	Cedric Burnside - Hill Country Love; The Fabulous Thunderbirds - Struck Down; Sue Foley - One Guitar Woman; Little Feat - Sam's Place	
2026	Buddy Guy	Ain't Done With The Blues	Taj Mahal & Keb' Mo' - Room on the Porch; Maria Muldaur - One Hour Mama: The Blues of Victoria Spivey; Charlie Musselwhite - Look Out Highway; Kenny Wayne Shepherd & Bobby Rush - Young Fashioned Ways	
2027	Winner TBA on 7 February 2027		Sean Ardoin & Kreole Rock and Soul ft. Mr. Sipp - Zydeco, Trailrides & Southern Soul; Joe Bonamassa - B.B. King’s Blues Summit 100; Morgan Freeman, Ground Zero Blues Club Band, Chineke! Orchestra, Martin Gellner - Morgan Freeman's Symphonic Blues Experience; GA-20 with Charlie Musselwhite - Blues Now; Lil' Ed & the Blues Imperials - Slideways	

== Sources ==
- Grammy Awards – Past Winners Search As noted in this article: search years are offset by one year.
