= All My Love for You (album) =

Blues album by Bobby Rush

Studio album by Bobby Rush
- Released: August 18, 2023
- Genre: Blues
- Label: Deep Rush
- Producer: Bobby Rush

Bobby Rush chronology
Rawer than Raw (2020)	All My Love for You (2023)

All My Love for You is an album by blues musician Bobby Rush. It was released on August 18, 2023.

All My Love for You won a Grammy Award for Best Traditional Blues Album.

== Critical reception ==
On AllMusic, Stephen Thomas Erlewine said, "... Bobby Rush settles into a comfortable groove on All My Love for You.... This is a bright, largely cheerful affair, filled with punchy rhythms, tart horns, and clean licks. Dialing back his signature raunch a notch, Rush sings with an audible grin throughout the record..."

In Blues Blast Magazine Ken Billett wrote, "These new songs provide insights into a man who loves telling a good story and has fun doing so, while emphasizing the groove – that Bobby Rush funky groove – audiences have adored for more than sixty years.... A true gift for today's blues fans, Rush has earned the right to be called an elder statesman of the genre that is the backbone of modern American music."

In Blues Rock Review, Meghan Roos said, "All My Love for You offers listeners a balance between the raw energy brought on 2020's Rawer than Raw and 2016's funk-infused Porcupine Meat, both of which snagged Rush's two Grammys for Best Traditional Blues Album. Each song benefits from strong rhythms that accent Rush's lyrics. Rush sings like he's deeply engaged with the emotions of the moment..."

== Track listing ==
All songs written by Emmett Ellis Jr.

1. "I'm Free"
2. "Running In and Out"
3. "I Want To"
4. "One Monkey Can Stop a Show"
5. "I Can't Stand It"
6. "TV Mama"
7. "I'll Do Anything for You"
8. "I'm the One"
9. "You're Gonna Need a Man Like Me"
10. "I Got a Proposition for You"

== Personnel ==
Musicians

- Bobby Rush – vocals, harmonica, guitar
- Dexter Allen – guitar, bass
- Joey Robinson – keyboards, drums

Production

- Produced by Bobby Rush
- Engineering: Dexter Allen
- Mixing: Dexter Allen, Joey Robinson
- Mastering: Cefe Flynn
- Photography: Arnie Goodman
- Package design: Jimmy Hole
