= Sitting on Top of the Blues =

Blues album by Bobby Rush

Studio album by Bobby Rush
- Released: August 16, 2019
- Genre: Blues
- Length: 43:55
- Label: Deep Rush

Bobby Rush chronology
Porcupine Meat (2016)	Sitting on Top of the Blues (2019)	Rawer than Raw (2020)

Sitting on Top of the Blues is an album by blues musician Bobby Rush. It was released on August 16, 2019.

Sitting on Top of the Blues debuted at number 37 on the Billboard Independent Albums chart. It was nominated for a Grammy Award for Best Traditional Blues Album.

== Critical reception ==
On AllMusic, Mark Deming said, "The swampy funk that was a major part of Rush's musical personality in his salad days is in short supply on 2019's Sitting on Top of the Blues, but his gift for grafting together deep soul and barroom-ready blues is as strong as ever... The arrangements and production are crisp and straightforward, without much in the way of instrumental showboating but full of taut guitar work and some fine harp blowing from Rush."

In All About Jazz, C. Michael Bailey wrote, "At 85 years old, Rush continues to sing with a virility and panache not afforded many decades younger.... Rush puts it all together on Sitting on Top of the Blues. A lifetime of music is distilled into 11 superbly realized originals that span the gap between the earthiest delta blues to West Coast funk."

In Blues Blast Magazine, Steve Jones said, "This is prototypical Bobby Rush. A powerful and soulful recording, Rush songs like a young man turning in 11 new cuts.... He still knows how to deliver the goods and entertain. If you’re a fan you’ll love this. If you’re somehow new to Bobby Rush then this is a great little primer into his style and work."

== Track listing ==
All songs written by Bobby Rush

1. "Hey Hey Bobby Rush"
2. "Good Stuff"
3. "Get Out of Here (Dog Named Bo)"
4. "You Got the Goods on You"
5. "Sweet Lizzy"
6. "Recipe for Love"
7. "Bobby Rush Shuffle"
8. "Pooky Poo"
9. "Slow Motion"
10. "Shake til You Get Enough"
11. "Bowlegged Woman"

== Personnel ==
- Bobby Rush – vocals, harmonica
- Patrick Hayes – guitar, organ
- Vasti Jackson – guitar, bass, drums
- Paul Sinegal – guitar
- Roddie Romero – guitar
- Lee Allen Zeno – bass
- Tony Hall – bass
- Terrance Higgins – drums
- Doug Belote – drums
- Raymond Weber – drums
- Kieko Komaki – organ
- Alonzo Bowen – saxophones
- Michael Campo – trumpet
- Terrance Taplin – trombone
- Joe Krone – piano
