= The Blues Don't Lie =

Studio album by Buddy Guy
- Released: September 30, 2022
- Genre: Blues
- Length: 63:26
- Label: RCA; Silvertone
- Producer: Tom Hambridge

Buddy Guy chronology
The Blues Is Alive and Well (2018)	The Blues Don't Lie (2022)	Ain't Done with the Blues (2025)

Singles from The Blues Don't Lie
- 1. "Gunsmoke Blues" Released: August 11, 2022; 2. "We Go Back" Released: September 4, 2022; 3. "I Let My Guitar Do the Talking" Released: September 19, 2022

The Blues Don't Lie is the 19th studio album by blues guitarist and singer Buddy Guy. It was released as a CD and as a two-disc LP on September 30, 2022.

The Blues Don't Lie was produced by Tom Hambridge, who also co-wrote many of the songs, and plays drums as well. Mavis Staples, Bobby Rush, Wendy Moten, Elvis Costello, James Taylor, and Jason Isbell are featured vocalists on one track each.

The Blues Don't Lie was nominated for a Grammy award for Best Traditional Blues Album.

== Critical reception ==
In Blues Blast Magazine Steve Jones wrote, "At 86, Buddy is still going at it full force with lots and lots of new music and giving it his all.... For me, this is his best album since 2001's Sweet Tea and it is close to being one of his best; it is a flawless effort. This is a superb album and it is well worth adding to any blues lover's collection."

In Blues Rock Review Jamie Warden said, "[This] latest release, The Blues Don't Lie, undoubtedly proves that Buddy is the World Heavyweight Champion of the blues. He's the real deal. It doesn't get much better than Buddy... from his singing, his guitar playing, to his showmanship on stage. While most artists slow down later in life, he shows no signs of slowing down. As cliché as it sounds, he is truly getting better with age."

In Rock & Blues Muse Ellie Rogers wrote, "In fact, Buddy Guy's The Blues Don't Lie is about as close to perfect a new blues album as you could ever hope to hear. Spanning a plethora of moods, topics and sounds, and with more dexterous and impassioned fretwork than many players half his age could even dream of mustering, it's a real blues masterclass."

In Chicago Blues Guide Marty Gunther said, "Sure, Buddy Guy's 86 years old and recently announced dates for a farewell tour, but fear not! The ageless wonder fires on all cylinders with this sensational CD, a 16-song, 64-minute, star-studded effort that's destined to add even more luster to one of the most successful careers in blues history.... The Blues Don't Lie is 24-carat gold from beginning to end. Run, don't walk to buy this one. It's a true-blue treasure!"

== Track listing ==
1. "I Let My Guitar Do the Talking" (Buddy Guy, Tom Hambridge) – 4:26
2. "Blues Don't Lie" (Hambridge) – 3:54
3. "The World Needs Love" (Guy) – 5:30
4. "We Go Back" featuring Mavis Staples (Richard Fleming, Hambridge) – 4:39
5. "Symptoms of Love" featuring Elvis Costello (Fleming, Hambridge) – 3:37
6. "Follow the Money" featuring James Taylor (Hambridge, Gary Nicholson) – 3:41
7. "Well Enough Alone" (Fleming, Hambridge) – 4:12
8. "What's Wrong with That" featuring Bobby Rush (Fleming, Hambridge) – 5:25
9. "Gunsmoke Blues" featuring Jason Isbell (Fleming, Hambridge) – 3:08
10. "House Party" featuring Wendy Moten (Fleming, Hambridge) – 2:59
11. "Sweet Thing" (Joe Josea, B.B. King) – 3:00
12. "Backdoor Scratchin'" (Hambridge, Nicholson) – 3:54
13. "I've Got a Feeling" (John Lennon, Paul McCartney) – 4:01
14. "Rabbit Blood" (Fleming, Hambridge) – 4:43
15. "Last Call" (Hambridge, Bill Sweeney) – 3:33
16. "King Bee" (James Moore) – 2:44

== Personnel ==
Musicians

- Buddy Guy – lead guitar, vocals
- Rob McNelley – rhythm guitar
- Kevin McKendree – Hammond B3 organ, piano, Wurlitzer electric piano
- Reese Wynans – Hammond B3 organ, piano, Wurlitzer electric piano, Fender Rhodes electric piano
- Michael Rhodes – bass
- Glenn Worf – bass
- Tom Hambridge – drums, percussion, tambourine, backing vocals

Production

- Produced by Tom Hambridge
- Recording: Ducky Carlisle
- Additional recording: Zach Allen, Jonathan Lackey, Dave O'Donnell, Casey Wasner, Steve Weeder
- Mixing: Michael Saint-Leon, Tom Hambridge
- Mastering: Brian Lucey
- Art direction, design: Gavin Taylor
- Photography: Paul Natkin

== Charts ==
Chart performance for The Blues Don't Lie
Chart (2022)	Peak position
Australian Jazz & Blues Albums (ARIA)	1
French Albums (SNEP)	166
German Albums (Offizielle Top 100)	41
Swiss Albums (Schweizer Hitparade)	17
