= All My Love for You =

All My Love for You may refer to:

- All My Love for You (album), by Bobby Rush
- All My Love for You (TV series), a South Korean sitcom
