= Vasti Jackson =

American singer-songwriter

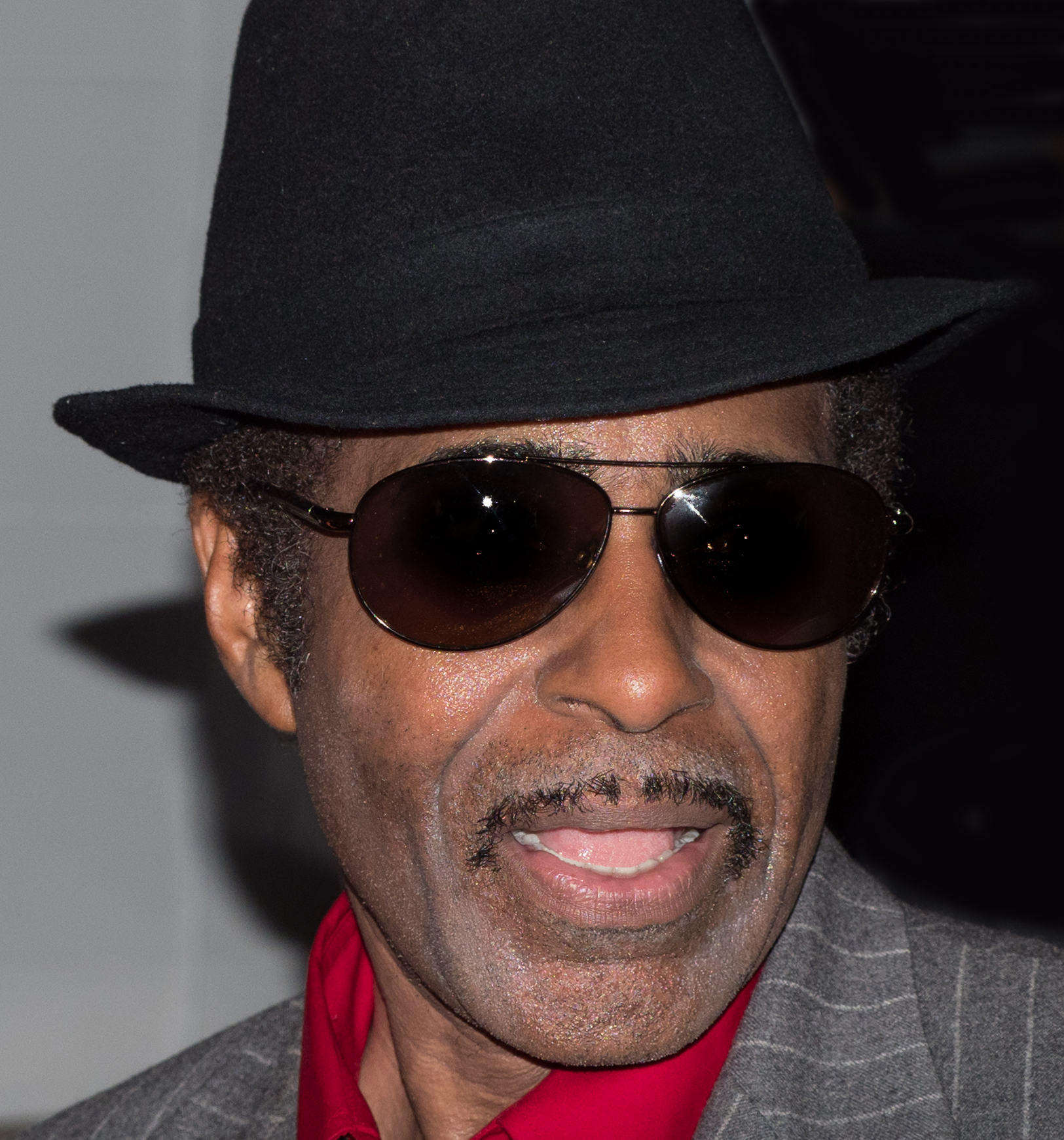
- Vasti Jackson at Nalen, a restaurant in Stockholm, Sweden, October 2017

Background information
- Born: October 20, 1959 (age 66); McComb, Mississippi, U.S.
- Genres: Electric blues, country blues
- Occupations: Guitarist, singer, songwriter, record producer
- Instruments: Guitar, vocals
- Years active: 1980s–present

Vasti Jackson (pronounced Vast-eye) (born October 20, 1959) is an American electric blues guitarist, singer, songwriter, and record producer. He was the musical director and guitarist for Z. Z. Hill, Johnnie Taylor, Denise LaSalle, Little Milton, Bobby Bland and Katie Webster and has worked with gospel artists including the Williams Brothers, the Jackson Southernaires, and Daryl Coley.

Jackson's album, The Soul of Jimmie Rodgers was nominated for the Best Traditional Blues Album category for the 59th Annual Grammy Awards.

== Life and career ==
Jackson was born in McComb, Mississippi west of Hattiesburg and he attended McComb High School. When he was a small boy he lived one block away from the train tracks. Trains fascinated Jackson and when old enough he hopped the train to travel short distances. At the age of twelve the railroad police caught onto his juvenile hobo act although he retains a lifetime love of the railroad. Through his family he came to hear blues music igniting his second love. Jackson studied music at Jackson State University in Jackson, Mississippi. He played in the juke joints around McComb, and his musical learning continued to the extent that by the late 1980s and into the early 1990s, he was employed as a session musician by both Malaco Records and Alligator Records. By 1993, Jackson was serving as the musical director on the television program, Blues Goin' On.

Also in 1993, Jackson's self-penned track, ""Let the Juke Joint Jump" was covered on Koko Taylor's album, Force of Nature. In 1994, Jackson played on B.B. King's Grammy Award winning album, Blues Summit. In 1996, Jackson self-released his debut solo album, Vas-tie Jackson. He turned his hand to record production in 2000, with co-production credits on the Bobby Rush album, Hoochie Man, which was nominated for a Grammy Award the next year. In 2002, Jackson provided backing vocals on "Only a Dream in Rio" on Cassandra Wilson's album, Belly of the Sun. The following year, Jackson was one of the performers in Warming by the Devil's Fire, one of the film documentaries in the series, The Blues, produced by Martin Scorsese. No Borders to the Blues (2003) was his next solo album. Woman Thou Art Loosed was a 2004 American drama film directed by Michael Schultz and written by Stan Foster. Jackson was the music producer for the film's soundtrack.

He returned to production work in 2004, with his work on Henry Butler's Homeland album on Basin Street Records. Jackson also played guitar and was a backing vocalist on the collection. In 2005, Jackson co-wrote and produced the track "Hello", on Morris Mills's album, Love & Coffee. While Jackson's own composition, "Casino in the Cotton Field", appeared in the Lifetime Television Network film, Infidelity (2006). He spent time touring his own work which saw him appear in locations across the globe. In 2010, Jackson released his next studio album, Stimulus Man. The next year, Jackson performed at the New Orleans Jazz & Heritage Festival and played the title role in the play, Robert Johnson The Man, The Myth, The Music! In June 2012, he performed at the Chicago Blues Festival. The same year he was inducted into the Mississippi Musicians Hall of Fame and in 2013, Jackson performed at Super Bowl XLVII.

His next album, New Orleans, Rhythm Soul Blues, was released in 2013, before he was appointed in July 2014 as a cultural ambassador for Mississippi. In February 2015, Jackson was on the cover of that month's issue of Living Blues magazine. Two months later he was one of the star performers at the Byron Bay Bluesfest in New South Wales, Australia. In 2015, he was also named as the Albert King Lifetime Guitar Award recipient. In April 2016, Jackson was a featured performer at the opening of the National Blues Museum in St. Louis, Missouri and played in July 2016 at the Porretta Soul Festival in Bologna, Italy.

His album, The Soul of Jimmie Rodgers, was released by CD Baby, which celebrated Jackson's appreciation of the influence of Jimmie Rodgers on the history of American music. Jackson had said in March 2015, "I like to talk about the triumph of the blues. Looking at struggle and rising above it. It’s an art form derived from the necessities of life, having to navigate oppression." He was a guest performer on the title track of Bobby Rush's 2016 album, Porcupine Meat. It earned Rush a Grammy Award nomination for Best Traditional Blues Album, putting Jackson in competition with Rush for the award.

== Discography ==
=== Solo albums ===
Year	Title	Record label
1996	Vas-tie Jackson	Vas-Kat Records
2003	No Borders to the Blues	VJM Records
2007	Bourbon Street Blues: Live in Nashville	CD Baby
2010	Stimulus Man	VJM Records
2013	New Orleans Rhythm Soul Blues	CD Baby
2016	The Soul of Jimmie Rodgers	CD Baby

== See also ==
- List of electric blues musicians
