= Bring On the Music: Live at the Capitol Theatre =

Live album by Gov't Mule
- Released: June 28, 2019
- Recorded: April 27 and 28, 2018
- Venue: Capitol Theatre, Port Chester, New York, US
- Length: 157:30
- Label: Evil Teen

Gov't Mule chronology
Revolution Come...Revolution Go (2017)	Bring On the Music: Live at the Capitol Theatre (2019)	Heavy Load Blues (2021)

Bring On the Music: Live at the Capitol Theatre is a live album by American band Gov't Mule, released on June 28, 2019, through Mascot Label Group in Europe and Evil Teen Records in the US. It was recorded on April 27 and 28, 2018, at the Capitol Theatre in Port Chester, New York, with its release accompanied by a concert film directed by Danny Clinch. The album was released in a variety of editions, including a standard edition with 21 tracks (referred to as Part 1), as well as a separate double CD and DVD set that includes a different set list (referred to as Part 2).

== Critical reception ==
Professional ratings
Review scores
Source	Rating
All About Jazz	4/5 stars
AllMusic	4/5 stars

Thom Jurek of AllMusic wrote that "throughout, the sound is raw, warm, and full, and Gordie Johnson's mix contains no rounded edges", calling the album "a gift of gratitude to fans for a quarter-century of devotion" that "also makes a fantastic introduction to Gov't Mule, one of the finest hard rock bands ever". Doug Collette of All About Jazz felt that "Haynes and company deserve more than a little credit for not relying on past glories, and accordingly, the earliest vintage selections, in the form of "Thorazine Shuffle," and "Blind Man in the Dark" are balanced with a clutch of numbers from the prior year's studio effort Revolution Come, Revolution Go". Ryan Reed of Relix remarked that the "variety is staggering" and "no live album could replicate the collective catharsis of [Govt Mule's] live show, but Bring on the Music comes close".

== Track listing ==
Standard edition, disc one
No.	Title	Length
1.	"Traveling Tune (Part 1)"	3:22
2.	"Railroad Boy"	5:29
3.	"Mule"	10:16
4.	"Beautifully Broken"	7:13
5.	"Drawn That Way"	5:50
6.	"The Man I Want to Be"	7:05
7.	"Funny Little Tragedy > Message in a Bottle > Funny Little Tragedy"	8:51
8.	"Far Away"	9:00
9.	"Sin's a Good Man's Brother"	4:19
10.	"Mr. Man"	7:40
11.	"Dark Was the Night, Cold Was the Ground"	10:18
Total length:		79:23

Standard edition, disc two
No.	Title	Length
1.	"Life Before Insanity"	6:10
2.	"Thorns of Life"	10:41
3.	"Revolution Come, Revolution Go"	10:04
4.	"No Need to Suffer"	8:36
5.	"Dreams & Songs"	6:52
6.	"Time to Confess"	11:34
7.	"Comeback"	6:09
8.	"World Boss"	5:47
9.	"Bring On the Music"	9:43
10.	"Traveling Tune (Part 2)"	2:31
Total length:		78:07 (157:30)

== Charts ==
Chart performance for Bring On the Music: Live at the Capitol Theatre
Chart (2019)	Peak position
Austrian Albums (Ö3 Austria)	38
Belgian Albums (Ultratop Flanders)	83
Belgian Albums (Ultratop Wallonia)	64
Dutch Albums (Album Top 100)	87
French Albums (SNEP)	121
German Albums (Offizielle Top 100)	11
Swiss Albums (Schweizer Hitparade)	49
US Independent Albums (Billboard)	13
US Indie Store Album Sales (Billboard)	8
