= Heavy Load Blues =

Studio album by Gov't Mule
- Released: November 12, 2021
- Studio: Power Station New England (Waterford, CT)
- Genre: Blues
- Length: 1:17:50
- Label: Fantasy
- Producers: John Paterno; Warren Haynes

Gov't Mule chronology
Revolution Come...Revolution Go (2017)	Heavy Load Blues (2021)	Peace... Like a River (2023)

Heavy Load Blues is the twelfth studio album by American four-piece jam band Gov't Mule. It was released on November 12, 2021, via Fantasy Records, marking the band's second full-length record for the label. Produced by Warren Haynes and John Paterno, the album encompasses a mix of original songs and covers, played with a traditional blues sound. The album is dedicated to Paul Koch.

At the 65th Annual Grammy Awards, the album was nominated for a Grammy Award for Best Traditional Blues Album, but lost to Get on Board.

== Background ==
According to the band's co-founder Warren Haynes, he brooded the idea of making a blues album for years. Having written songs during the COVID-19 lockdowns, he was unsure whether to go solo or record with the band, wondering if the rest of Gov't Mule would be receptive into it. While talking to the band's manager Stefanie Scamardo about their next album, however, she suggested they make blues and when the quartet agreed to the idea, there was one more stipulation: the band had to record two albums simultaneously.

The recording sessions took place in two adjoining rooms at the studio at the Power Station New England in Waterford, with each room set up differently. The room for the blues album had lower ceilings, a smaller drum kit, vintage equipment, guitars and amplifiers, and recorded directly to analog tape to capture an authentic sound. The band dedicated their night time to live tracking of a blues album, while being busy during the day working on the consistent Gov't Mule album (eventually titled Peace... Like a River and released in 2023).

Their version of Howlin' Wolf's "I Asked Her For Water", which Haynes says is the most different from the original and set the tone for the entire project, was recorded first and in one take. "Heavy Load" was recorded last. Haynes cited Elmore James, Junior Wells, Bobby Bland, Tom Waits and Howlin' Wolf as the main inspirations behind the album.

On September 8, 2021, the band announced the release of their upcoming album entitled Heavy Load Blues for November 21, 2021, dubbing it their "first-ever blues album", and also shared a full track list, cover artwork, tour dates and the song "Heavy Load" from the LP.

== Critical reception ==
Professional ratings
Aggregate scores
Source	Rating
Metacritic	84/100
Review scores
Source	Rating
AllMusic	4/5 stars
Classic Rock	3/5 stars
PopMatters	9/10
Record Collector	4/5 stars

Heavy Load Blues was met with generally favorable reviews from music critics. At Metacritic, which assigns a normalized rating out of 100 to reviews from mainstream publications, the album received an average score of 84 based on four reviews.

Michael Elliott of PopMatters praised the album, calling it "a soul-baring journey of the blues, mainly through the lens of soul and hard rock, in all its complexity, beauty, darkness, and glory", he added, "Gov't Mule is at their best when they plug in, reach back to their roots, and dig deep into their soul". AllMusic's Thom Jurek described the album as "raw, heavy, and immediate, the sound of a band unfettered while pursuing a deep blue groove that never quits". In her mixed review for Classic Rock, Emma Johnston wrote: "while it does start to get a little repetitive, it's good to hear a band straying off the beaten track too play timeless music just for the sheer hell of it".

== Track listing ==
No.	Title	Writer(s)	Length
1.	"Blues Before Sunrise"	Elmore James; Joe Josea	3:44
2.	"Hole in My Soul"	Warren Haynes	4:29
3.	"Wake Up Dead"	Haynes; Matt Abts; Daniel Louis Schliftman; Jorgen Carlsson	5:54
4.	"Love Is a Mean Old World"	Haynes; Rick Huckaby; Ray Sisk	4:55
5.	"Snatch It Back and Hold It > Hold It Back > Snatch It Back and Hold It"	Amos Wells Blakemore Jr.; Haynes; Abts; Schliftman; Carlsson	7:55
6.	"Ain't No Love in the Heart of the City"	Michael Price; Dan Walsh	5:36
7.	"(Brother Bill) Last Clean Shirt"	Jerry Leiber; Mike Stoller; Charles Otis	4:12
8.	"Make It Rain"	Kathleen Brennan; Tom Waits	6:41
9.	"Heavy Load"	Haynes	7:18
10.	"Feel Like Breaking Up Somebody's Home"	Al Jackson Jr.; Timothy Matthews	5:44
11.	"If Heartaches Were Nickels"	Haynes	7:28
12.	"I Asked for Water (She Gave Me Gasoline)"	Chester Arthur Burnett	9:05
13.	"Black Horizon"	Haynes	4:49
Total length:			1:17:50

Deluxe edition
No.	Title	Writer(s)	Length
14.	"Hiding Place"	Haynes	7:23
15.	"You Know My Love"	Willie Dixon	4:18
16.	"Street Corner Talking"	Kim Simmonds	6:27
17.	"Have Mercy on the Criminal"	Elton John; Bernie Taupin	6:35
18.	"Long Distance Call"	McKinley Morganfield	4:51
19.	"Feel Like Breaking Up Somebody's Home" (Extended Version)	Jackson Jr.; Matthews	8:36
20.	"Need Your Love So Bad" (Live at London Bluesfest 2017)	William Edward John	5:38
21.	"Good Morning Little School Girl" (Live at Sands Bethlehem Events Center 2018)	John Lee Curtis Williamson	7:27
Total length:			2:09:05

== Personnel ==
- Warren Haynes – vocals, guitar, producer
- Danny Louis – backing vocals, guitar, keyboards
- Jorgen Carlsson – bass, remixing (tracks: 20, 21)
- Matt Abts – drums
- Steve "Hook" Herrera – harmonica (tracks: 1, 18, 21)
- Pamela Fleming – trumpet (tracks: 2, 15)
- Jennifer Hill – tenor saxophone (tracks: 2, 15), baritone saxophone (track 15)
- Buford O'Sullivan – trombone (tracks: 2, 15)
- John Paterno – producer, engineering, mixing
- Evan Bakke – engineering assistant
- Greg Calbi – mastering
- Steve Fallone – mastering
- Stefani Scamardo – executive producer
- Tommy Steele – design
- Jay Sansone – photography
- Jeff Anders – painting

== Charts ==
=== Weekly charts ===
Chart (2021)	Peak position
Austrian Albums (Ö3 Austria)	25
Belgian Albums (Ultratop Flanders)	72
Belgian Albums (Ultratop Wallonia)	102
Dutch Albums (Album Top 100)	70
Finnish Albums (Suomen virallinen lista)	30
French Albums (SNEP)	126
German Albums (Offizielle Top 100)	16
Scottish Albums (Official Charts)	42
Italian Albums (FIMI)	72
Swiss Albums (Schweizer Hitparade)	33
US Billboard 200	158
US Top Album Sales (Billboard)	25
US Top Rock Albums (Billboard)	22
US Top Current Album Sales (Billboard)	16
US Independent Albums (Billboard)	27
US Top Blues Albums (Billboard)	1

=== Year-end charts ===
Chart (2022)	Position
US Top Blues Albums (Billboard)	2
