= Rawer than Raw =

2020 album by Bobby Rush

Studio album by Bobby Rush
- Released: August 28, 2020
- Genre: Blues
- Label: Deep Rush
- Producer: Bobby Rush

Bobby Rush chronology
Sitting on Top of the Blues (2019)	Rawer than Raw (2020)	All My Love for You (2023)

Rawer than Raw is an album by blues musician Bobby Rush. It was released on CD and LP on August 28, 2020.

On this album, Rush sings and plays acoustic guitar and harmonica, without accompaniment by other musicians. It contains five original songs (credited to his real name, Emmett Ellis Jr.) and six covers.

Rawer than Raw won a Grammy Award for Best Traditional Blues Album.

== Critical reception ==
On AllMusic, Stephen Thomas Erlewine said, "The title Rawer than Raw is a nod to how this 2020 album is rawer than Raw, the 2007 record that found Bobby Rush devoting himself to acoustic blues for the first time in his lengthy career.... Hearing Rush play with just a guitar or two is a different experience than his full-bodied soul-blues revues."

In Blues Blast Magazine, John Mitchell said, "... this one mixes Bobby's songs (some reprised from earlier, electric discs) with a few of his influences, all drawn from the Mississippi Delta tradition.... Maybe a second volume is called for, Bobby! Meanwhile enjoy this fine album of authentic Delta blues played by the one and only Bobby Rush."

In Rock & Blues Muse, Martine Ehrenclou said, "I love this album. Rawer than Raw isn't a rehash of blues classics blended with originals. It’s an outstanding release, raw and authentic, with Bobby Rush's own personal stamp on each track. He's one of the best and is still creating simply great music well into his 80s."

== Track listing ==
This is the track listing for the CD. The LP contains the same songs in a different order.

1. "Down in Mississippi" (Emmett Ellis Jr., i.e. Bobby Rush)
2. "Hard Times" (Skip James)
3. "Let Me In Your House" (Ellis)
4. "Smokestack Lightning" (Chester Burnett)
5. "Shake It for Me" (Burnett)
6. "Sometimes I Wonder" (Ellis)
7. "Don't Start Me Talkin'" (Sonny Boy Williamson)
8. "Let's Make Love Again" (Ellis)
9. "Honey Bee, Sail On" (McKinley Morganfield)
10. "Garbage Man" (Ellis)
11. "Dust My Broom" (Robert Johnson)

== Personnel ==
Musicians

- Bobby Rush – vocals, acoustic guitar, harmonica

Production

- Produced by Bobby Rush
- Executive producers: Randy Everett, Jeff Delia
- Engineer, mixing: Randy Everett
- Assistant engineer: Ron Carbo
- Mastering: Margaret Luthar
- Artwork: Andy Sundin
- Photography: Kim Welsh, Randy Everett
