= Ain't Done with the Blues =

Studio album by Buddy Guy
- Released: July 30, 2025
- Studios: Blackbird; The Switchyard; Esplanade Studios; Solmonie Studio; Sunset Sound
- Genre: Blues
- Length: 64:42
- Labels: Silvertone; RCA
- Producer: Tom Hambridge

Buddy Guy chronology
The Blues Don't Lie (2022)	Ain't Done with the Blues (2025)

Professional ratings
Review scores
Source	Rating
AllMusic	4/5 stars

Ain't Done with the Blues is the twentieth studio album by American blues musician Buddy Guy. It was released on July 30, 2025 (Guy's 89th birthday), via Silvertone/RCA Records. The recording sessions took place at Blackbird Studio and The Switchyard in Nashville, at Esplanade Studios in New Orleans, at Solmonie Studio, and at Sunset Sound in Hollywood. Produced by Tom Hambridge, it features guest appearances from Christone "Kingfish" Ingram, Joe Bonamassa, Joe Walsh, Peter Frampton and The Blind Boys of Alabama.

The album won the Grammy Award for Best Traditional Blues Album on February 1, 2026, at the 68th Annual Grammy Awards.

== Track listing ==
No.	Title	Writer(s)	Length
1.	"Hooker Thing"	Bernard Besman; John Lee Hooker	1:08
2.	"Been There Done That"	Gary Nicholson; Tom Hambridge	3:48
3.	"Blues Chase the Blues Away"	Nicholson; Hambridge	4:49
4.	"Where U At?" (featuring Christone "Kingfish" Ingram)	Hambridge	4:02
5.	"Blues on Top"	Richard Fleming; Hambridge	4:57
6.	"I Got Sumpin' for You"	Eddie Jones	2:32
7.	"How Blues Is That" (featuring Joe Walsh)	Fleming; Hambridge	4:23
8.	"Dry Stick" (featuring Joe Bonamassa)	George Guy; Nicholson; Hambridge	4:42
9.	"It Keeps Me Young" (featuring Peter Frampton)	Fleming; Hambridge	2:56
10.	"Love on a Budget"	Jimmy Tennant; Fleming; Hambridge	3:49
11.	"Jesus Loves the Sinner" (featuring the Blind Boys of Alabama)	Fleming; Hambridge	4:14
12.	"Upside Down"	Fleming; Hambridge	3:12
13.	"One from Lightnin'"	Preston Foster	1:10
14.	"I Don't Forget"	Fleming; Hambridge	3:31
15.	"Trick Bag"	Earl King	4:29
16.	"Swamp Poker"	Hambridge	5:01
17.	"Send Me Some Loving"	John Marascalco; Leo Price	2:45
18.	"Talk to Your Daughter"	J. B. Lenoir; Alex Adams	3:14
Total length:			64:42

== Charts ==
Chart (2025)	Peak position
Australian Jazz & Blues Albums (ARIA)	4
Belgian Albums (Ultratop Wallonia)	142
German Albums (Offizielle Top 100)	65
Scottish Albums (Official Charts)	34
Swiss Albums (Schweizer Hitparade)	14
UK Americana Albums (Official Charts)	8
UK Jazz & Blues Albums (Official Charts)	1
US Top Album Sales (Billboard)	29
US Top Current Album Sales (Billboard)	20
US Top Blues Albums (Billboard)	1
