= Jump for Joy (Koko Taylor album) =

Album by the American musician Koko Taylor, released in 1990

Studio album by Koko Taylor
- Released: 1990
- Studio: Streeterville
- Genre: Blues, R&B
- Label: Alligator
- Producer: Bruce Iglauer, Koko Taylor, Criss Johnson

Koko Taylor chronology
Live from Chicago: An Audience with the Queen (1987)	Jump for Joy (1990)	Wang Dang Doodle (1991)

Jump for Joy is an album by the American musician Koko Taylor, released in 1990. Its release corresponded with Taylor's appearance in David Lynch's Wild at Heart. Taylor supported the album with a North American tour. Jump for Joy was nominated for a Grammy Award for "Best Contemporary Blues Recording". It is dedicated to her husband, who died in 1989.

== Production ==
The album was produced by Bruce Iglauer, Taylor, and Criss Johnson; Johnson also played guitar. The horns were arranged by Gene "Daddy G" Barge. Taylor wrote or cowrote four of Jump for Joy's songs.

"It's a Dirty Job" is a duet with Lonnie Brooks. "Hey Baby" is a cover of the Ted Nugent song. Billy Branch played harmonica on the title track.

== Critical reception ==
Professional ratings
Review scores
Source	Rating
AllMusic	3/5 stars
Calgary Herald	A
The Encyclopedia of Popular Music	3/5 stars
Orlando Sentinel	5/5 stars
The Penguin Guide to Blues Recordings	3/4 stars
Tulsa World	3.5/4 stars

The Orlando Sentinel wrote that Taylor's "roof-shaking voice is as powerful as ever, and she has great backing and material, including four originals." The Washington Post opined that "it's the boomingly defiant blues and Taylor's unusually subdued and moving performance of the ballad 'Time Will Tell' that ultimately makes Jump for Joy the treat that it is." The Edmonton Journal determined that "Taylor's voice kindles memories of a young Aretha Franklin or Etta James."

The St. Petersburg Times deemed the album "a typically high-spirited affair," writing that "the production is clean and crisp, the arrangements lean and funky." The Calgary Herald called it "an invigorating R&B set from one of the best blues shouters to come out of Chicago in the last 20 years." The Press of Atlantic City considered it "near close to a perfect R&B record."

== Track listing ==
No.	Title	Length
1.	"Can't Let Go"
2.	"Stop Watching Your Enemies"
3.	"Hey Baby"
4.	"Tired of That"
5.	"It's a Dirty Job"
6.	"Jump for Joy"
7.	"Time Will Tell"
8.	"The Eyes Don't Lie"
9.	"Fishing Trip"
10.	"I Don't Want No Leftovers"
