= Force of Nature (Koko Taylor album) =

Studio album by Koko Taylor
- Released: 1993
- Genre: Blues
- Length: 64:28
- Label: Alligator
- Producer: Criss Johnson, Koko Taylor, Bruce Iglauer

Koko Taylor chronology
Jump for Joy (1992)	Force of Nature (1993)	Royal Blue (2000)

Force of Nature is a blues album by Koko Taylor, released in 1993 by Alligator Records. Taylor duetted with Buddy Guy on the cover of "Born Under a Bad Sign". "Mother Nature" was written by Little Milton.

== Critical reception ==
Professional ratings
Review scores
Source	Rating
Chicago Tribune	3/4 stars
The Penguin Guide to Blues Recordings	2/4 stars

The Guardian noted that "her lung-bursting style is remarkably intact, and showed off to perfection on earth-shaking 'Hound Dog'."

== Track listing ==
1. "Mother Nature" (Milton Campbell) – 4:41
2. "If I Can't Be First" (Ike Turner) – 3:40
3. "Hound Dog" (Jerry Leiber, Mike Stoller) – 5:33
4. "Born Under a Bad Sign" with Buddy Guy (William Bell, Booker T. Jones) – 6:22
5. "Let the Juke Joint Jump" (Vasti Jackson) – 6:08
6. "63 Year Old Mama" (Koko Taylor) – 4:29
7. "Don't Put Your Hands on Me" (Rick Estrin) – 2:53
8. "Bad Case of Loving You (Doctor, Doctor)" (Moon Martin) – 4:23
9. "Fish in Dirty Water" (Fleecie Moore, Spencer) – 5:45
10. "Tit for Tat" (Bucky Lindsey, Larry Shell) – 4:31
11. "Put the Pot On" (Koko Taylor) – 3:48
12. "Nothing Takes the Place of You" (Toussaint McCall, Alan Robinson) – 4:41
13. "Spellbound" (Koko Taylor) – 4:07
14. "Greedy Man" (Morris Dollison) – 3:27
