= The Blues Is Alive and Well =

Studio album by Buddy Guy
- Released: June 15, 2018
- Genre: Blues
- Length: 64:04
- Producer: Tom Hambridge

Buddy Guy chronology
Born to Play Guitar (2015)	The Blues Is Alive and Well (2018)	The Blues Don't Lie (2022)

The Blues Is Alive and Well is the 18th studio album by American blues musician Buddy Guy. It was released on June 15, 2018, by RCA/Silvertone Records.

The Blues Is Alive and Well won the Grammy Award for Best Traditional Blues Album at the 61st Grammy Awards.

Keith Richards and Jeff Beck play guitar on the song "Cognac", and Mick Jagger plays harmonica on the song "You Did the Crime". The front cover photograph was taken by Chuck Lanza at State Highway 1, Lettsworth, Louisiana where Guy was born in 1936.

== Critical reception ==
In DownBeat, Bobby Reed wrote, "... Guy delivers what one would expect from an 81-year-old elder statesman (albeit one who performs like someone half his age). This album is filled with Guy's trademark, stinging electric guitar solos – each packing enough power to peel paint off a house. Guy's guitar heroics attract so much attention that his vocal prowess has long been underrated, and his voice remains in superb shape, a supple instrument with impressive range."

On AllMusic, Stephen Thomas Erlewine said, "The Blues Is Alive and Well is full of songs charged with mortality.... [The album] has a lot of songs in general – a full 15, lasting well over an hour. This excessive length means there's a lot of room for levity, too, including James Bay sitting in for a duet on 'Blue No More', Mick Jagger's wailing harp on 'You Did the Crime', and, best of all, a showdown with Keith Richards and Jeff Beck on 'Cognac'."

In Blues Blast, Mark Thompson wrote, "Throughout his career, Buddy Guy has been known for his guitar prowess. Oftentimes, his skill as a singer would slide by with little notice. On this release, he consistently reaches into the emotional depths, often with bone-chilling intensity, conveying hard-earned lessons on life and the people you meet along the way."

On Rock and Blues Muse, Dave Resto said, "It was a lifetime ago when the Lettsworth, Louisiana native followed his dreams and moved to Chicago to make his fortune. There, he worked as the house guitarist at Chess Records where he formed musical alliances with Muddy Waters and Junior Wells and went on to influence generations of legendary guitarists. Today, the 81-year-old Guy boasts a long list of accomplishments in the music industry. The Blues Is Alive and Well is Guy's assertion that both he and the genre still have a lot to say."

== Track listing ==
No.	Title	Writer(s)	Length
1.	"A Few Good Years"	Richard Fleming, Tom Hambridge	4:47
2.	"Guilty as Charged"	Richard Fleming, Tom Hambridge	3:20
3.	"Cognac" (featuring Jeff Beck, Keith Richards)	Buddy Guy, Richard Fleming, Tom Hambridge	5:22
4.	"The Blues Is Alive and Well"	Gary Nicholson, Tom Hambridge	5:13
5.	"Bad Day"	Mac Davis, Tom Hambridge	3:18
6.	"Blue No More" (featuring James Bay)	Jamey Johnson, Tom Hambridge	3:39
7.	"Whiskey for Sale"	Tom Hambridge	4:02
8.	"You Did the Crime" (featuring Mick Jagger)	Richard Fleming, Tom Hambridge	6:53
9.	"Old Fashioned"	Buddy Guy, Tom Hambridge	3:57
10.	"When My Day Comes"	Bill Sweeney, Tom Hambridge	4:38
11.	"Nine Below Zero"	Sonny Boy Williamson	6:19
12.	"Ooh Daddy"	Richard Fleming, Tom Hambridge	3:17
13.	"Somebody Up There"	Richard Fleming, Tom Hambridge	4:27
14.	"End of the Line"	Richard Fleming, Tom Hambridge	3:25
15.	"Milking Muther for Ya"	Buddy Guy	0:57
Total length:			64:04

Japan bonus track
No.	Title	Writer(s)	Length
16.	"In This Day and Age"	Buddy Guy, Tom Hambridge, Richard Fleming	4:43
Total length:			68:54

"Milking Muther for Ya" contains a portion of "Mother Fuyer" written by Red Nelson.

== Personnel ==
Musicians

- Buddy Guy – lead guitar, vocals
- Rob McNelley – rhythm guitar, slide guitar
- Kevin McKendree – keyboards: Electric piano [Wurlitzer], Organ [B3] (1), Mellotron (4), Upright piano (2, 3, 5, 6, 8), Clavinet (7)
- Willie Weeks – bass
- Tom Hambridge – drums
- Tommy MacDonald – Bass (6)
- Horns – The Muscle Shoals Horns*
- Baritone Saxophone – Jim Hoke (4)
- Tenor Saxophone – Doug Moffet (4)
- James Bay – Vocals, Guitar (6)
- Mick Jagger – harmonica (8)
- Keith Richards – guitar (3)
- Jeff Beck – guitar (3)
- Bohár Dániel – faszbőgő

Production

- Produced by Tom Hambridge
- Recording: Ducky Carlisle
- Mixing: Michael Saint-Leon, Tom Hambridge
- Mastering: Greg Calbi at Sterling Sound
- Art direction, design: Jeff Schulz
- Photography: Chuck Lanza, Paul Natkin

== Charts ==
Chart (2018)	Peak position
Australian Albums (ARIA)	45
Austrian Albums (Ö3 Austria)	22
Belgian Albums (Ultratop Flanders)	43
Belgian Albums (Ultratop Wallonia)	53
Canadian Albums (Billboard)	58
Czech Albums (ČNS IFPI)	57
Dutch Albums (Album Top 100)	57
German Albums (Offizielle Top 100)	14
Italian Albums (FIMI)	72
Japanese Albums (Oricon)	121
Polish Albums (ZPAV)	26
Scottish Albums (Official Charts)	22
Spanish Albums (PROMUSICAE)	60
Swiss Albums (Schweizer Hitparade)	4
UK Albums (Official Charts)	65
US Billboard 200	69
