= Koko Taylor (album) =

Studio album by Koko Taylor
- Released: 1969
- Recorded: 1965–1968
- Studio: Ter Mar, Chicago, Illinois, United States
- Genre: Blues
- Length: 33:49
- Language: English
- Label: Chess/MCA
- Producer: Willie Dixon

Koko Taylor chronology
| Koko Taylor (1969) | Basic Soul (1972) |

Koko Taylor is the debut studio album by American blues singer Koko Taylor, released in 1969 via MCA/Chess Records. It has received positive critical reception.

== Reception ==
The editorial staff of AllMusic Guide gave Koko Taylor 4.5 out of five stars, with reviewer Bill Dahl commenting that it "is one of the strongest representations of the belter's Chess days available".

== Track listing ==
All songs written by Willie Dixon, except where noted

1. "Love You Like a Woman" (Morris Dollison) – 2:06
2. "I Love a Lover Like You" (Choice, Glover, and Merriwether) – 2:43
3. "Don't Mess with the Messer" – 2:42
4. "I Don't Care Who Knows" – 2:10
5. "Wang Dang Doodle" – 2:58
6. "I'm a Little Mixed Up" (Betty James and Clarence Johnson) – 2:39
7. "Nitty Gritty" (Koko Taylor) – 2:42
8. "Fire" – 2:28
9. "Whatever I Am You Made Me" – 2:25
10. "Twenty Nine Ways" – 3:09
11. "Insane Asylum" – 4:15
12. "Yes, It's Good For You" – 2:39

2001 reissue bonus tracks

13. "Love Sick Tears" (unknown) – 2:47
14. "He Always Knocks Me Out" (unknown) – 3:04

== Personnel ==
Personnel and recording dates for all tracks are unknown. The following details come from the 2001 CD re-release liner notes:

"Love You Like a Woman" (recorded October 1968)

- Koko Taylor – vocals

"I Love a Lover Like You" (recorded April 23, 1969)

- Koko Taylor – vocals
- Willie Dixon – bass guitar
- Buddy Guy – guitar
- Walter "Shakey" Horton – harmonica
- Clifton James – drums
- Albert "Sunnyland Slim" Luandrew – piano
- Matt Murphy – guitar (possibly)
- Johnny Shines – guitar (possibly)

"Don’t Mess with the Messer" (recorded on January 20, 1965)

- Koko Taylor – vocals
- Willie Dixon – double bass
- Buddy Guy – guitar
- Clifton James – drums
- Lafayette Leake – piano
- Matt Murphy – guitar
- unknown saxophone players and background vocalists

"I Don’t Care Who Knows" (recorded October 1968)

- Koko Taylor – vocals

"Wang Dang Doodle" (recorded on December 7, 1965)

- Koko Taylor – vocals
- Gene Barge – saxophone
- Fred Below – drums
- Willie Dixon – backing vocals
- Buddy Guy – guitar
- Donald Hankins – saxophone
- Lafayette Leake – piano
- Jack Meyers – bass guitar
- Johnny "Twist" Williams – guitar

"I’m a Little Mixed Up" (recorded in 1965)

- Koko Taylor – vocals
- Gene Barge – tenor saxophone
- Willie Dixon – double bass
- Buddy Guy – guitar
- Clifton James – drums
- Lafayette Leake – piano
- unknown background vocalists

"Nitty Gritty"

- Koko Taylor – vocals
- Buddy Guy – guitar
- Walter "Shakey" Horton – harmonic
- Clifton James – drums
- Lafayette Leake – piano (possibly)
- Albert "Sunnyland Slim" Luandrew – piano (possibly)
- Jack Meyers – bass guitar
- Matt Murphy – guitar (possibly)
- Johnny Shines – guitar (possibly)

"Fire" (recorded August 1967)

- Koko Taylor – vocals
- Gene Barge – tenor saxophone
- Willie Dixon – vocals
- Buddy Guy – guitar
- Lafayette Leake – piano, organ
- Johnny "Twist" Williams – guitar
- unknown bass guitarist and drummer

"Whatever I Am, You Made Me" (recorded January 20, 1965)

- Koko Taylor – vocals
- Willie Dixon – double bass
- Buddy Guy – guitar
- Clifton James – drums
- Lafayette Leake – piano
- Matt Murphy – guitar
- unknown saxophonist and background vocalist

"Twenty-Nine Ways"

- Koko Taylor – vocals
- Willie Dixon – double bass
- Buddy Guy – guitar
- Walter "Shakey" Horton – harmonica
- Clifton James – drums
- Lafayette Leake – piano (possibly)
- Albert "Sunnyland Slim" Luandrew – piano (possibly)
- Matt Murphy – guitar (possibly)
- Johnny Shines – guitar (possibly)

"Insane Asylum" (recorded August 1967)

- Koko Taylor – vocals
- Gene Barge – tenor saxophone
- Willie Dixon – vocals
- Buddy Guy – guitar
- Lafayette Leake – piano, organ
- Johnny "Twist" Williams – guitar
- unknown bass guitarist and drummer

"Yes, It’s Good for You" (recorded October 1968)

- Koko Taylor – vocals

"Love Sick Tears" (recorded 20 January 1965)

- Koko Taylor – vocals
- Willie Dixon – double bass
- Clifton James – drums
- Buddy Guy – guitar
- Matt Murphy – guitar
- Lafayette Leake – piano

"He Always Knocks Me Out"

- Koko Taylor – vocals
- Willie Dixon – double bass
- Buddy Guy – guitar
- Walter "Shakey" Horton – harmonica
- Clifton James – drums
- Lafayette Leake – piano (possibly)
- Matt Murphy – guitar (possibly)
- Albert "Sunnyland Slim" Luandrew – piano (possibly)
- Johnny Shines – guitar (possibly)

Technical personnel

- Gene Barge – arrangement
- Malcolm Chisholm – engineering
- Willie Dixon – arrangement, production
- Ron Malo – engineering
- Don Wilson – illustration

Reissue personnel

- Geary Chansley – photography
- Bill Dahl – liner notes
- Daily Planet – cover design
- Mike Diehl – design
- Doug Fulton – photography
- Erick Labson – remastering at Universal Mastering Studios
- Andy McKaie – reissue production
- Bob Schnieders – research
- Leni Sinclair – inlay photography
- Vartan – art direction
