= Don't Give Up on Love =

Studio album by Don Bryant
- Released: May 12, 2017
- Length: 37:56
- Label: Fat Possum

Don Bryant chronology
It's All in the World (2000)	Don't Give Up on Love (2017)	You Make Me Feel (2020)

Professional ratings
Aggregate scores
Source	Rating
Metacritic	83/100
Review scores
Source	Rating
AllMusic	3.5/5 stars
Paste	8.7/10

Don't Give Up On Love is the second studio album by American rhythm and blues musician Don Bryant. It was released on May 12, 2017, through Fat Possum Records

== Track listing ==
No.	Title	Length
1.	"A Nickel and a Nail"	4:46
2.	"Something About You"	3:37
3.	"It Was Jealousy"	4:12
4.	"First You Cry"	4:33
5.	"I Got to Know"	3:07
6.	"Don't Give Up on Love"	5:05
7.	"How Do I Get There"	3:55
8.	"Can't Hide the Hurt"	2:55
9.	"One Ain't Enough"	3:03
10.	"What Kind of Love"	2:43

== Charts ==
Chart (2017)	Peak position
Dutch Albums (Album Top 100)	187
