= Dexter Allen =

American blues musician, singer, songwriter and guitarist

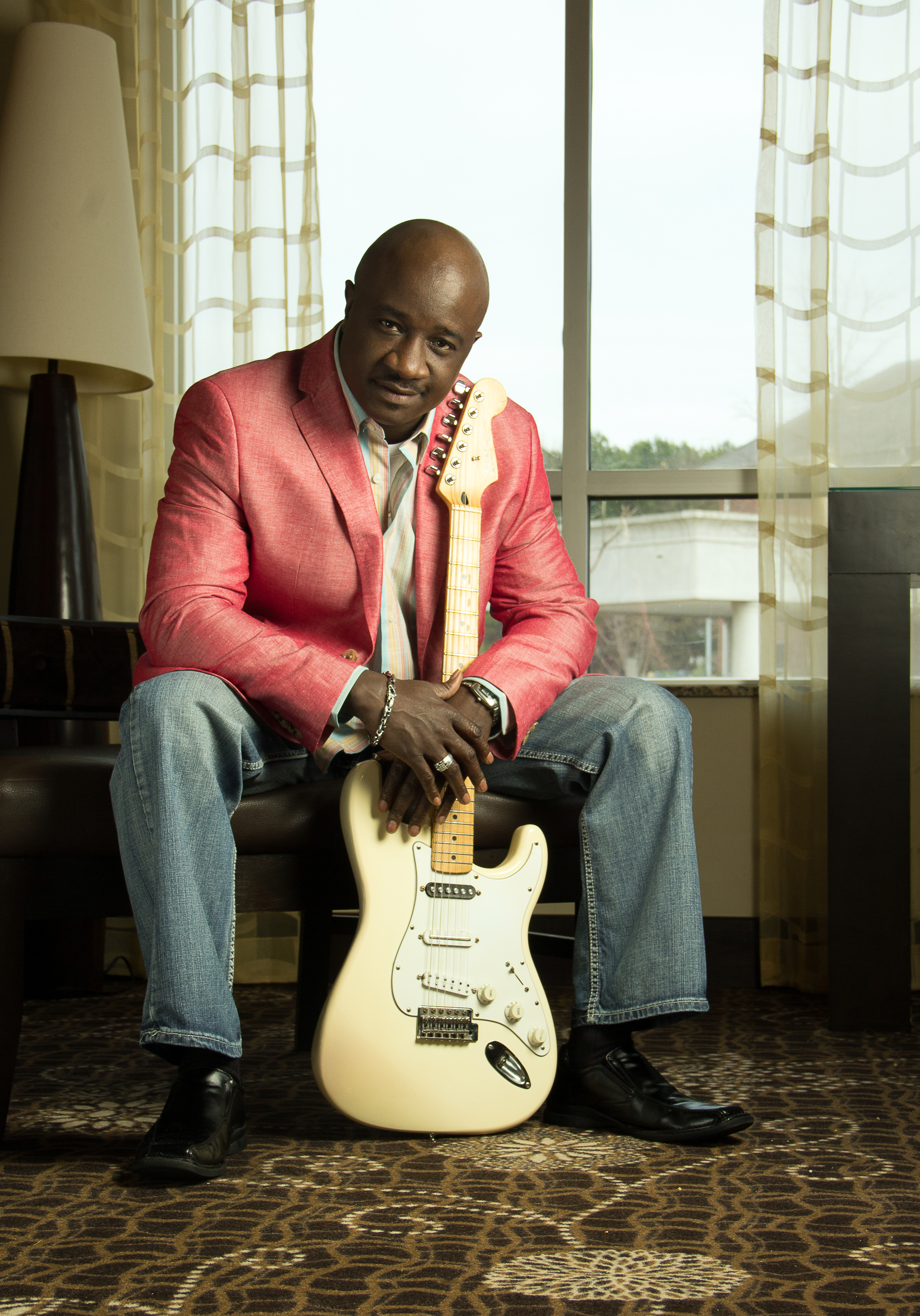
- Dexter Allen's promotional picture by Erica Johnson-Hicks

Background information
- Born: Dexter Allen; July 10, 1970 (age 56) near Crystal Springs, Mississippi United States
- Origin: Jackson, Mississippi, United States
- Genres: Blues, soul
- Occupations: Musician, singer, songwriter, record producer
- Instruments: Vocals, guitar, bass guitar, keyboard
- Labels: Pass the Pick, Deep Rush Records
- Website: www.dexterallen.com

Dexter Allen (born July 10, 1970) is an American blues musician, singer, songwriter and guitarist.

Formerly the lead guitarist for the Airtight Band and blues musician Bobby Rush, Allen received a Jackson Music Award in 2008 for Male Vocalist of the Year. That same year, he debuted his first album titled Bluezin My Way. His work on the album resulted in another Jackson Music Award in 2009 for Entertainer of the Year. Allen then released a Christmas CD in December 2009 called Hello Ms. Santa Claus. In 2011, he released his second album, Bluezin for Life. In 2014, he released an album entitled Bluez of My Soul. His accomplishments included being signed to Bobby Rush’s record label, Deep Rush Records, and appearing as a guitarist in the 2014 James Brown biopic, Get On Up. In 2015, Allen released an album titled Trilogy of My Bluez. In 2018, he released a live album titled Dexter Allen: Live From Ground Zero Blues Club.

== Early life ==
Allen was born in Crystal Springs, Mississippi, to Willie Lee Allen (father) and Ruthie Mae Allen (mother) on July 10, 1970. Allen has three sisters, Olivia Ann Allen, Phalethia Lundy and Sara Allen, and one brother, Corey Allen. He was brought up on a farm, where he helped raise crops and livestock to sell. His father was the pastor of Christian Open Door Church, a non-denominational assembly, where his grandfather, Calvin Dixon, was also a deacon. His mother worked for Farm Bureau Insurance and retired after 30 years of employment.

His father was also the member of the gospel group The Christian Travelers, and Allen began playing bass guitar for the group at age 12. Other groups he played for at that time include The Dixon Singers and The Robinson Brotherhood.

== Career ==
=== 1995–2008 ===
In 1995, Allen decided to elevate his musical career by moving to Jackson, Mississippi, the state capitol. At that point, he signed with his first record company, the independent label Airtight Records. He sang and played with the Airtight Band in addition to sharing his talent at local churches. This exposure led to him becoming the lead guitarist for blues musician Bobby Rush.

While in Rush's band, Allen was exposed to what blues has to offer worldwide. The experience gave him a chance to travel and perform internationally for hundreds of thousands of blues fans, and to learn what it took to succeed in the blues music industry.

=== 2008–present ===
In 2008, Allen won the 2008 Jackson Music Award for Male Vocalist of the Year. It was at this point when Allen decided to strike out on his own and record his first album entitled Bluezin My Way, an album with themes such as love, lust and deception. He was awarded for his efforts once again with the 2009 Jackson Music Award for Entertainer of the Year. Most recently, Allen portrayed a bass guitarist in the 2014 film, Get On Up, a biopic about the life of the late entertainer James Brown. In September 2014, Allen was in a music video for his song from the album Bluez of my Soul, "Coming Home to Mississippi."

Some of Allen's performances throughout North America were at the following:

- Chicago Blues Fest, Chicago, Illinois
- King Biscuit Blues Festival, Helena, Arkansas
- Mississippi Valley Blues Festival, Davenport, Iowa
- South Side Shuffle, Missasaugua, Canada
- Beauport Blues Fest, Quebec, Canada
- Ameristar Casino, Vicksburg, Mississippi
- Hard Rock Cafe, Memphis, Tennessee
- Ground Zero Blues Club, Memphis, Tennessee

Five of Allen's songs were listed on the Roots Music Report's Weekly Top 50 Mississippi Song Chart for the week of July 20, 2014.

Allen's 2018 live album, Dexter Allen: Live From Ground Zero Blues Club, was filmed in HD video - including club owner Morgan Freeman introducing him to kick off the show. UK's Blues & Rhythm Magazine's review described Allen as "a supremely gifted guitarist and singer" and wrote that "incredible notes seem to fly effortlessly from his guitar."

His upcoming tour schedule includes the sold-out Legendary Rhythm & Blues Cruise.

== Equipment ==
Allen performs on a Fender Stratocaster guitar.

== Philanthropy ==
After being inducted into the Mississippi Artist Roster, Allen now provides workshops through the Mississippi Musicians Hall of Fame in area schools and works with children with autism in summer programs in order to continue promoting heritage blues music.

== Discography ==
=== Studio albums ===
- Bluezin My Way (2008)
- Hello Ms. Santa Claus (2009)
- Bluezin for Life (2011)
- Bluez of My Soul (2014)
- Trilogy of My Bluez (2015)
- Dexter Allen: Live From Ground Zero Blues Club

== Honors and awards ==
- In 2008, he received the Vocalist of the Year award from the Jackson Music Awards Association.
- In 2009, he received the Entertainer of the Year award from the Jackson Music Awards Association.
- On February 4, 2014, he received a resolution from the city of Crystal Springs, Mississippi for his accomplishments in the blues genre.
- In 2014, he received House Concurrent Resolution No. 54 from the Mississippi Legislature for Accomplishments in Blues Music. The resolution was adopted by the House of Representatives on February 28 and the Senate on March 4.
