= A Christmas Celebration of Hope =

Studio album by B.B. King
- Released: November 6, 2001
- Recorded: June 2001
- Genre: Blues, Christmas
- Length: 48:15
- Label: MCA
- Producer: Michael Abene, B.B. King

A Christmas Celebration of Hope is the thirty ninth studio album by American blues guitarist and singer-songwriter B.B. King released in November 2001 through MCA Records. It is a holiday album.

In the United States, A Christmas Celebration of Hope reached peak positions of number 151 on the Billboard 200, number one on Billboard's Top Blues Albums chart and number 21 on the Top Holiday Albums chart. The album earned King two Grammy Awards at the 45th Grammy Awards (2003): he, Anthony Daigle and John Holbrook were presented the award for Best Traditional Blues Album and the track "Auld Lang Syne" earned King the award for Best Pop Instrumental Performance.

== Composition ==
A Christmas Celebration of Hope contains 13 tracks totaling approximately 48 minutes in length. Produced by B.B. King himself and recorded in Lafayette, Louisiana at Dockside Recording Studios in June 2001. Some of the songs, including "Merry Christmas, Baby" have roots in blues or rhythm and blues. Nashville String Machine contribute strings to three tracks. King had originally recorded "Christmas Celebration" in 1960. The instrumental "Christmas Love" marks King's only original track on the album (credited as Riley King). The album's closing track, an instrumental version of "Auld Lang Syne", was described by Richie Unterberger as "funky".

== Reception ==
Professional ratings
Review scores
Source	Rating
Allmusic	2.5/5 stars

In his review for Allmusic, Richie Unterberger awarded the album 2.5 out of 5 stars and called the collection an "adequate, good-humored reprisal". Unterberger thought only "Please Come Home for Christmas" was overproduced and concluded his review with the statement: "It's hardly the first King you'll pull off your shelf, and not the first R&B Christmas album you'll turn to either, but you could do worse in the holiday season."

A Christmas Celebration of Hope earned King the Grammy Award for Best Traditional Blues Album at the 45th Grammy Awards (2003); awards were also presented to Anthony Daigle and John Holbrook. The track "Auld Lang Syne" earned King the Grammy Award for Best Pop Instrumental Performance.

== Track listing ==
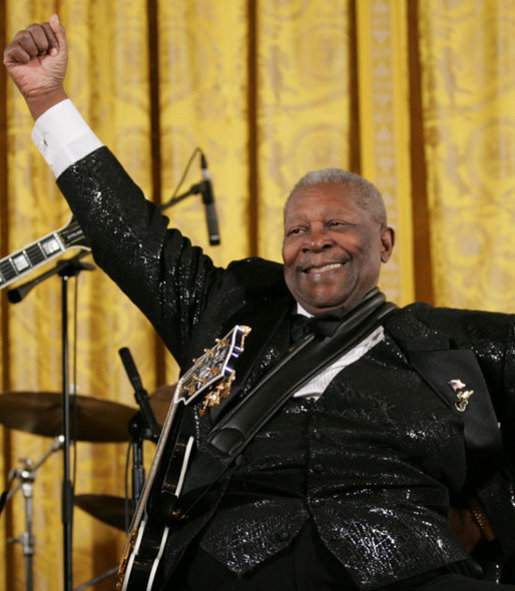
B.B. King in 2006; "Christmas Love" is credited to King

No.	Title	Writer(s)	Length
1.	"Please Come Home for Christmas"	Charles Brown, Gene Redd	4:53
2.	"Lonesome Christmas"	Lloyd Glenn	3:04
3.	"Back Door Santa"	Clarence Carter, Marcus Daniel	3:26
4.	"Christmas in Heaven"	Billy Ward	4:49
5.	"I'll Be Home for Christmas"	Kim Gannon, Walter Kent, Buck Ram	3:47
6.	"To Someone That I Love"	Brown	5:01
7.	"Christmas Celebration"	B.B. King	3:38
8.	"Merry Christmas, Baby"	Page Cavanaugh, Jack Smalley	3:56
9.	"Christmas Love"	King	2:57
10.	"Blue Decorations"	Jerry Gillespie	3:27
11.	"Christmas Comes But Once a Year"	Amos Milburn, Albert Shubert	4:15
12.	"Bringing in a Brand New Year"	Brown	2:41
13.	"Auld Lang Syne"	Robert Burns, traditional	2:21

Track listing adapted from Allmusic.

== Personnel ==
- Michael Abene – producer
- Stanley Abernathy – trumpet
- James Bolden – conductor, trumpet
- Robert Burns – composer
- Jay Burton – engineer
- Clarence Carter – composer
- Page Cavanaugh – composer
- Tony Coleman – tambourine
- Rich Costey – assistant
- Anthony Daigle – engineer
- Marcus Daniel – composer
- Mike Doster – bass guitar
- Devin Emk – assistant
- Calep Emphrey – drums
- Kim Gannon – composer
- Lloyd Glenn – composer
- Josiah Gluck – engineer, mixing
- John Holbrook – mixing
- S. "Husky" Höskulds – engineer
- Melvin Jackson – saxophone
- Walter Kent – composer
- B.B. King – arranger, producer
- Walter King – contractor
- Floyd Lieberman – executive producer
- Stephen Marcussen – mastering
- Ken Quartarone – assistant
- Buck Ram – composer
- Jack Smalley – composer
- Jesse Thomas – composer
- James Toney – keyboards
- Vartan – art direction
- Leon Warren – guitar
- Kevin Westenberg – photography

Credits adapted from Allmusic.

== Charts ==
In the United States, A Christmas Celebration of Hope reached peak positions of number 151 on the Billboard 200, number one on Billboard's Top Blues Albums chart and number 21 on the Top Holiday Albums chart. The album marked King's fourth to reach the Top Blues Albums chart's number one position. A Christmas Celebration of Hope remained on the Billboard 200 and Top Holiday Albums charts for three weeks; the album remained on the Top Blues Albums chart for ten weeks, including five at the number one position.

Chart (2001)	Peak position
U.S. Billboard 200	151
U.S. Top Blues Albums	1
U.S. Top Holiday Albums	21
