= Porcupine Meat =

Studio album by Bobby Rush
- Released: September 16, 2016
- Genre: Blues
- Length: 56:51
- Label: Rounder
- Producer: Scott Billington

Bobby Rush chronology
Decisions (2014)	Porcupine Meat (2016)	Sitting on Top of the Blues (2019)

Porcupine Meat is an album by blues musician Bobby Rush. It was released by Rounder Records on September 16, 2016. It debuted at number 23 on the Billboard Top R&B Albums chart.

Porcupine Meat won the 2017 Grammy Award for Best Traditional Blues Album.

== Track listing ==
All songs written by Bobby Rush, except "Got Me Accused" by Bobby Rush and Scott Billington, and "Snake in the Grass" and "Catfish Stew" by Bobby Rush, Scott Billington, and Johnette Downing.

1. "I Don't Want Nobody Hanging Around"
2. "Porcupine Meat" (featuring Vasti Jackson)
3. "Got Me Accused"
4. "Snake in the Grass"
5. "Funk o' de Funk"
6. "Me, Myself and I" (featuring Joe Bonamassa)
7. "Catfish Stew"
8. "It's Your Move" (featuring Dave Alvin)
9. "Nighttime Gardener" (featuring Keb' Mo')
10. "I Think Your Dress Is Too Short"
11. "Standing on Shaky Ground"
12. "I'm Tired" (Tangle Eye Mix)

== Personnel ==
Musicians

- Bobby Rush – vocals, harmonica
- Vasti Jackson – guitar
- Shane Theriot – electric and acoustic guitars
- David Torkanowsky – Hammond B-3 organ, Fender Rhodes piano, Wurlitzer piano, Hohner D6 clavinet
- Cornell Williams – bass, background vocals
- Jeffrey "Jellybean" Alexander – drums
- Kirk Joseph – sousaphone
- Barney Floyd – trumpet, flugelhorn
- Jeff Albert – trombone
- Jeff Watkins – tenor saxophone
- Khari Allen Lee – alto saxophone
- Roger Lewis – baritone saxophone
- Charles "Chucky C" Elam III – background vocals
- Johnette Downing – background vocals
- Scott Billington – percussion
- Joe Bonamassa – guitar on "Me, Myself and I"
- Dave Alvin – guitar on "It's Your Move"
- Keb' Mo' – guitar on "Nighttime Gardener"

Production

- Produced by Scott Billington
- Recording, mixing: Steve Reynolds
- Assistant engineers: Nick Guttman, Matt Grondin
- Assistant engineer: Jake Eckert
- Mastering: Paul Blakemore
- Musical director: Vasti Jackson
- Horn arrangements: Jeff Albert
- Photography: Rick Olivier
- Art direction, cover, book backpage design: Carrie Smith
- Package Design: Jimmy Hole
- Thanks to Dave Clements and the Circle Bar
- Dave Alvin recorded by Craig Parker Adams at Winslow Ct. Studio, Los Angeles, CA. Session co-produced by Jeff DeLia
- Joe Bonamassa recorded by Angelo Caputo, assisted by Sean Madden, at NightBird Recording Studios, West Hollywood, CA
- Keb' Mo' recorded by Kevin R. Moore II aka P. Roosevelt at Treehouse, Los Angeles, CA
