= Koko Taylor =

American blues singer (1928–2009)

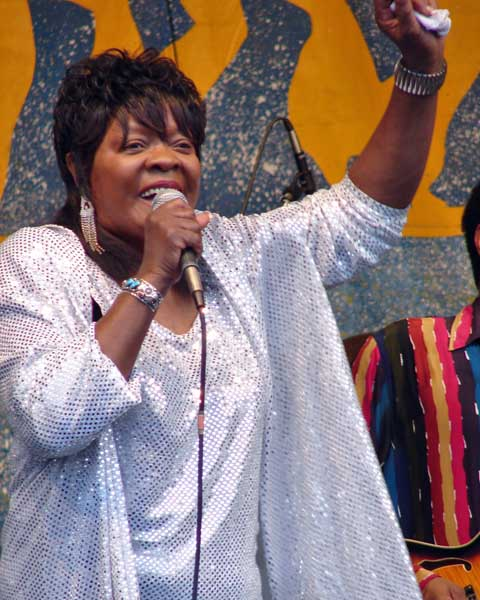
- Taylor at the New Orleans Jazz & Heritage Festival, 2006

Background information
- Also known as: KoKo
- Born: Cora Ann Walton; September 28, 1928; Memphis, Tennessee, U.S.
- Died: June 3, 2009 (aged 80) Chicago, Illinois, U.S.
- Genres: Chicago blues; electric blues; R&B; soul; soul blues; traditional blues
- Instrument: Vocals
- Years active: 1958–2009
- Labels: Alligator; MCA; Checker; Chess; Yambo; Charly
- Website: Official website

Koko Taylor (born Cora Ann Walton, September 28, 1928 – June 3, 2009) was an American singer whose style encompassed Chicago blues, electric blues, rhythm and blues, and soul blues. Sometimes called "The Queen of the Blues", she was known for her rough, powerful vocals. Over the course of her career, she was nominated for 11 Grammy Awards, winning 1985's Best Traditional Blues Album for her appearance on Blues Explosion.

== Life and career ==
Born on a farm near Memphis, Tennessee, Taylor was the daughter of a sharecropper. She left Tennessee for Chicago in 1952 with her husband, Robert "Pops" Taylor, a truck driver. In the late 1950s, she began singing in blues clubs in Chicago. She was spotted by Willie Dixon in 1962, and this led to more opportunities for performing and her first recordings. In 1963 she had a single on USA Records, and in 1964 a cut on a Chicago blues collection on Spivey Records, called Chicago Blues. In 1964 Dixon brought Taylor to Checker Records, a subsidiary label of Chess Records, for which she recorded "Wang Dang Doodle", a song written by Dixon and recorded by Howlin' Wolf five years earlier. The record became a hit, reaching number four on the R&B chart and number 58 on the pop chart in 1966, and selling a million copies. She recorded several versions of the song over the years, including a live rendition at the 1967 American Folk Blues Festival, with the harmonica player Little Walter and the guitarist Hound Dog Taylor. Her subsequent recordings, both original songs and covers, did not achieve as much success on the charts.

"Taylor sounds like you always wanted those women with Big in front of their names to sound—powerful, even rough, without ever altogether abandoning her rather feminine register."

— Christgau's Record Guide: Rock Albums of the Seventies (1981)

Taylor became better known by touring in the United States in the late 1960s and early 1970s, and she became accessible to a wider record-buying public when she signed a recording contract with Alligator Records in 1975. She recorded nine albums for Alligator, eight of which were nominated for Grammy awards, and came to dominate ranks of female blues singers, winning twenty-nine W. C. Handy/Blues Music Awards.

She survived a near-fatal car crash in 1989. In the 1990s, she appeared in the films Blues Brothers 2000 and Wild at Heart. She opened a blues club on Division Street in Chicago in 1994, which relocated to Wabash Avenue, in Chicago's South Loop, in 2000 (the club later closed).

In 2003, she appeared as a guest with Taj Mahal in an episode of the television series Arthur. In 2009, she performed with Umphrey's McGee at the band's New Year's Eve concert at the Auditorium Theater, in Chicago.

Bonnie Raitt, Shemekia Copeland, Janis Joplin, Shannon Curfman, and Susan Tedeschi cite Taylor as an influence on their styles.

In her later years, Taylor performed over 70 concerts a year and resided just south of Chicago, in Country Club Hills, Illinois.

Taylor's final performance was at the Blues Music Awards, on May 7, 2009. She suffered complications from surgery for gastrointestinal bleeding on May 19 and died on June 3. Taylor was survived by her daughter, two grandchildren, and three great-grandchildren.

== Legacy ==
In 2023, Taylor's 1960s performance of "Wang Dang Doodle" was added to the United States National Recording Registry.

A lengthy NPR profile, "The Sounds Of America: 'Wang Dang Doodle'", including singer Bonnie Raitt, actor Dan Aykroyd, and artist Shemekia Copeland aired in May 2023.

A Blues Music Award is given in the 'Koko Taylor Award (Traditional Blues Female)' category.

== Awards ==
- Grammy Award for Best Traditional Blues Album, 1985
- Howlin' Wolf Award, 1996
- Blues Hall of Fame, inducted 1997
- Blues Foundation Lifetime Achievement Award, 1999
- NEA National Heritage Fellowship, 2004
- Blues Music Award (formerly the W. C. Handy Award), 32 nominations with 29 wins in the following categories:
  - Entertainer of the Year (1985)
  - Female Artist (1981, 1995)
  - Song of the Year (2008)
  - Traditional Blues Album (2008)
  - Traditional Blues Female Artist (1992, 1993, 1999–2005, 2008, 2009)
  - Vocalist of the Year (1985)
- 7th Annual Independent Music Awards for Best Blues Album, 2008

== Discography ==
- "Love You Like a Woman", November 30, 1968 (Charly Records)
- Koko Taylor, 1969 (MCA/Chess Records)
- Basic Soul, 1972 (Chess)
- South Side Lady, 1973 (Black & Blue Records)
- I Got What It Takes, 1975 (Alligator Records)
- Southside Baby, 1975 (Black & Blue)
- The Earthshaker, 1978 (Alligator)
- From the Heart of a Woman, 1981 (Alligator)
- Queen of the Blues, 1985 (Alligator)
- Live from Chicago: An Audience with the Queen, 1987 (Alligator)
- Jump for Joy, 1990 (Alligator)
- Wang Dang Doodle, 1991 (Huub Records)
- Force of Nature, 1993 (Alligator)
- Royal Blue, 2000 (Alligator)
- Old School, 2007 (Alligator)

== See also ==
- Chicago Blues Festival
