= Revolution Come...Revolution Go =

Studio album by Gov't Mule
- Released: June 9, 2017
- Recorded: 2016–2017
- Length: 60:17
- Label: Fantasy Records
- Producer: Warren Haynes; Gordie Johnson; Don Was

Gov't Mule chronology
The Tel-Star Sessions (2016)	Revolution Come...Revolution Go (2017)	Bring On the Music: Live at the Capitol Theatre (2019)

Singles from Revolution Come...Revolution Go
- 1. "Sarah, Surrender" Released: July 19, 2017; 2. "Stone Cold Rage" Released: October 4, 2017; 3. "Dreams & Songs" Released: March 16, 2018

Revolution Come...Revolution Go is the eleventh studio album by Southern rock jam band Gov't Mule, released on June 9, 2017.

== Track listing ==
Revolution Come...Revolution Go track listing
No.	Title	Writer(s)	Length
1.	"Stone Cold Rage"	Warren Haynes, Danny Louis	6:00
2.	"Drawn That Way"	Warren Haynes	5:18
3.	"Pressure Under Fire"	Warren Haynes	5:23
4.	"The Man I Want to Be"	Warren Haynes, Matt Abts, Danny Louis, Jorgen Carlsson	6:21
5.	"Traveling Tune"	Warren Haynes	5:17
6.	"Thorns of Life"	Warren Haynes, Danny Louis, Jorgen Carlsson	8:48
7.	"Dreams & Songs"	Warren Haynes	6:37
8.	"Sarah, Surrender"	Warren Haynes	4:11
9.	"Revolution Come, Revolution Go"	Warren Haynes, Danny Louis, Jorgen Carlsson	8:03
10.	"Burning Point"	Warren Haynes	6:51
11.	"Easy Times"	Warren Haynes	6:58
12.	"Dark Was the Night, Cold Was the Ground"	Traditional; arranged by Warren Haynes	7:26
Total length:			77:13

Deluxe edition disc 2
No.	Title	Writer(s)	Length
1.	"What Fresh Hell"	Warren Haynes	5:47
2.	"Click-Track"	Warren Haynes	4:13
3.	"Outside Myself"	Warren Haynes	6:08
4.	"Revolution Come, Revolution Go" (alternate version)	Warren Haynes, Danny Louis, Jorgen Carlsson	8:03
5.	"The Man I Want to Be" (live in studio version)	Warren Haynes, Matt Abts, Danny Louis, Jorgen Carlsson	5:33
6.	"Dark Was the Night, Cold Was the Ground" (live in studio version)	Traditional; arranged by Warren Haynes	6:51
Total length:			36:35

== Personnel ==
=== Gov't Mule ===
- Warren Haynes – vocals, guitar
- Matt Abts – drums, percussion
- Danny Louis – keyboards, rhythm guitar, horns, backing vocals
- Jorgen Carlsson – bass

=== Additional personnel ===
- Gordie Johnson – steel guitar on "Traveling Tune"
- Rey Arteaga – percussion
- Sheree Smith – backing vocals
- Angela Miller – backing vocals
- Lauren Cervantez – backing vocals
- Alecia Chakour – backing vocals
- Jasmine Muhammad – backing vocals
- Bobby Allende – congas
- Jimmie Vaughan – guitar on "Burning Point"

== Charts ==
Chart performance for Revolution Come...Revolution Go
Chart (2017)	Peak position
Austrian Albums (Ö3 Austria)	44
Belgian Albums (Ultratop Flanders)	101
Belgian Albums (Ultratop Wallonia)	121
Dutch Albums (Album Top 100)	67
French Albums (SNEP)	165
German Albums (Offizielle Top 100)	20
Scottish Albums (OCC)	93
Swiss Albums (Schweizer Hitparade)	19
US Billboard 200	35
US Top Rock Albums (Billboard)	5
