= You Make Me Feel (Don Bryant album) =

Studio album by Don Bryant
- Released: June 19, 2020
- Length: 38:11
- Label: Fat Possum

Don Bryant chronology
Don't Give Up on Love (2017)	You Make Me Feel (2020)

Professional ratings
Aggregate scores
Source	Rating
Metacritic	83/100
Review scores
Source	Rating
AllMusic	4/5 stars
American Songwriter	4.5/5 stars
Mojo	4/5 stars
Uncut	7/10

You Make Me Feel is the third studio album by American rhythm and blues musician Don Bryant. It was released on June 19, 2020 under Fat Possum Records.

== Critical reception ==
You Make Me Feel was met with "universal acclaim" reviews from critics. At Metacritic, which assigns a weighted average rating out of 100 to reviews from mainstream publications, this release received an average score of 83, based on 7 reviews. Aggregator Album of the Year gave the album 80 out 100 based on a critical consensus of 5 reviews.

== Track listing ==
You Make Me Feel track listing
No.	Title	Length
1.	"Your Love is to Blame"	3:24
2.	"99 Pounds"	2:55
3.	"Is It Over"	4:30
4.	"I Die a Little Each Day"	2:51
5.	"Don't Turn Your Back on Me"	4:01
6.	"Your Love is Too Late"	3:55
7.	"I'll Go Crazy"	3:59
8.	"Cracked up over You"	3:12
9.	"A Woman's Touch"	5:14
10.	"Walk All over God's Heaven"	4:10

== Charts ==
Chart performance for You Make Me Feel
Chart (2020)	Peak position
UK Jazz & Blues Albums (OCC)	22
US Top Blues Albums (Billboard)	3
