= Don Bryant (songwriter) =

American singer-songwriter (1942–2025)

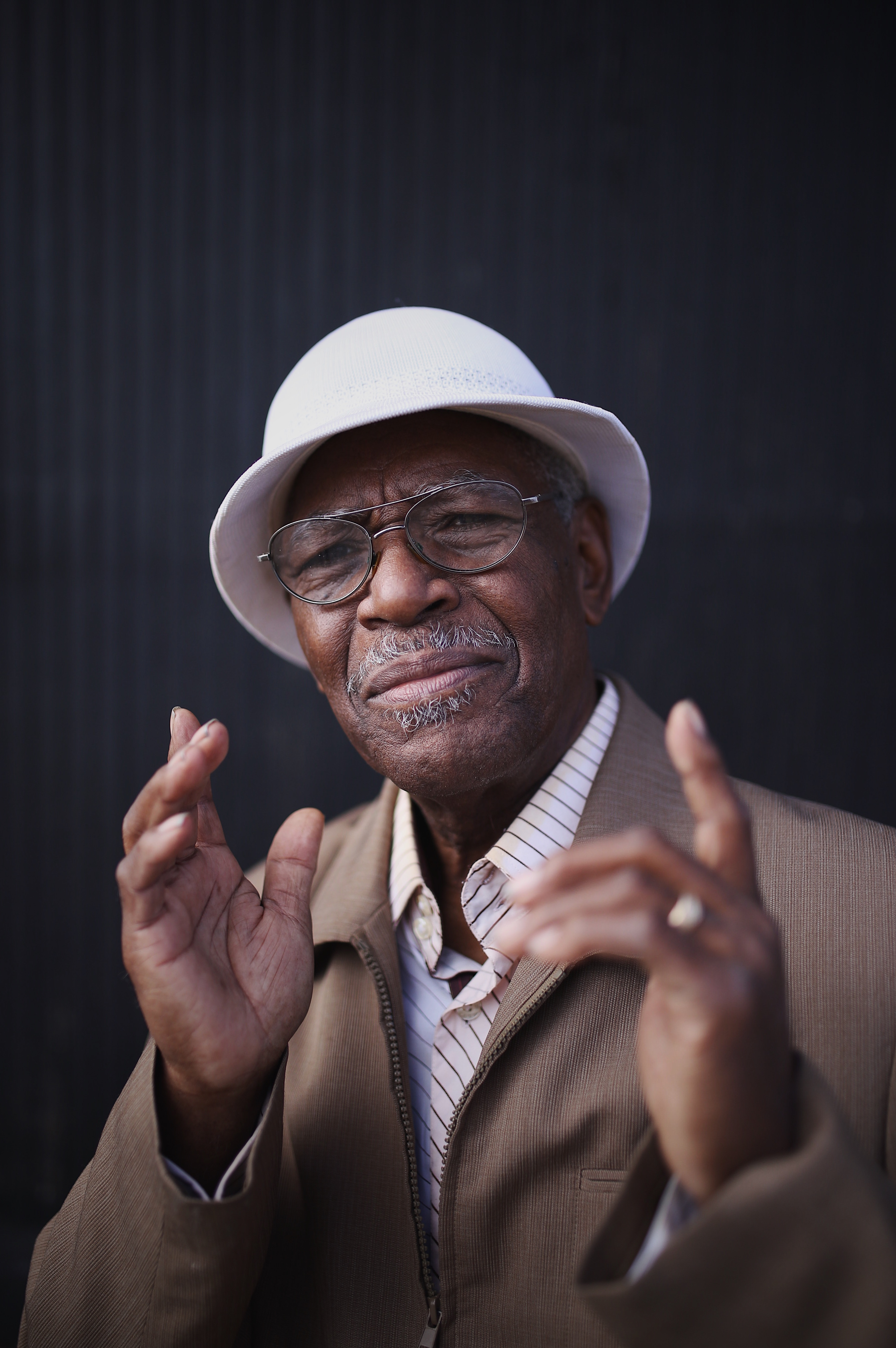
- Bryant in 2017

Background information
- Born: Donald Maurice Bryant; April 4, 1942; Memphis, Tennessee, U.S.
- Died: December 26, 2025 (aged 83)
- Occupations: Singer; songwriter
- Instrument: Vocals
- Labels: Hi; Fat Possum
- Spouse: Ann Peebles (m. 1974)

Donald Maurice Bryant (April 4, 1942 – December 26, 2025) was an American rhythm and blues singer and songwriter.

== Early life ==
Bryant was born in Memphis, Tennessee, United States, the fifth of ten children. He began singing in church at age five, and soon joined his father's family vocal group. He eventually formed a gospel quartet for a high school radio show, finding success singing secular pop songs on Dick "Cane" Cole's popular WLOK show. The quartet, performing as The Four Kings, would part with Cole to become the front band for Willie Mitchell, with Bryant as the lead singer.

== Hi Records ==
In 1960, the still teenage Bryant was offered a shot at songwriting, penning "I Got To Know" for The 5 Royales. He wrote material for other artists at Hi Records while continuing to record with The Four Kings and as a solo artist, resulting in a 1969 solo album. However, with the success of Al Green, Otis Clay, and other vocalists at Hi, Bryant's singing career took a backseat to writing, joining Earl Randle, Dan Greer, and Darryl Carter as Hi's top staff writers. Bryant is credited on as many as 154 titles.

By 1970, Willie Mitchell had begun to pair Bryant with his newest act, a young Ann Peebles, for whom he wrote "99 Pounds" and "Do I Need You". The pair co-wrote the Top 40 hit "I Can't Stand the Rain" in 1973, and were married the following year. Bryant spent much of the subsequent decade writing and opening for Peebles, with his final Hi single coming in 1981, a duet with his wife called "Mon Belle-Amour".

Bryant focused mainly on gospel albums throughout the 1980s and 1990s, and ultimately stopped performing altogether outside of church services.

== Return to performing ==
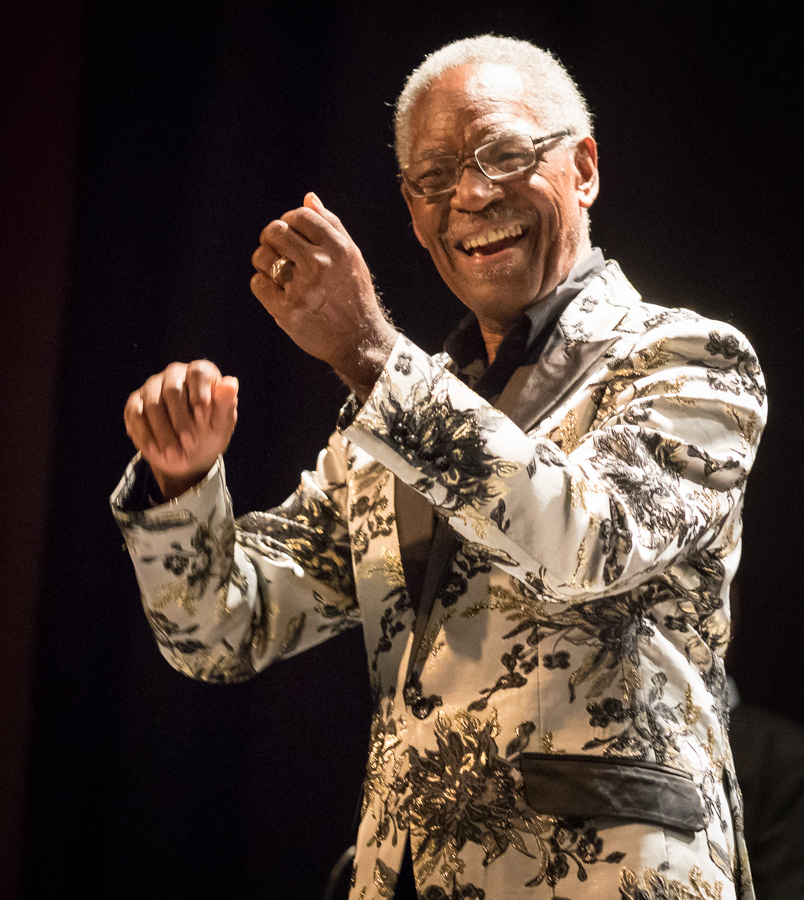
Bryant on stage in 2017

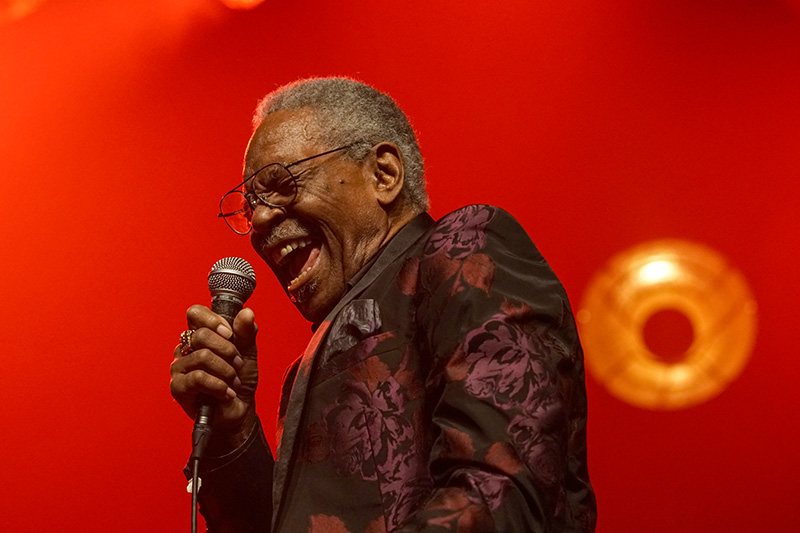
Bryant at Blues Heaven Festival, Denmark 2018

Following a conversation between producer Scott Bomar and former Hi Records drummer Howard Grimes, Bryant was invited to perform as a vocalist with Memphis-based soul homage outfit The Bo-Keys. After some convincing from Grimes, Bryant accepted and, within a few months, found the inspiration to return to the studio. Bryant and The Bo-Keys recorded Don't Give Up on Love in late 2016, which was released on the Fat Possum label in 2017. The album featured an array of Bryant's past triumphs as well as new material. In 2020, Bryant and the Bo-Keys collaborated again on the Fat Possum Records release You Make Me Feel which was nominated for a Grammy Award.

== Death ==
Bryant died on December 26, 2025, at the age of 83.

== Discography ==
- Precious Soul (Hi Records), 1969
- Don't Give Up on Love (Fat Possum Records), 2017
- You Make Me Feel (Fat Possum Records), 2020
- "A World Like That" (single) (Fat Possum Records), 2021

=== As Donald Bryant and a Chosen Few ===
- What Do You Think About Jesus? (By Faith Records), 1987
- I'm Gonna Praise Him (By Faith Records), 1989
- It's All in the Word (By Faith Records), 2000
