= Mississippi Musicians Hall of Fame =

Coordinates: 32.408260°N 90.124186°W

The Mississippi Musicians Hall of Fame, headquartered in Clinton, Mississippi, honors Mississippi's famous musicians. It is a "Who's Who" of the blues, rock and roll, and jazz from their beginnings to present day. The organization's museum is located in the Jackson–Evers International Airport in Jackson, Mississippi.

== Inductees ==
=== Blues ===
- Willie Dixon - Vicksburg, MS
- David "Honeyboy" Edwards - Shaw, MS
- Mississippi John Hurt - Teoc, MS
- Vasti Jackson - McComb, MS
- Elmore James - Richland, MS
- Robert Johnson - Hazlehurst, MS
- Tommy Johnson - Terry, MS
- B.B. King - Itta Bena, MS
- Charlie Musselwhite - Kosciusko, MS
- Charlie Patton - Edwards, MS
- Pinetop Perkins - Belzoni, MS
- Hubert Sumlin - Greenwood, MS
- Muddy Waters - Rolling Fork, MS
- Joseph Lee "Big Joe" Williams - Crawford, MS
- Sonny Boy Williamson II - Glendora, MS
- Howlin Wolf - White Station, MS

=== Classical ===
- John Alexander - Meridian, MS
- Milton Bryon Babbitt - Jackson, MS
- William Brown - Jackson, MS
- Ruby Pearl Elzy - Pontotoc, MS
- Elizabeth Taylor Greenfield - Natchez, MS
- Samuel Jones - Inverness, MS
- Willard Palmer - McComb, MS
- Leontyne Price - Laurel, MS
- Steve Rouse - Moss Point, MS
- James Sclater - Clinton, MS
- William Grant Still - Woodville, MS
- Walter Turnbull - Greenville, MS

=== Country ===
- Hank Cochran - Greenville, MS
- Charles Feathers - Holly Springs, MS
- Bobbie Gentry - Chickasaw County, MS
- Mickey Gilley - Natchez, MS
- Faith Hill - Ridgeland, MS
- Carl Jackson - Louisville, MS
- Fred Knoblock - Jackson, MS
- O. B. McCinton - Senatobia, MS
- Elsie McWilliams - Meridian, MS
- Ben Peters - Greenville, MS
- Charley Pride - Sledge, MS
- LeAnn Rimes - Pearl, MS
- Jimmie Rodgers - Meridian, MS
- Mississippi Sheiks - Bolton, MS
- Conway Twitty - Friars Point, MS
- Tammy Wynette - Tremont, MS

=== Gospel and religious ===
- James Blackwood/The Blackwood Brothers - Ackerman, MS
- Blind Boys of Mississippi - Piney Woods School
- Canton Spirituals - Canton, MS
- C. L. Franklin - Sunflower County, MS
- Mississippi Mass Choir/Frank D. Williams - Jackson, MS
- James Owens - Clarksdale, MS
- Pilgrim Jubilees - Houston, MS
- Rev. Cleophus Robinson, Canton, MS
- Jackson Southernaires - Jackson, MS
- Pop Staples/Staples Singers - Winona, MS
- Southern Sons - Delta, MS
- Williams Brothers - Smithdale, MS

=== Jazz ===
- Mose Allison - Tallahatchie County, MS
- Teddy Edwards - Jackson, MS
- William Fielder - Meridian, MS
- Dardanelle Hadley - Avalon, MS
- Milt Hinton - Vicksburg, MS
- International Sweethearts of Rhythm - Piney Woods School
- Hank Jones - Vicksburg, MS
- Jimmie Lunceford - Fulton, MS
- Tom Malone - Sumrall, MS
- Brew Moore - Indianola, MS
- Dalton Smith - Jackson, MS
- Freddie Waits - Jackson, MS
- Cassandra Wilson - Jackson, MS
- Gerald Stanley Wilson - Shelby, MS
- Lester Young - Woodville, MS

=== Multi-talented ===
- Marty Stuart - Philadelphia, MS

=== Popular music ===
- Lance Bass - Laurel/Clinton, MS
- Keith Carlock - Clinton, MS
- Paul Davis - Meridian, MS
- Guy Hovis - Tupelo, MS
- Van Dyke Parks - Hattiesburg, MS
- Nanette Workman - Jackson, MS

=== Production/recording/promotion ===
- Blackberry Records - Summit, MS
- Delta Records/Jimmie Ammons - Jackson, MS
- Marty Gamblin - Philadelphia, MS
- Malaco Records - Jackson, MS
- Willard and Lillian McMurry - Jackson, MS
- Peavey Electronics/Hartley Peavey - Meridian, MS
- H. C. Speir - Jackson, MS
- Johnny Vincent (John Imbragulio) - Laurel, MS
- Benjamin Wright - Greenville, MS
- Jim Dickinson - Little Rock, MS

=== Rap ===
- David Banner - Jackson, MS
- Nate Dogg - Clarksdale, Ms
- Big K.R.I.T - Meridian, MS
- BigDru - Richton/Mclain, MS

=== Rhythm and blues ===
- Prentiss Barnes - Maglolia, MS
- Jerry Butler - Sunflower County, MS
- Joe Campbell - Greenville, MS
- Little Milton Campbell - Inverness, MS
- Sam Cooke - Clarksdale, MS
- Tyrone Davis - Greenwood, MS
- Bo Diddley - McComb, MS
- John Lee Hooker - Clarksdale, MS
- Dorothy Moore - Jackson, MS
- Junior Parker - Clarksdale, MS
- Jimmy Reed - Dunleith, MS
- David Ruffin - Meridian, MS
- Bobby Rush - Jackson, MS
- Rufus Thomas - Cayce, MS

=== Rock and roll ===
- Andy Anderson and the Rolling Stones - Clarksdale, MS,
- Jackie Brenston - Clarksdale, MS
- Delaney Bramlett - Pontotoc, MS
- Jimmy Buffett - Pascagoula, MS
- Ace Cannon - Grenada, MS
- Steve Forbert - Meridian, MS
- Blind Roosevelt Graves and the Mississippi Jook Band, Hattiesburg, MS
- Jerry Lee Lewis - Nesbit, MS
- Elvis Presley - Tupelo, MS
- Warren Smith - Louise, MS
- Greg "Fingers" Taylor - Terry, MS
- Ike Turner - Clarksdale, MS
- Webb Wilder - Hattiesburg, MS
- Mary Wilson - Greenville, MS

=== Theater/Broadway/movie ===
- Glen Ballard - Natchez, MS
- Dee Barton - Houston/Starkville, MS
- Olu Dara - Natchez, MS
- Lehman Engel - Jackson, MS
- Eddie Hodges - Hattiesburg, MS
- Mundell Lowe - Laurel, MS
- Mary Ann Mobley - Brandon, MS
- Lloyd Wells - Laurel, MS

=== Songwriting ===
- William Alexander Attaway - Greesville, MS
- Mac McAnally - Belmont, MS
- Clyde Otis - Prentiss, MS
- Paul Overstreet - Van Cleave, MS
- Tommy Tate - Jackson, MS
- Jim Weatherly - Pontotoc, MS
- Craig Wiseman - Hattiesburg, MS

=== Special ===
- Bob Pittman - Brookhaven, MS
- Gayle Dean Wardlow - Meridian, MS
- Skeets McWilliams - Jackson, MS

== See also ==
- List of music museums
