= Bobby Rush (musician) =

American singer-songwriter

- Born: Emmett Ellis Jr. November 10, 1933 (age 93); Homer, Louisiana, United States
- Origin: Pine Bluff, Arkansas, United States
- Genres: Blues, electric blues, soul, R&B, funk, disco, acoustic blues, soul-blues
- Occupations: Singer, songwriter, record producer
- Instruments: Vocals, guitar, harmonica
- Years active: 1951–present
- Label: Various

Bobby Rush (born Emmett Ellis Jr. in Homer, Louisiana on November 10, 1933) is an American blues musician, composer, record producer, and singer. His style incorporates elements of blues, rap, and funk, as well as a comic sense about blues tropes.

Rush has won twelve Blues Music Awards and in 2017, at the age of 83, he won his first Grammy Award for the album Porcupine Meat. He is inducted into the Blues Hall of Fame, Mississippi Musicians Hall of Fame, and Rhythm & Blues Music Hall of Fame.

== Life and career ==
Rush is the son of Emmett and Mattie Ellis. He was the sixth of ten children. His father was a pastor whose guitar and harmonica playing provided early musical influences. As a young child he began experimenting with music using a sugarcane syrup bucket and a broom-wire diddley bow. Around 1947, he and the family moved to Pine Bluff, Arkansas, where his father took on the pastorate of a church and was a farmer.

It was here that Rush would become friends with Elmore James, the slide player Boyd Gilmore (James's cousin), and the piano player Johnny "Big Moose" Walker; eventually forming a band to support his singing and harmonica and guitar playing. His band, Bobby Rush and the Four Jivers, consisted of Gilmore, Walker, Pinetop Perkins, and Robert Plunkett. Through Gilmore, Rush became friends with Clarksdale musician Ike Turner.

Still a teen, Rush donned a fake moustache to play in local juke joints with the band, fascinated by enthusiasm of the crowds. His family relocated to Chicago in 1953, where he became part of the local blues scene in the following decade. In Chicago, he met and befriended Little Walter and Muddy Waters who lived nearby. Little Walter got him a job at a club called Skins where they played behind a curtain for a white audience, and began working for Jimmy Reed. Through these connections he began performing on a circuit with Etta James, Howlin' Wolf, Muddy Waters, and Jimmy Reed.

In the early 1970s a song he wrote, "Chicken Heads", released by Galaxy, became his breakout record after being picked up from a small label started by the former Vee Jay Records producer Calvin Carter. It reached No. 34 the Billboard R&B chart in 1971. "Chicken Heads" would become Rush's first certified gold certified record in 1971, and would later re-enter the Billboard chart 30 years after its release as a result of being featured in the film Black Snake Moan.

Rush later recorded with a leading label for black music, Philadelphia International, releasing his first album, Rush Hour, produced by Leon Huff, with one track, "I Wanna Do the Do," reaching No. 75 on the Billboard R&B chart in 1979. Reviewing Rush Hour in Christgau's Record Guide: Rock Albums of the Seventies (1981), Robert Christgau wrote: "A lot of this is fun—I'm delighted to find Leon Huff collaborating with someone who's got funk in his soul, and heartened to hear a protest song about the problem of lost keys. But a lot of it—the witless 'Evil Is,' the characterless 'Hey, Western Union Man'—is dumber than Kenny Gamble."

His next albums to become gold certified would be Sue in 1981 and Ain't Studdin' Ya in 1991.

After Living in Chicago for 48 years, Rush moved to Jackson, Mississippi, to find the roots of his enslaved ancestors.

He recorded a series of records for the LaJam label, Malaco's Waldoxy imprint, and in 2003, his own Deep Rush label with co-founder Greg Preston, a former Malaco Records executive. One of the artists on the label is Crystal Springs, Mississippi native and former bandmate Dexter Allen.

He appeared in the 2003 documentary The Road to Memphis which is part of the series The Blues, produced by Martin Scorsese. As a result of the Scorsese film, Rolling Stone magazine named him "'King of the Chitlin' Circuit' because of his 50 years of relentless touring and colorful live shows."

His 2004 album FolkFunk was a return to a more rootsier sound, featuring guitarist Alvin Youngblood Hart, and was co-produced by Preston who was awarded producer of the year by Living Blues magazine for his work on the record. That year he was a judge for the second annual Independent Music Awards to support independent artists' careers. He also performed at the White House along with James Brown when Bill Clinton went into office. In 2014 he again performed for Bill and Hillary Clinton for a state event in Arkansas.

In 2007, he became the first blues artist to perform in China, earning him the title “International Dean of the Blues.” He was later named Friendship Ambassador to the Great Wall of China after performing the largest concert ever held at that site. In addition, Rush has toured in most major markets around the world, including Sydney, Australia; Paris, France; Tokyo, Japan; Shanghai, China; Johannesburg, South Africa; Berlin, Germany; Rome, Italy; Barcelona, Spain; Lucerne, Switzerland; New York, New York; Chicago, Illinois; Memphis, Tennessee; Los Angeles, California; to Jackson, Mississippi.

In 2014, Rush's album Down in Louisiana, was Grammy-nominated for "Best Blues Album", and won a Blues Music Award in the 'Soul Blues Album of the Year' category, whilst Rush was also nominated in two other categories. Following 2014's Grammy nomination, Rush was nominated again for "Best Blues Album" in 2015 for Decisions, with Blinddog Smokin' and featuring Rock n' Roll Hall of Famer Dr. John.

In July 2014, Rush performed with Dan Aykroyd one of James Brown's songs on The Tonight Show Starring Jimmy Fallon.

He appears in the 2015 documentary film I Am the Blues. He also appeared as himself performing "I Ain't Studdin' You" in the 2019 film Dolemite Is My Name.

Rush also made contributions to the 2025 feature film Sinners, performing the harmonica parts for the character of Delta Slim. Most notably in the song "Juke", a duet with Miles Caton's character Sammie.

== Awards and recognition ==
Rush received recognition for his music after the release of his 22nd album, Rush, when he was awarded "Best Male Soul Blues Artist" at the Blues Music Awards. He also received "best acoustic artist" and "best acoustic album" for his album Raw.

In 2006, Rush was inducted into the Blues Hall of Fame.

In 2008, Rush was honored with a marker on the Mississippi Blues Trail in Jackson, Mississippi.

In 2012, Rush was inducted into the Mississippi Musicians Hall of Fame.

In May 2015, Rush cut the ribbon for the Blues Hall of Fame, with an introduction by the Memphis Head of Tourism and aired live on local news.

In 2015, Rush won two Blues Music Awards: 'Soul Blues Male Artist' and 'B.B. King Entertainer of the Year'.

In May 2019, Rush was awarded an Honorary Doctorate of Humanities by Rhodes College. As part of the graduation ceremony, the worldwide premiere of his blues rendition of "America the Beautiful" occurred. This video was recorded at Royal Studios with Eddie Cotton and Rhodes College's students from the Mike Curb for Music Institute.

In 2015, Rush was inducted into the Rhythm & Blues Music Hall of Fame.

In 2017, Rush won a Blues Music Award for Album of the Year for "Porcupine Meat" and for Historical Album of the Year for Chicken Heads: A 50-Year History of Bobby Rush. These were the eleventh and twelfth Blues Music Awards Rush has been awarded by the Blues Foundation during his career. He gained his 13th Blues Music Award in 2020, this time in the 'Soul Blues Album of the Year' category for Sitting on Top of the Blues.

=== Grammy Awards ===
In 2017, at the age of 83, Rush won his first Grammy Award in the category Best Traditional Blues Album for Porcupine Meat. In 2018, a remix of Rush's song "Funk O'De Funk" by American electronic music duo Smle was nominated for Best Remixed Recording at the 60th Grammy Awards. The rendition lost to Latroit's remix of Depeche Mode's "You Move".

Year	Nominee / work	Award	Result
2001	Hoochie Man	Best Contemporary Blues Album	Nominated
2014	Down In Louisiana	Best Blues Album	Nominated
2015	Decisions	Best Blues Album	Nominated
2017	Porcupine Meat	Best Traditional Blues Album	Won
2020	Sitting on Top of the Blues	Best Traditional Blues Album	Nominated
2021	Rawer than Raw	Best Traditional Blues Album	Won
2024	All My Love for You	Best Traditional Blues Album	Won

== Discography ==
=== Albums (LP) ===
- 1979 Rush Hour (Philadelphia International)
- 1981 Sue (LaJam)
- 1983 Wearing It Out (LaJam)
- 1984 Gotta Have Money (LaJam)
- 1985 What's Good for the Goose Is Good for the Gander (LaJam)
- 1988 A Man Can Give It (But He Can’t Take It) (LaJam)

=== Albums (CD) ===
- 1983 Making a Decision (LaJam)
- 1990 Man Can Give It but He Can't Take It (La Jam)
- 1991 I Ain't Studdin' You (Urgent)
- 1992 Handy Man (Urgent)
- 1995 One Monkey Don't Stop No Show (Waldoxy)
- 1996 Wearing It Out (La Jam)
- 1997 It's Alright, Vol. 2
- 1997 Lovin' a Big Fat Woman (Waldoxy)
- 1999 Rush Hour... Plus (Philadelphia Intl)
- 1999 The Best of Bobby Rush (La Jam)
- 2000 Hoochie Man (Waldoxy)
- 2003 Undercover Lover (Deep Rush)
- 2003 Live at Ground Zero DVD + CD (Deep Rush)
- 2004 Folkfunk (Deep Rush)
- 2005 Night Fishin (Deep Rush)
- 2006 Essential Recordings, Volume 1 (Deep Rush)
- 2006 Essential Recordings, Volume 2 (Deep Rush)
- 2007 Raw (Deep Rush)
- 2008 Look at What You Gettin' (Deep Rush)
- 2009 Blind Snake (Deep Rush)
- 2011 Show You a Good Time (Deep Rush)
- 2013 Down in Louisiana (Thirty Tigers)
- 2014 Decisions (Silver Talon Records)
- 2016 Porcupine Meat (Rounder Records)
- 2019 Sitting on Top of the Blues (Deep Rush)
- 2020 Rawer than Raw (Deep Rush)
- 2023 All My Love for You (Deep Rush)

=== Singles (selected) ===
- 1964 "Someday" (Jerry-O)
- 1967 "Sock Boo Ga Loo" / "Much Too Much" (Checker)
- 1968 "Camel Walk" / "Gotta Have Money" (ABC)
- 1969 "Wake Up" / "The Things That I Used to Do" (Salem)
- 1970 "Let It All Hang Out" / "Just Be Yourself/What Now" (Salem)
- 1971 "Chicken Heads" / "Mary Jane" (Galaxy)
- 1972 "Niki Hoeky" / "I Don’t Know" (Jewel)
- 1972 "Gotta Be Funky" / "Gotta Find You Girl" (On Top)
- 1974 "Get It On with Me" / "It’s Alright" (Jewel)
- 1974 "Get Out of Here Part 1" (Warner Bros.)
- 1976 "I’m Still Waiting" / "She Put the Whammy on Me" (London)
- 1979 "I Wanna Do the Do" (Philadelphia International)
- 1979 "Let’s Do It Together" (Philadelphia International)
- 1983 "Sue" (LaJam)
- 1988 "A Man Can Give It (But He Can’t Take It)" (LaJam)
- 1991 "I Ain't Studdin' You" (Urgent)
- 1992 "I’m Gone" (Urgent)
- 1992 "Time to Hit the Road Again" (Urgent)
- 1992 "You, You, You (Know What to Do)" (Urgent)
- 1995 "She's a Good 'Un (It's Alright)"
- 1996 "Too Late, I’m Gone" (Waldoxy)
- 1997 "Booga Bear" (Waldoxy)

== See also ==
- Chicago Blues Festival
