= Mark van Allen =

American musician

- Born: 1954 (age 71–72); Worcester, Massachusetts, USA
- Occupations: Musician, recording engineer, record producer
- Instruments: Pedal steel, dobro, lap steel, electric and acoustic guitar, bass guitar, mandolin
- Years active: 1979–present
- Website: markvanallen.com

Mark van Allen (born 1954) is an American musician, recording engineer and record producer, born in Worcester, Massachusetts, United States. Instruments he plays include the pedal steel guitar, dobro, lap steel guitar, electric and acoustic guitar, bass guitar, and the mandolin.

As a touring and session musician, van Allen has appeared with a wide variety of artists, covering many musical genres, including Zac Brown Band, Shawn Mullins, Buddy Miles, Hank Thompson, Indigo Girls, John Berry, Mark Wills, Warren Haynes, Sugarland, Jimmy Herring, Leftover Salmon, Guy Clark, Vassar Clements, Rehab and Manchester Orchestra.

He currently resides in Atlanta, Georgia, where he runs a multitrack recording studio and is active on the local recording and national touring scene.

== Discography ==
Year	Song/Album	Artist	Label	Instrument	Other credits	Ref
1979	"A Song About A Letter" b/w "I Love You" (45 RPM single)	Merlin Jones	Frontier Records	Pedal steel		
1980	"Memories of You" b/w "Someone Cares" (45 RPM single)	Randy Roddy	Frontier Records	Pedal steel		
1986	Things Are Not The Same (LP)	John Berry	Clear Sky Records	Pedal steel		
1988	"Between 17 And 20" b/w " The Christmas Tree" (45 RPM single)	Kyle Ensley		Pedal steel		
1993	The Willing Suspension Of Disbelief	DeDe Vogt	Daemon Records	Pedal steel		
1994	Everyday Thing	Alan Wayne Baker	Rogue Records	Pedal steel		
1994	Things Are Not The Same (CD)	John Berry	Liberty Records/Patriot Records	Pedal steel		
1994	Rain	Jan Smith	Rogue Records	Pedal steel	Songwriter	
1995	Simple Life	Christopher Mercure	RamCat	Pedal steel		
1996	She Dreams Alone	Libby Eason	Dark Rose Records	Pedal steel, dobro, lead guitar		
1996	John Grant	John Grant	RCR Records	Pedal steel, dobro, lead guitar		
1996	Horses And Guitars	Selene McCarthy	Mane N' Tale	Pedal steel, dobro, lead guitar		
1997	Real Cowboy Girl	Cowboy Envy	NikiVicki	Pedal steel		
1997	Move Along	Thornton Price	TP10	Pedal steel		
1997	Open the Window	Elise Witt	EmWorld Records	Pedal steel		
1999	Barnyard Gone Wrong	Blueground Undergrass	Root Cellar Records	Pedal steel, harmony vocals	Recording and mixdown engineer, co-producer	
1999	Live at Southside Music Hall	Blueground Undergrass	HaneyJones Music	Pedal steel		
1999	Live At The Variety Playhouse	Blueground Undergrass	Phoenix Records	Pedal steel, lap steel	Mixdown engineer, co-producer	
1999	Live At The Variety Playhouse (European vinyl release)	Blueground Undergrass	Comet Records/Horizon Records	Pedal steel, lap steel	Mixdown engineer, co-producer	
1999	Live at Iota	Blueground Undergrass		Pedal steel, lap steel		
1999	Live At The Variety Halloween	Blueground Undergrass		Pedal steel, lap steel		
1999	Prompt Temporary Relief	Good Medicine	Root Cellar Records	Pedal steel		
1999	Just For The Songs	Rich Healy	Up and Running Records	Pedal steel, dobro, electric guitar		
1999	Souldiers	Richard Long		Pedal steel	Recording engineer, producer	
2000	Blueground Undergrass	Newground	Bgug Records	Pedal steel, dobro, lap steel, lead and harmony vocals	Recording and mixdown engineer, mastering engineer, producer	
2000	Blueground Undergrass	Phoenix Presents Sampler	Phoenix Records	Pedal steel	Mixdown engineer	
2000	Windows Sampler	Blueground Undergrass, Play J.Com	Windows Records	Pedal steel		
2000	Whatever Became Of Me?	Joyce Brookshire	EmWorld Records	Pedal steel, dobro		
2000	Wagons Ho	Cowboy Envy	Daemon Records	Pedal steel		
2000	Lost My Steel Railways	Danny Kahn		Pedal steel, dobro, electric guitar		
2000	Fresh Flowers	Selene McCarthy	Mane N' Tale	Pedal steel, dobro, lead guitar		
2000	One Horse Town	Queenie Mullinix		Pedal steel, dobro, electric guitar	Recording engineer	
2000	Oldstar	Oldstar	Riverbridge Records	Pedal steel		
2000	Dream	Karen Shayne	Rogue Records	Pedal steel		
2001	The Discussion Begins...	Dan K. Theory	Root Cellar Records	Lap steel, dobro	Recording and mixdown engineer	
2001	Lollipop Rock	Lollipop Rock		Pedal steel		
2001	Live	Music Badger.Com		Pedal steel		
2001	Cosmic Cabin Memories	Jim Thompson		Pedal steel, acoustic and electric guitar, dobro, mandolin, bass, baritone guitar	Recording and mixdown engineer, producer	
2001	Watch and Learn Let's Jam: Country and Bluegrass		Cassette and Video Learning Systems	Pedal steel		
2001	Dusk	Dusk Wilson Weaver	Phi Acoustics	Pedal steel, dobro, electric guitar		
2002	Heartland	Athma Mitram			Recording engineer	
2002	The Road From Swannanoa	Border Collies			Recording engineer	
2002	Moodswing Halo	Shane Bridges	Riverbridge Records	Pedal steel, dobro	Recording and mixdown engineer, producer	
2002	On Board The Armenia	Calliope Fair	Root Cellar Records	Pedal steel, dobro	Recording and mixdown engineer	
2002	Knee Deep In Blues	Del Conner	DellConn	Pedal steel		
2002	Just Being Me	Nichole Davidson		Pedal steel		
2002	Imperfectly	Libby Eason	Dark Rose Records	Dobro		
2002	Not Too Late To Love Again	Wayne Hill	Forte Music	Pedal steel		
2002	Let It Unfold	Sheri Kling	Heartsprings Music	Pedal steel, dobro		
2002	This Guy's The Limit	Rich Millett	Pop Head Music	Pedal steel		
2002	Lifelines	Paul Sforza	Turnstone Records	Pedal steel		
2002	The Treehouse Incident	Shadowood	Shady Music	Pedal steel		
2002	Enjoy The Ride	Shadowood	Rogue Records	Pedal steel		
2003	Nowhere Is Too Far	Jon Allmet	Between The Sheets Music	Pedal steel		
2003	Dance Around It	Box Rockers		Pedal steel, dobro, lap steel	Recording and mixdown engineer, co-producer	
2003	With Shawn Mullins	Cornbread		Pedal steel		
2003	Free To Go	Donna Hopkins		Dobro	Recording engineer	
2003	HomeWrecker, HeartBreaker	Kate and The Retreads		Pedal steel		
2003	Homewrecker, Heartbreaker	Kate James and Lost Country	Hayden's Ferry	Pedal steel		
2003	Chaff Harvest	Packway Handle Band	Busboat		Recording engineer	
2003	Collage	Bill Shultz		Pedal steel, dobro, electric guitar	Recording and mixdown engineer	
2003	Happy Holidays From 99X, Vol. III	Sugarland				
2004	Live at Tree Sound Studios	Caroline Aiken		Pedal steel		
2004	Three Rivers Point	Captain Soularcat		Pedal steel		
2004	In The Beginning	Emmaus Road Project		Pedal steel		
2004	All That We Let In	Indigo Girls	Sony/Epic	Pedal steel, dobro		
2004	Drum & Bass Society, Vol. 1	Joseph Patrick Moore	Blue Canoe Records	Pedal steel		
2004	Crush	The Planet Riders		Pedal steel, dobro, electric guitar, baritone guitar	Recording and mixdown engineer	
2004	Live At Eddie's Attic 3-24-04	The Planet Riders		Pedal steel, dobro	Bad jokes	
2004	County Line	Mark Scott	U.S. 78 Music	Pedal steel		
2004	Premium Quality Tunes	Sugarland	Mercury Nashville	Pedal steel		
2004	Grey	Wayside Riders		Pedal steel		
2005	Why Not?	The Bird Dogs		Pedal steel, dobro, harmony vocals	Producer, engineer	
2005	Clay Cook	Clay Cook		Pedal steel		
2005	Sideman Blues	Bret Hartley Experiment	Tremolo Blue Music	Pedal steel		
2005	Heartland	Sheri Kling	Heartsprings Music	Pedal steel, dobro		
2005	Man Made Trouble	Nathan Mayberry		Pedal steel, baritone guitar	Recording engineer	
2005	Live at Eddie's Attic	Nathan Mayberry		Pedal steel		
2005	[R]Evolution	Moonshine Still	Tree Sound	Pedal steel		
2005	Hey Buddy	New Orlean's Juice		Pedal steel		
2005	Language Of Dreams	Berne Poliakoff		Pedal steel		
2005	For the Kids	Ranger Bill		Pedal steel, dobro, guitar, bass, keyboard, baritone guitar	Producer, engineer	
2005	Home Grown	Zac Brown Band	Home Grown Records	Pedal steel		
2006	The Memory of Your Company	Arlington Priest	Crazy Neighbor Records	Pedal steel, dobro		
2006	Once In A Blue Moon	Larry Scott Chapman	Shane Records	Pedal steel, dobro		
2006	Songs From Stone Mountain	Dave Daniels & New Pony		Pedal steel	Recording and mixdown engineer, co-producer	
2006	Streetcars Ain't Got Handlebars	Russ Duty		Pedal steel		
2006	Guns Kill People	Mike Killeen		Pedal steel, dobro	Recording engineer, co-producer	
2006	Demos, Outtakes, Live and Whatnot	Mike Killeen		Pedal steel, dobro	Recording, mixing, and mastering engineer, co-producer	
2006	Wandering Moon	Kristin Markiton Band		Pedal steel, dobro		
2006	Live at Eddie's Attic Sept. 13, 2006	Kristin Markiton Band		Dobro		
2006	T.B.S. Soundstage (DVD)	Kristin Markiton Band		Pedal steel, dobro		
2006	Myth of the Self Made Man	Nathan Mayberry		Pedal steel, dobro	Recording engineer	
2006	Cory Sellers	Cory Sellers		Pedal steel, dobro		
2006	Two Lane Road	South 70		Pedal steel, dobro		
2006	Crazy	Pete Whitfield		Pedal steel, dobro		
2007	Courier	Brian Ashley Jones Trio		Dobro	Recording and mixdown engineer, co-producer	
2007	That Should Heal Nicely	Bishop Don		Pedal steel		
2007	Broken Window Pains	Shane Bridges	Riverbridge Records	Pedal steel		
2007	Gathering Of Eagles	Dwain Cleveland		Electric guitar, acoustic guitar, classical guitar, pedal steel, bass	Recording and mixdown engineer, producer	
2007		Kahle Davis and the Night Watchmen		Pedal steel, dobro	Recording and mixdown engineer, co-producer	
2007	Highway to Fame (television special)	Tom Dugger		Pedal steel, dobro		
2007		Owen Evans		Pedal steel, dobro, lap steel		
2007		Kecia Garland		Pedal steel, dobro	Recording and mixdown engineer, producer	
2007	Jackson County Line	Jackson County Line		Pedal steel		
2007	Hell Broke Loose in Georgia	Moira Nelligan		Bass, pedal steel	Recording and mixdown engineer	
2007	Whiskey Down	Tyler Reeve		Pedal steel, dobro, lap steel		
2007	Hard Headed Fool	Corey Smith	Razor & Tie	Pedal steel, dobro		
2007	America	Robin Dean Salmon		Pedal steel, dobro		
2007	Slowly First	James Salter		Pedal steel		
2007		Tanglewood Tonic			Recording and mixdown engineer	
2007		Wighat			Mixdown engineer	
2007	Crazy Heart	Tom Wolf		Dobro	Bad jokes	
2007	We Know What You Want	Zydeco T			Recording and mixdown engineer, co-producer	
2008	90 Proof Lullabye	Connor Christian & Southern Gothic		Pedal steel, lap steel		
2008	God Sent An Angel	Laveda Dorsey		Pedal steel, dobro		
2008	CD single	Steve Freeman		Pedal steel		
2008	Clear Channel Jingle	Simon Horrocks		Pedal steel		
2008	Little. And Low.	Mike Killeen	227 Springdale Records	Pedal steel, lap steel	Recording and mixdown engineer	
2008	Sugar On A Stick	Rebecca Loebe		Pedal steel		
2008	CD single	Kristin Markiton		Pedal steel		
2008	Mending	The New Frontiers	The Militia Group	Pedal steel		
2008	She Says	J. R. Rund		Dobro		
2008	South 70	South 70	DrumBum Music	Pedal steel, lap steel		
2009	Naked	Steve Baskin		Pedal steel		
2009	I Really Want to Say	Adam Bret		Pedal steel		
2009	Clementine	Dave Daniels	Black Hills Music	Pedal steel	Recording engineer	
2009	Just Like Ghosts	Dave Daniels & the PTA		Pedal steel	Recording engineer, production	
2009	Mystery Prize	Rebecca Loebe		Pedal steel, dobro		
2009		Nate Montgomery		Pedal steel, dobro, lead guitar	Recording engineer	
2009	War and Sand	Krysta Nick		Pedal steel		
2009	It's Been Worth It All	Dorothy Norwood	Malaco Records	Pedal steel		
2009	Welcome Home	Rehab	Universal Republic	Pedal steel		
2009	Keeping Up With the Joneses	Corey Smith	Undertone Records	Pedal steel, dobro		
2009	Create Your Day, Celebrate Your Night	Emily Smith	Spirit Wave Healing	Pedal steel, keyboard, synthesizer	Music production, recording and mixdown engineer	
2009	Sufficient Grace	Sufficient Grace		Pedal steel		
2010	Universal You	Nathan Beaver		Pedal steel		
2010	New Hometown	Connor Christian & Southern Gothic		Pedal steel		
2010	Lovin' You Still	Georgia		Pedal steel		
2010	Mulennium	Gov't Mule	Evil Teen	Pedal steel		
2010	Josh Harris	Josh Harris		Pedal steel		
2010	Poverty Is Real	Mike Killeen		Pedal steel		
2010	Manchester Orchestra	Manchester Orchestra		Pedal steel		
2010	The Broken Record	Corey Smith	Undertone Records	Pedal steel		
2010	Whiskey Gentry	Whiskey Gentry		Pedal steel		
2010	Unhyphenated American	Andy Lee White		Pedal steel		
2011	Everybody's Out Tonight	Nathan Beaver		Pedal steel		
2011	Power Up Jingle	Berkely Power Corporation		Pedal steel		
2011	The Oprah Song	Leslie Christian		Pedal steel		
2011	Georgia Fair	Georgia Fair	Sony Music	Pedal steel		
2011	Old North Monroe	James Matthew Hughes		Pedal steel		
2011		The Internationals		Pedal steel, dobro, lap steel	Recording and mixdown engineer	
2011	Signature Jingle	Revolution Radio				
2011	First of Many	Saint Francis		Pedal steel	Mastering engineer	
2011	"Revolution" (on Hemlockfest 2011 compilation CD)	Saint Francis		Pedal steel		
2011	Revolution Radio Signature	Saint Francis		Pedal steel		
2011	Andy Velo	Andy Velo		Pedal steel		
2011	Jayron Weaver	Jayron Weaver		Pedal steel, dobro		
2012	Demo	Kristen Englenz		Pedal steel	Recording and mixdown engineer, producer	
2015	Shine On the Waters of My Soul	Victor Johnson	Beautiful Things	Pedal steel		
?		Aslyn		Pedal steel		
?		Leslie Barnett		Pedal steel		
?	For the Lord is Royalty	Steven Kern		Pedal steel	Recording and mixdown engineer, co-producer	
?	Long Journey	Mike Mermin		Pedal steel, dobro		
?	Compilation	Star Route USA		Pedal steel		
?		Sundiver		Pedal steel		
?	Drive	Francisco Vidal Band		Pedal steel		
