= Live and Acoustic from Tree Sound Studios =

Live and Acoustic From Tree Sound Studios

Live album by Rehab
- Released: 2008
- Length: 44:19
- Label: Universal Republic

Rehab chronology
Graffiti the World (2008)	Live and Acoustic From Tree Sound Studios (2008)	Welcome Home (2010)

An album by the band Rehab containing live and acoustic versions of previously released material and a few previously unreleased tracks.

== Track listing ==
No.	Title	Length
1.	"Intro"	2:06
2.	"It Don't Matter"	4:20
3.	"Drinkin' Problem"	3:44
4.	"Graffiti the World"	4:09
5.	"7 Deserts"	0:25
6.	"We Live"	3:11
7.	"Isosceles"	0:25
8.	"Walk Away"	3:54
9.	"Bottles and Cans"	2:49
10.	"Burt Reynolds Feat. Demun Jones"	3:55
11.	"Can't Remember Feat. Demun Jones"	5:42
12.	"Chest Pain"	3:03
13.	"Guilty"	6:36
