= CMTS =

CMTS may refer to:

- United States Committee on the Marine Transportation System
- Cable modem termination system

== See also ==
- Combat medical technician
- CMT (disambiguation)
