= Sittin' at a Bar =

Compilation album by Rehab
- Released: May 27, 2008
- Length: 48:19
- Label: Epic

Rehab chronology
Graffiti the World (2005)	Sittin' at a Bar (2008)	Welcome Home (2010)

Professional ratings
Review scores
Source	Rating
Allmusic	link

Sittin' at a Bar is a repackaging of Rehab's 2000 studio album Southern Discomfort, with a shuffled track listing. Epic Records put it out to capitalize on the success of the song "Sittin' at a Bar" which had been re-recorded and released as a single by the band's new label, Universal.

== Track list ==
1. "Sittin' At A Bar" (3:37)
2. "Hey Fred" (3:58)
3. "Storm Chaser" (feat. Cee-Lo Green & Big Gipp of Goodie Mob) (3:30)
4. "Crazy People" (3:10)
5. "Scarecrow" (3:41)
6. "It Don't Matter" (3:40)
7. "Drinkin' Problem" (feat. Steaknife) (3:34)
8. "Rattle My Cage" (3:05)
9. "More Like You" (feat. Mandy Lauderdale) (3:49)
10. "Miss Jones" (3:36)
11. "Thinkin Again" (4:50)
12. "Kick My Ass" (4:11)
13. "Sittin' At A Bar (Karaoke Version)" (3:38)
