= New Hometown =

New Hometown may refer to:

- "New Hometown", a song by Sara Evans from the album Real Fine Place
- "New Hometown", a song by Mike Ryan
- New Hometown, an album by the band The Southern Gothic
