= Gullible's Travels =

Gullible's Travels may refer to:

- Gullible's Travels (Brobdingnagian Bards album), 2000
- Gullible's Travels (Rehab album), 2012
- Gullible's Travels, a 1917 book by Ring Lardner
- "Gullible's Travels", a song by Soul Asylum from their 1990 album And the Horse They Rode In On
- Gullible's Travels, a 2000 recording by Marc Gunn
- Gullible's Travels, a 2002 novel by Matt Hughes
- Gullible's Travels, a book by Cash Peters
- Gullible's Travels, a book by Billy Connolly
- Gullible's Travels, a screenplay by Ron J. Friedman and Steve Bencich
