= Mulennium =

Live album by Gov't Mule
- Released: August 3, 2010
- Recorded: December 31, 1999/ January 1, 2000
- Length: 199:29
- Label: Evil Teen

Gov't Mule chronology
By a Thread (2009)	Mulennium (2010)	Shout! (2013)

Professional ratings
Review scores
Source	Rating
PopMatters	(6/10)

Mulennium is a live album by American southern rock band Gov't Mule. It includes all three sets from the band's December 31, 1999/January 1, 2000 New Year's Eve show at the Roxy Theatre in Atlanta, Georgia. The band had headlined the same venue exactly one year before, which resulted in their second live album Live... With a Little Help from Our Friends. Unlike that release, which came out within a year of the actual concert, Mulennium was not released until 2010.

"Bad Little Doggie" begins the set, as many Mule shows have over the years, with the stage introduction by Kirk West, longtime Allman Brothers Band roadie and "tour mystic". West's introduction was in keeping with the theme of North Georgia shows, Athens, Macon and Atlanta as the 'best cup of coffee'. "Countdown Jam" was played while the band was waiting to count down to midnight. "21st Century Schizoid Man", which followed as the new year began, was chosen to usher in the new millennium. Warren played slide guitar to usher in the new Millennium using his vocal mic stand in place of a Coricidin medicine bottle.

During stage banter between songs, Milton informed the crowd that it was Haynes who provided the idea for the title of Milton's album released earlier that year, Welcome to Little Milton. This concert was the first time that Gov't Mule had played the following songs in concert: "21st Century Schizoid Man", "We're Not Gonna Take It", "Dazed and Confused", "My Dog And Me", "Helter Skelter" and "Sometimes Salvation".

== Track listing ==
(The songwriters are listed in brackets)

=== Disc 1 ===
1. "Bad Little Doggie" (Haynes/Woody) – 4:46
2. "Lay Your Burden Down" (Haynes/Barbiero) – 5:07
3. "Blind Man in the Dark" (Haynes) – 7:35
4. "Life Before Insanity" (Haynes/Louis) – 7:16
5. "Larger than Life" (Haynes) – 6:08
6. "Towering Fool" (Haynes/Abts) – 8:20
7. "Countdown Jam" (Haynes/Woody/Abts) – 1:34
8. "21st Century Schizoid Man" (Fripp/Giles/Lake/McDonald/Sinfield) – 6:15
9. "We're Not Gonna Take It" (Townshend) – 3:52
10. "Dazed and Confused" (Holmes – arrangement by Page) – 11:47

=== Disc 2 ===
1. "When the Blues Come Knockin'" (Haynes/Jaworowicz) – 5:54
2. "My Dog and Me" (Campbell) – 10:17
3. "Lump on Your Stump" (Campbell) – 7:56
4. "I Can't Quit You Baby" (Dixon) – 11:38
5. "It Hurts Me Too" (Sehorn) – 10:10
6. "Blues is Alright" (Campbell) – 8:17
7. "Is It My Body?" (Bruce/Buxton/Cooper/Dunaway/Smith) – 5:30
8. "Power of Soul" (Hendrix) – 13:27

=== Disc 3 ===
1. "Helter Skelter" (Lennon–McCartney) – 3:44
2. "Sometimes Salvation" (Robinson/Robinson) – 4:08
3. "30 Days in the Hole" (Marriott) – 6:27
4. "End of the Line" (Allman/Haynes/Jaworowicz/Woody) – 9:00
5. "Out of the Rain" (White) – 11:13
6. "I Shall Be Released" (Dylan) – 11:07
7. "Simple Man" (King/Rossington/Van Zant) – 15:44
8. "Crowd" – 1:46

== Personnel ==
=== Gov't Mule ===
- Warren Haynes – guitar, vocals
- Allen Woody – bass, mandolin
- Matt Abts – drums, percussion

=== Additional personnel ===
- Audley Freed – guitar (disc 2, tracks 7–8; all of disc 3)
- Robert Kearns – percussion, bass, vocals (disc 3, tracks 3 and 6)
- Little Milton – guitar, vocals (disc 2, tracks 1–6)
- Johnny Mosier – guitar (disc 3, tracks 5–6)
- Barry Richman – guitar (disc 3, track 6)
- Mark van Allen – pedal steel (disc 3, tracks 5–7)
- Michael Barbiero – mixer
