= CMT =

CMT may refer to:

== Broadcasting ==
- Canal Maximo Televisión, a defunct Venezuelan TV network
- Castilla–La Mancha TV, now CMM TV, a Spanish regional channel
- CMT (American TV channel)
- CMT (Canadian TV channel)
- CMT (Australian TV channel)

== Science and technology ==
=== Computing ===
- Clustered multi-thread, AMD CPU technology
- Chip-level multithreading, a Sun Microsystems technique
- Container managed transactions in Jakarta Enterprise Beans

=== Medicine ===
- California mastitis test
- Charcot–Marie–Tooth disease of the peripheral nervous system
- Chemically modified tetracyclines, a type of tetracycline antibiotics
- Certified massage therapist
- Combat medical technician

=== Other uses in science and technology ===
- Mercury cadmium telluride
- Cold metal transfer, a welding technique

== Other uses ==
- Carrier Mortar Tracked, an Indian self-propelled mortar
- Chartered Market Technician, a term used by the CMT Association of technical analysts
- Compulsory military training in New Zealand
- Connecticut Mastery Test, a school test
- Culturally modified tree, a tree modified as part of tradition
- CMT Buses, later Glenvale Transport, a British bus company
- Transitional Military Council (Chad) (Conseil militaire de transition)
- World Confederation of Labour (Confédération Mondiale du Travail)

== See also ==
- CMT Music Awards
