= Cuz We Can =

Studio album by Rehab
- Released: December 9, 2002 (Internet Release); March 13, 2007 (Pressed Release)
- Recorded: 2001–2002
- Length: 76:20
- Label: Attica Sound / Arshid Entertainment
- Producer: Steaknife

Rehab chronology
Southern Discomfort (2000)	Cuz We Can (2002)	Graffiti the World (2005)

Cuz We Can is the third studio album by Rehab. Originally available online in 2002, a pressed copy was released March 13, 2007. It is the last album to feature rapper Brooks Buford as he parted ways soon after this album was released online by him.

== Background ==
Following the success of their official debut album Southern Discomfort, and coming off Warped Tour, the duo got to work on their third album. Many songs were recorded during these sessions, reuniting with former Rehab member Denny "Steaknife" Campbell.

Following the sessions, the group played the new songs for their label Destiny to have the tracks rejected and criticized by the label executives. After this, Rehab was sent to LA to complete more songs for the follow-up, rather than being dropped from Destiny.

According to a Facebook post by Brooks Buford, Danny Boone called Buford on the phone citing "he did not want to be in a group called Rehab." The group split up soon after. Danny Boone confirmed this on the WRBN podcast, adding he was not interested in the direction of the new music.

On December 9, 2002, as Rehab was coming to an end, Brooks Buford released a set of 22 unreleased Rehab songs on his website that appeared to be the complete third Rehab album in order including skits and interludes. These songs later became known as "CuzWeCan" which was what Danny Boone named the album in 2007 when he scrapped some of the initial songs and decided to officially press it. (Omitting Busted, So Green, Defeated, Aim To Please, Jesus Loves Me, and That Bad) Other tracks were renamed by Danny including "Shit On Me" which became "Then Again", "Huh What?" into "Do You?").

Fans have highly regarded Cuz We Can, often citing it their best work. Over the years Rehab has performed certain songs including Bonfire, Lawn Chair High, and I've Landed.

Brooks Buford released his debut solo album "Straight Outta Rehab" on Arista in 2003. Some of these songs use instrumentals and other sections (often redone) from Cuz We Can as Buford boasts in the Notraprock intro "I don't mean to rub it in but I got all my publishing." Many other lines take shots at Danny and Rehab including the songs "No J4U" and "Run Thingz". The label shut down the same year, before Buford could get a worldwide release.

On Danny Boone's WRBN Podcast, he mentions many of the songs from Straight Outta Rehab were reworkings from the LA sessions for Cuz We Can including Aim To Please.

In 2012 Rehab re-recorded the song I've Landed from Cuz We Can.

== Track listing (2002 Internet release) ==
1. "Intro (WFUK AM 420)" - 1:06
2. "Here Come The Demons" - 2:54
3. "Bonfire" - 3:59
4. "Busted" - 4:00
5. "Paranoid" - 3:55
6. "We Ain't Come To Play" - 4:14
7. "Run" - 3:50
8. "E.M.S." - 0:42
9. "I've Landed" - 4:16
10. "No Time To Grieve" - 3:07
11. "So Green" - 3:54
12. "Defeated" - 5:01
13. "Aim To Please (feat. Killer Mike)" - 4:46
14. "Halftime" - 0:59
15. "Sleeping Giant (feat. Killer Mike)" - 3:42
16. "Rehab Function" - 3:15
17. "Jesus Loves Me" - 4:04
18. "Him And Her" - 3:27
19. "Huh What" - 4:24
20. "Shit On Me" - 3:21
21. "Jaime" - 3:43
22. "Amends" - 4:28
23. "Ballad Of Dusty" - 3:27
24. "Lawn Chair High (feat. Steaknife)" - 5:07
25. "That Bad" - 3:08
26. "Post-Game Show" - 0:32

== Track listing (2007 pressed copy) ==
1. "Intro (WFUK AM 420)" – 1:06
2. "Here Come The Demons" – 2:54
3. "Bonfire" – 3:59
4. "We Ain't Come To Play" – 4:14
5. "Jaime" – 3:43
6. "Lawn Chair High (feat. Steaknife)" – 5:07
7. "Interlude" – 0:41
8. "Paranoid" – 3:55
9. "Rehab Function" – 3:15
10. "Run" – 3:50
11. "Interlude" – 0:58
12. "Sleeping Giant (feat. Killer Mike)" – 3:42
13. "Deal With Me" – 3:27
14. "The Ballad Of Dusty Spires" – 3:27
15. "Do You" – 4:24
16. "Then Again" – 3:21
17. "Amends" – 4:28
18. "Running For An Earhole" – 4:12
19. "Sixteen Tons (feat. Steaknife)" – 4:13
20. "Come On Children" - 3:30
21. "Love Me Tomorrow" - 3:44
22. "Just Let Go" - 3:58

== Personnel ==
Danny "Boone" Alexander - Vocals
Jason "Brooks" Buford - Vocals
Denny "Steaknife" Campbell - Producer, vocals
DJ Detail - Producer, turntables
