= Gullible's Travels (Rehab album) =

Studio album by Rehab
- Released: February 21, 2012
- Length: 40:11
- Label: AVJ Records/Boonbox

Rehab chronology
Welcome Home (2010)	Gullible's Travels (2012)	Fixtape 2 (2012)

Gullible's Travels is the sixth studio album by Rehab, released in February 2012. It was released on the indie label AVJ Records, a subsidiary of Average Joes Entertainment.

== Track listing ==
No.	Title	Length
1.	"Intro (Wasn't So Bad)"	1:15
2.	"Waho By the Hoti"	4:00
3.	"Why Do I Do"	3:32
4.	"King of Tweakers"	3:22
5.	"Evidence"	3:55
6.	"Scared of Change"	3:33
7.	"Can't Catch Up"	4:51
8.	"Guilty"	4:09
9.	"Crazy Girl"	4:05
10.	"Eat Sleep"	3:40
11.	"Kept on Walking"	3:49
