= Bartender Song (Sittin' at a Bar) =

2008 single by Rehab

Single by Rehab

from the album Graffiti the World
- Released: May 27, 2008
- Recorded: 2008
- Genre: Country blues
- Length: 3:49
- Label: Universal Republic
- Songwriter: Rehab
- Producer: Rehab

Rehab singles chronology
"Bump" (2006)	"Bartender Song (Sittin' at a Bar)" (2008)	"1980" (2008)

Music video
- "Bartender Song (Sittin' at a Bar)" on YouTube

"Bartender Song (Sittin' at a Bar)" is a song by Rehab. It was released in May 2008 as the third single from their fourth album, Graffiti the World (2005). It was the band's first single to chart on the Billboard Hot 100, at #64.

The song originally appeared as "Sittin' at a Bar" on the band's second album Southern Discomfort in 2000, released by Epic Records. The band were subsequently dropped by Epic in 2002, but the song became an underground hit on the internet and on jukeboxes. Rehab were later signed by Universal Records, with Avery Lipman (Co-President of Universal) describing the single as a "viral phenomenon" and stating that he had signed the band based on the success of their jukebox airplay,

== 2008 Re-recording ==
Rehab re-recorded the song, now titled Bartender Song (Sittin' at a Bar) for the Universal Records re-release of their independent 2005 album Graffiti the World. The song was released as a single in May 2008, charting at #64 on the Billboard Hot 100, making it their most successful release to date. The music video for the single featured Danny Trejo as the bartender and has a cameo from Larry Wilcox. Without their permission, their old label Epic re-released Southern Discomfort, retitling the album Sittin' at a Bar in order to capitalize on the success of the 2008 single.

== Remix featuring Hank Williams Jr. ==
In August 2008, a new radio-friendly remix of the single was released by Universal, featuring Hank Williams Jr. singing the second verse. The song peaked at #60 on the country charts. The music video takes place primarily in a bar, and depicts the events in the song. Hank Williams and his daughter Holly Williams also appear in that version's music video, with Holly playing the role of the bartender. The remix was covered by Internet cartoon band Your Favorite Martian on August 29, 2012.

== Charts ==
Chart (2008–2009)	Peak Position
US Billboard Hot 100	64
US Alternative Airplay (Billboard)	11
US Mainstream Rock Tracks (Billboard)	22
US Pop Airplay (Billboard)	33
US Hot Country Songs (Billboard)	60

== Certifications ==
Region	Certification	Certified units/sales
United States (RIAA)	3× Platinum	3,000,000^{‡}
^{‡} Sales+streaming figures based on certification alone.
