= Rehab (band) =

American hip-hop group

- The duo most known for being Rehab. Brooks Buford on the left and Danny Boone on the right

Background information
- Origin: Warner Robins, Georgia, U.S.
- Genres: Hip-hop
- Years active: 1998–2002; 2005–2014; 2017–present
- Labels: Epic; Rehab/Atticasound; Universal Republic; Average Joe's Entertainment; BooneBox Records; ONErpm
- Members: Danny "Boone" Alexander; Denny “Steaknife” Campbell; Austin “Dj Uh-Oh” Sanderson; Brandon Dover; Ian Corabi; Joey Malik
- Past members: Jason Brooks 'Buford'; Jericho; Mike Hartnett; Jeff Wright; Hano Leathers; FOZ; Lamar Williams Jr.; Demun Jones; DJ Chris Crisis; Chris Hood
- Website: http://www.rehabtheband.com/

Rehab is an American hip-hop group from Warner Robins, Georgia. The band recorded seven albums, initially as the duo of Danny "Boone" Alexander and Jason "Brooks" Buford, before Buford left the group and Alexander continued with the band as a quintet.

== History ==
=== 1998–1999: Formation and debut ===
Rehab was originally formed by vocalists Danny "Boone" Alexander and Jason "Brooks" Buford, with producer Denny "Steaknife" Campbell.

Boone and Campbell (both from Warner Robins, Georgia) were previously the rap group "Prime Suspect". Alexander and Buford were recovering alcoholics and drug addicts, and while it is a common misconception they met at a rehab facility, the trio did not meet within rehabilitation. Early on, they released their first album To Whom It May Consume produced by Campbell and Buford.

=== 2000–2002: Departure of Steaknife, and Southern Discomfort ===
Soon after To Whom It May Consume, Campbell was incarcerated and Epic/Sony offered a record deal to Buford and Alexander as a duo. Mashing rap with rock, the duo released their major label debut album, Southern Discomfort, in 2000 on the Sony label. Cee-Lo & Bigg Gipp of Goodie Mob, Mandy Lauderdale and Cody ChesnuTT were the guests on the album, which spawned the Top 15 modern rock hit "It Don't Matter", and "Sittin' At A Bar".

Two years were spent on the road supporting the album touring with Kottonmouth Kings and the Phunk Junkeez, including a stint on the Warped Tour.

=== 2002–2004: Cuz We Can, departure of Buford, and hiatus ===
For reasons not publicly clarified, Buford left the band, and released 26 unreleased Rehab songs on his website towards the end of his tenure. This collection was later known to fans as Cuz We Can. 22 of the 26 songs were produced by Denny "Steaknife" Campbell, and the album was later given out on tours by Boone in 2007. Boone also modified the track list of the pressed version, removing certain songs and adding new ones, in light of Buford's departure.

After two years on the road supporting the Vans Warped Tour and playing with bands such as Linkin Park, the group went on an indefinite hiatus. Buford did not return to the group, however, later appeared as host of 2005's Trailer Fabulous on MTV and recorded a single for the show's theme, before joining the short-lived project The Audio Club with Tommy Hendriksen.

=== 2004–2010: Reformation, Graffiti the World, and Welcome Home ===
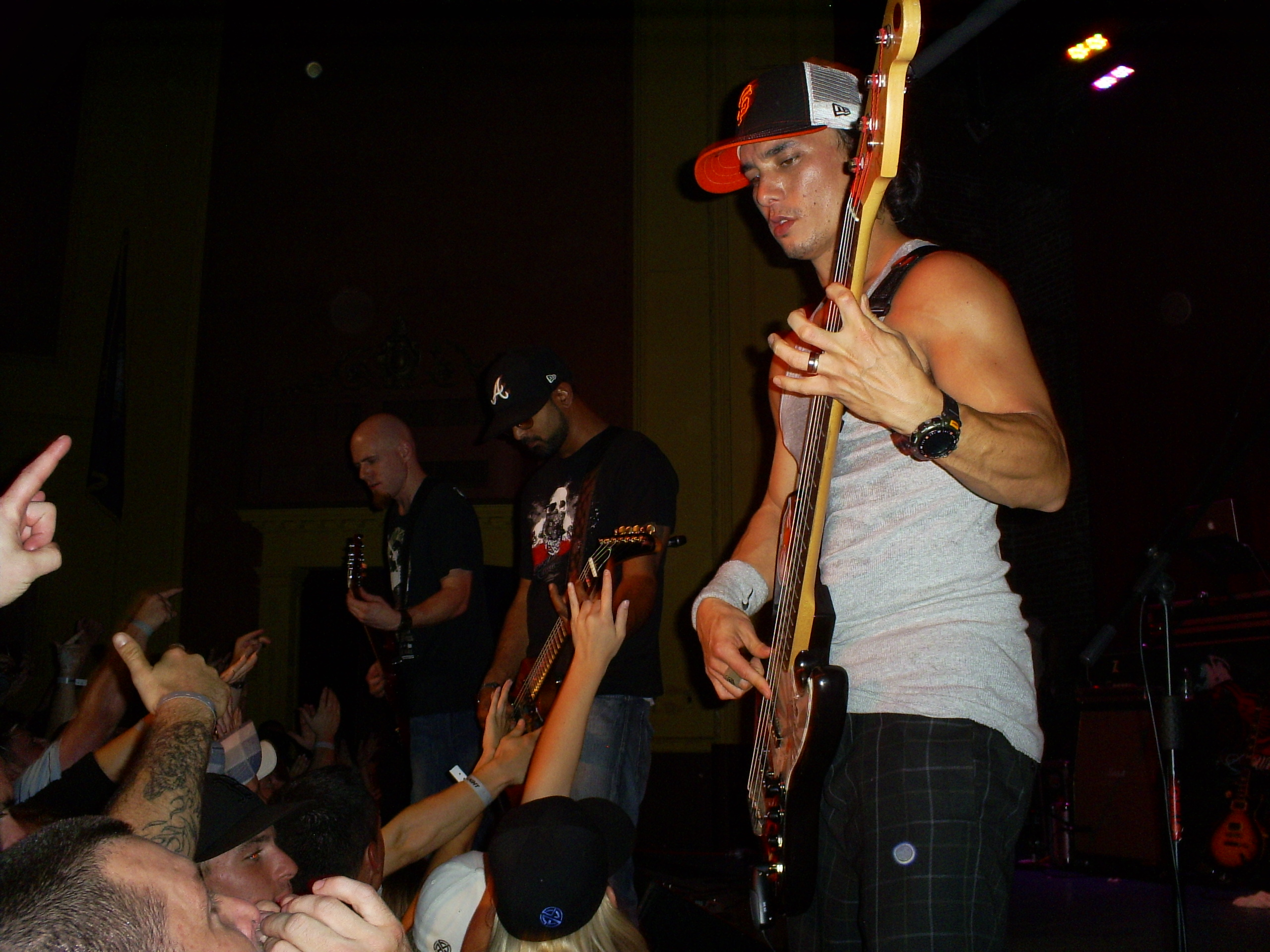
Rehab in Exeter New Hampshire at the Ioka Theatre in 2008

In 2004, Boone connected with Atlanta producer Shannon Houchins. WIth Houchins, a new band was assembled consisting of guitarist Mike Hartnett, Hano Leathers, Chris Hood and Foz. Now a quintet with Alexander, Rehab signed with Arshid Entertainment and released Graffiti the World in 2005.

Sometime in 2008, the three original members decided to do a reunion EP and go by the name Southern Discomfort. Their label saw this and decided to halt most of the promotion, since the name of Southern Discomfort was essentially owned by Epic/Sony. As a result, the label released Sitting at a Bar, which was a re-release of their debut album. All of this was done without the band's permission.

To fight this unauthorized reissue, the band re-recorded the single and renamed it "Bartender Song." This version would end up on a 2008 version of Graffiti the World released by the major label, Universal. Rehab stuck with Universal for their 2010 album Welcome Home, which saw a handful of singles on the Top 30 video countdown for CMT through January 2011.

=== 2011–2014: Gullible's Travels and breakup ===
Gullible's Travels was released on February 21, 2012 through AVJ Records (a subsidiary label of Average Joe's Entertainment) owned by former Rehab producer and manager Shannon Houchins and country music artist Colt Ford. Touring followed with the single "Waho by the Hoti" ("the Waffle House by the hotel"). The video for their single "King of Tweakers", which was released on their website in the summer of 2011, premiered on February 21, 2012 with the album release. A video for the next single "Can't Catch Up To You" was also recorded.

On July 3, 2013, a track by Twiztid was released off their first mixtape A New Nightmare entitled "Unjust love", featuring Danny Alexander.

The band released a 2013 single "Whore" which would be the last recorded content by the band. In 2014, the band released a statement to their fans that they would be going on a farewell tour and disband to form solo careers. Before the break, the band recorded a full album titled Million Dollar Mugshot, which Average Joes Entertainment did not release until 2017.

=== 2015–2016: Possible reformation ===
Sometime in June 2015, former founding member Denny Campbell posted on his Facebook page that said there was a possible Rehab reunion between Alexander and himself. He continued to post pictures of him and Boone in the studio as well. On March 19, 2016, a possible album cover was posted on Rehab's website. On September 1, 2017, Million Dollar Mug Shot was finally released.

=== 2017–present: Reformation ===
On December 31, 2017, Alexander announced via video on the official Rehab Facebook page that Rehab had returned. In the video, he stated there would be new music and tour in 2018. He also stated that the band lineup is now Danny Boone and Jericho, in addition to a full band.

On April 12, 2019, the studio album titled Galaga was released. This is the first album released independently with the help of ONErpm. Full tours in 2019 and 2020 followed. The tour included a band but with a different lineup as prior iteration as seen below.

== Band members ==
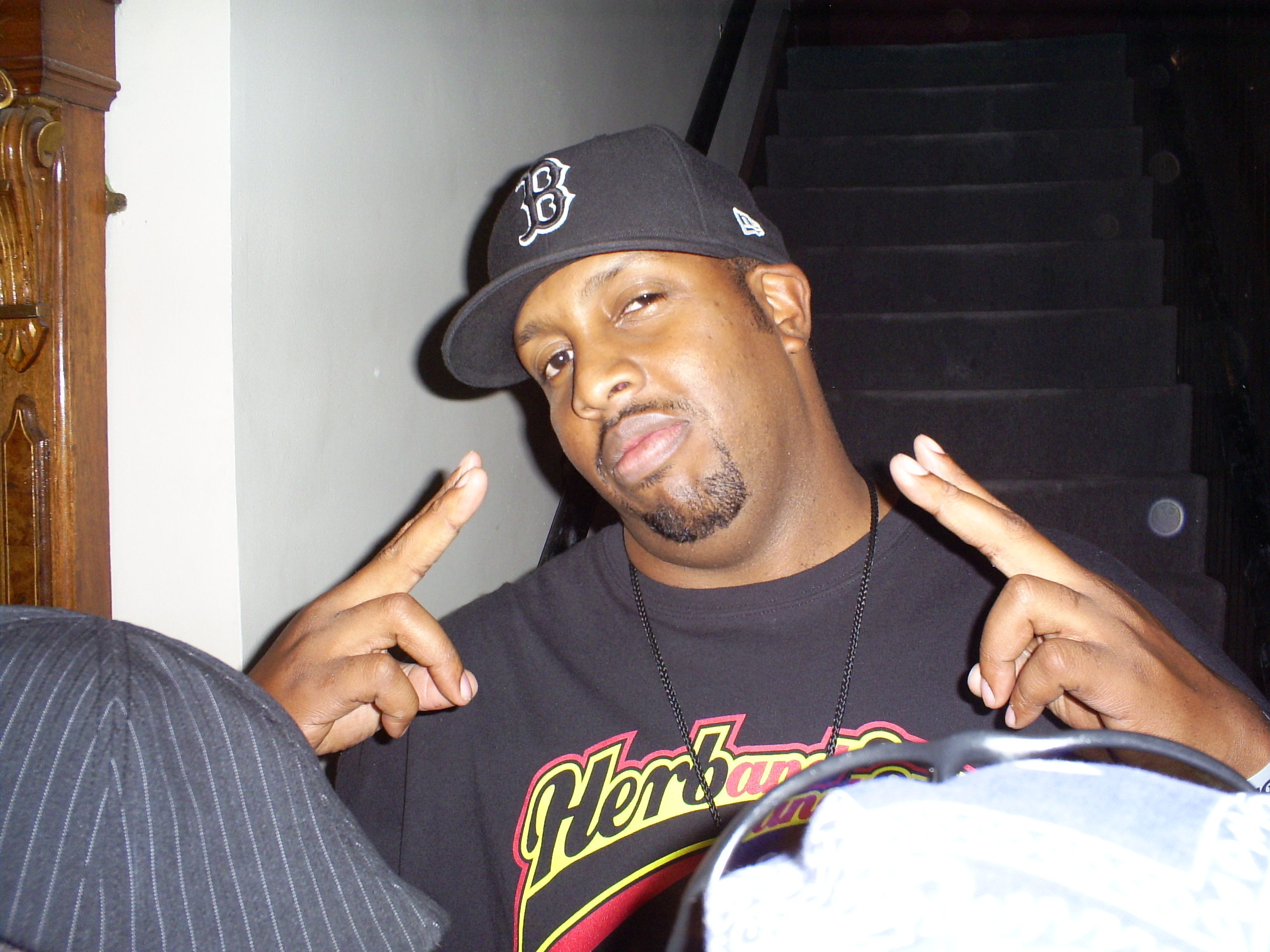
Chris Hood

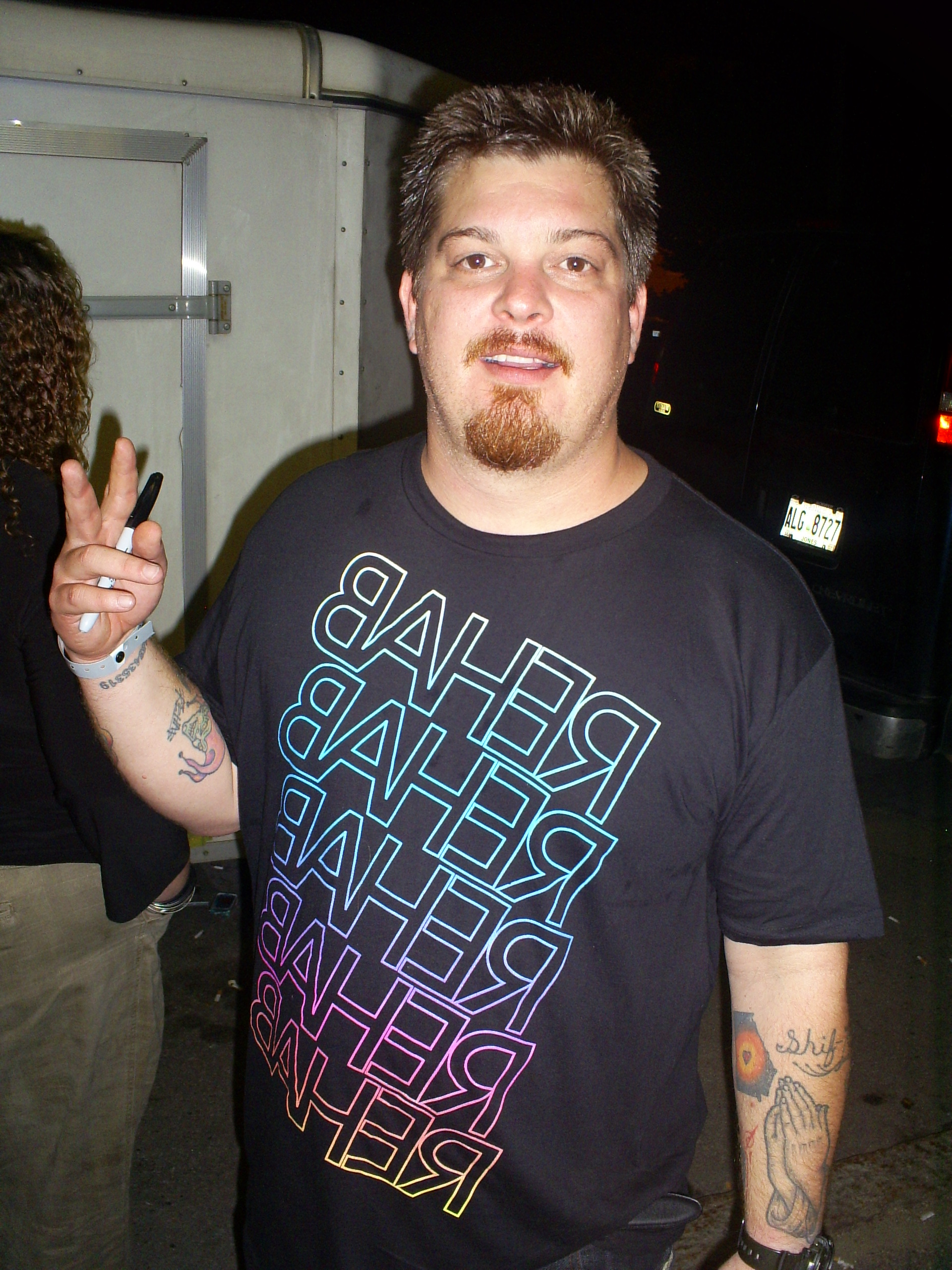
Danny Boone Alexander

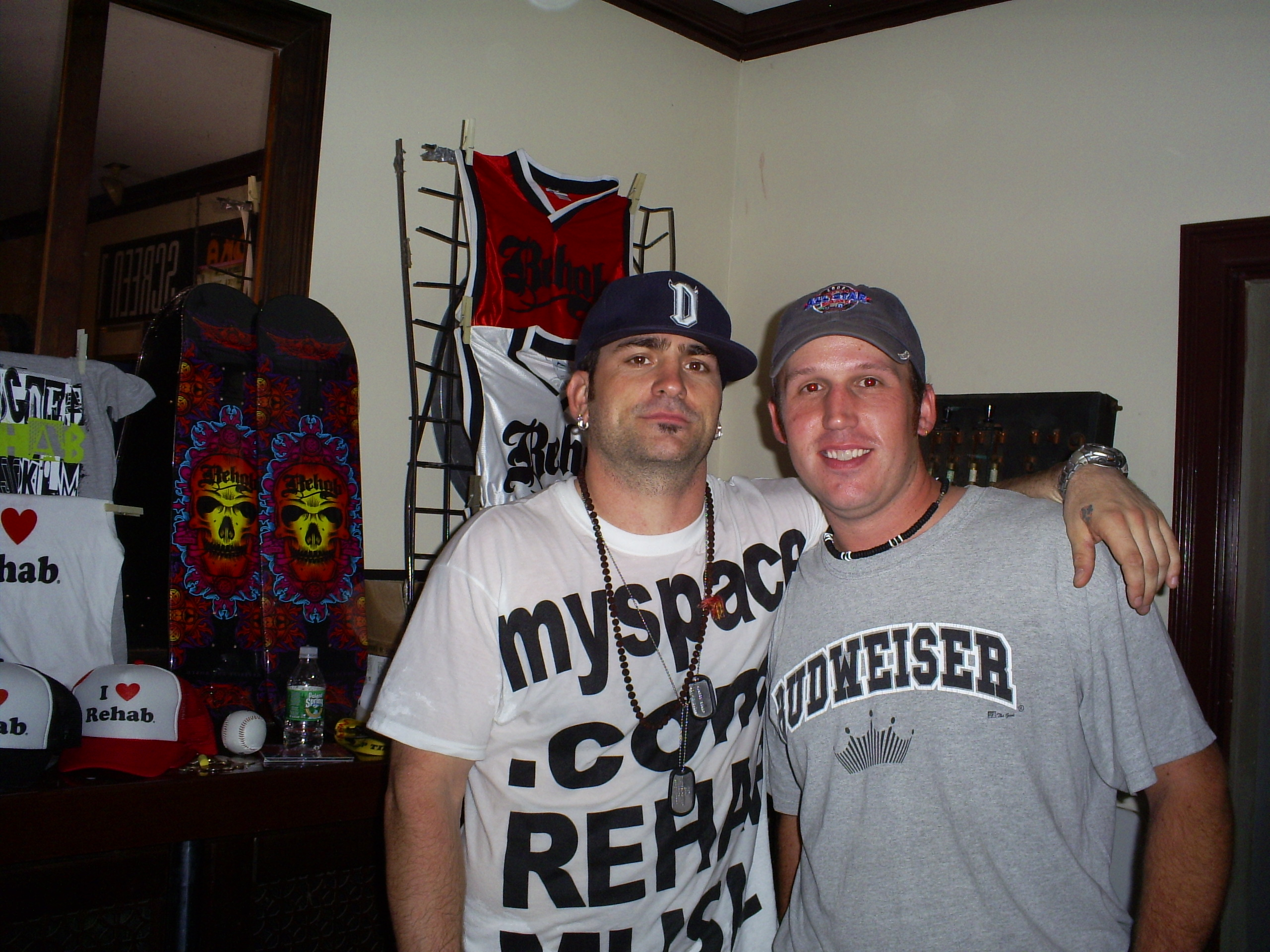
Demun Jones on the left

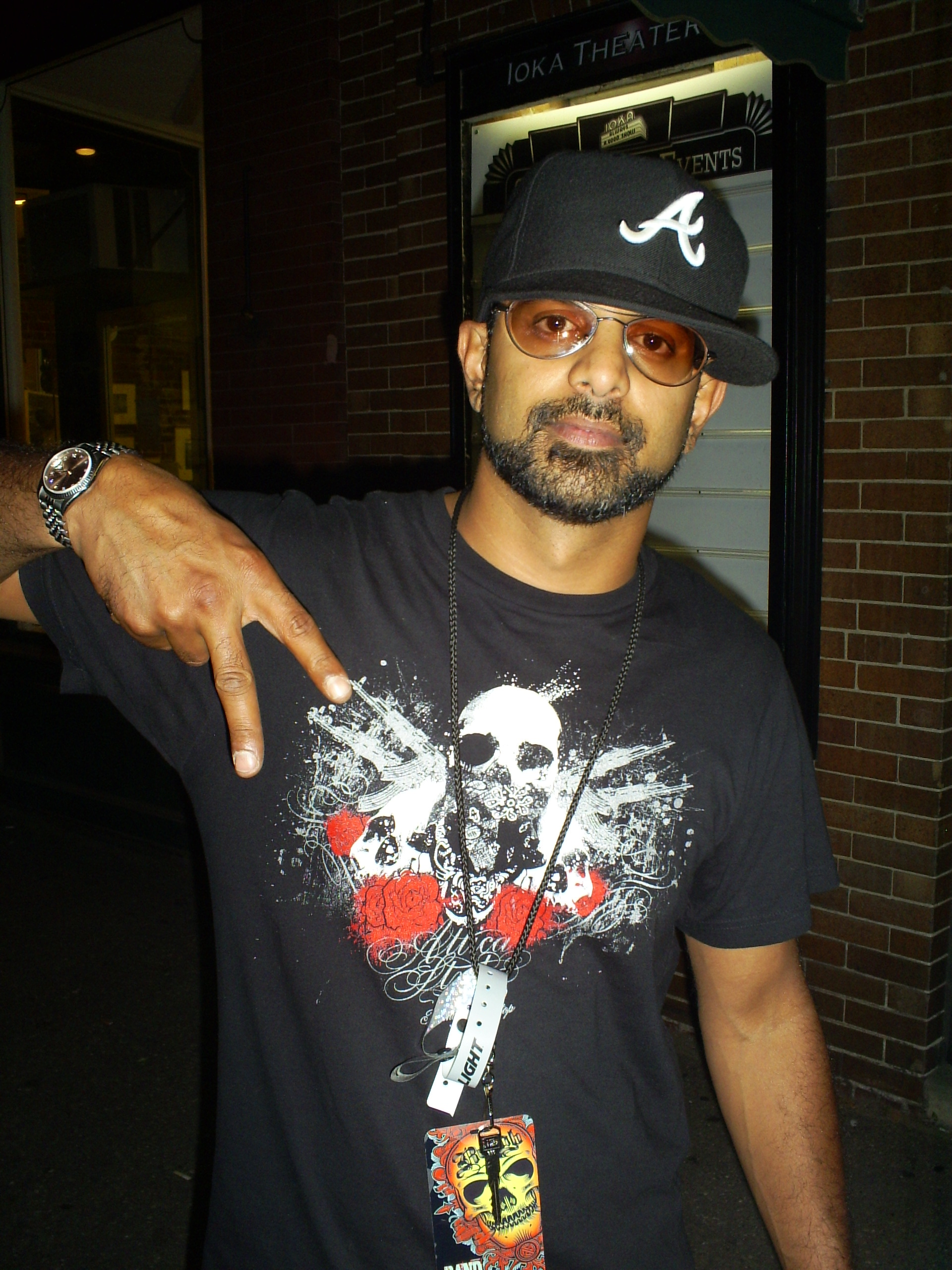
Foz

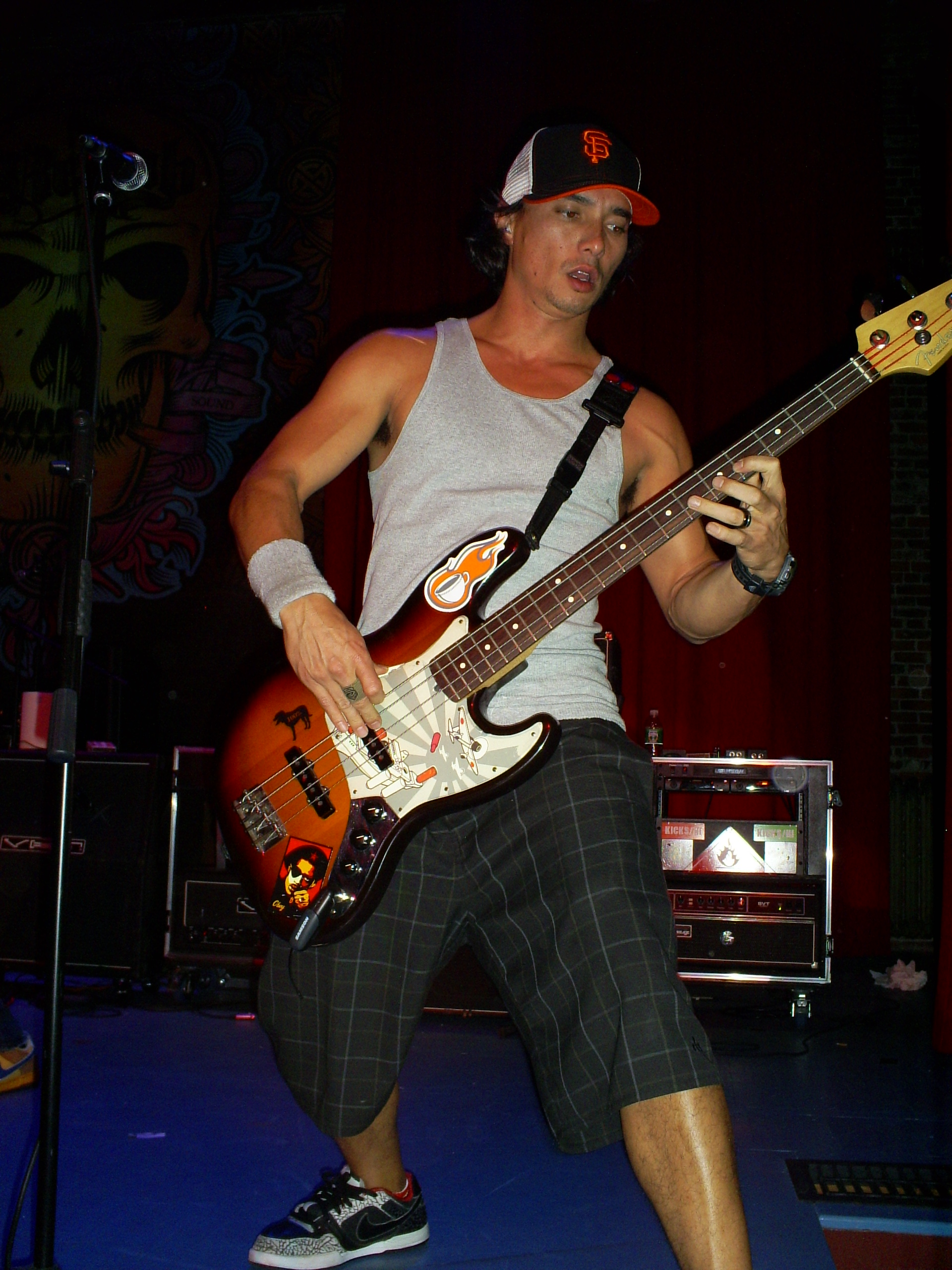
Hano Leathers

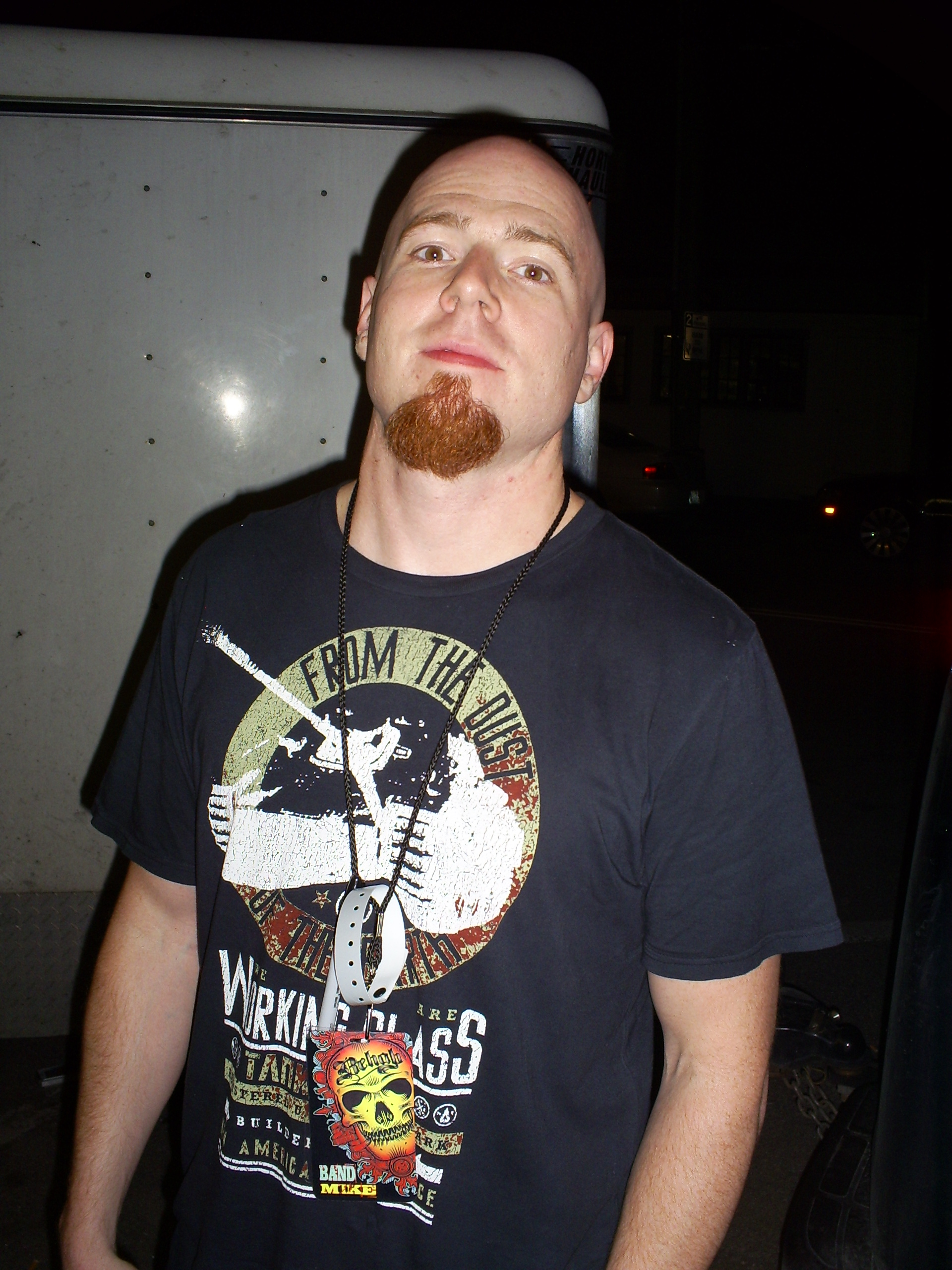
Mike Hartnett

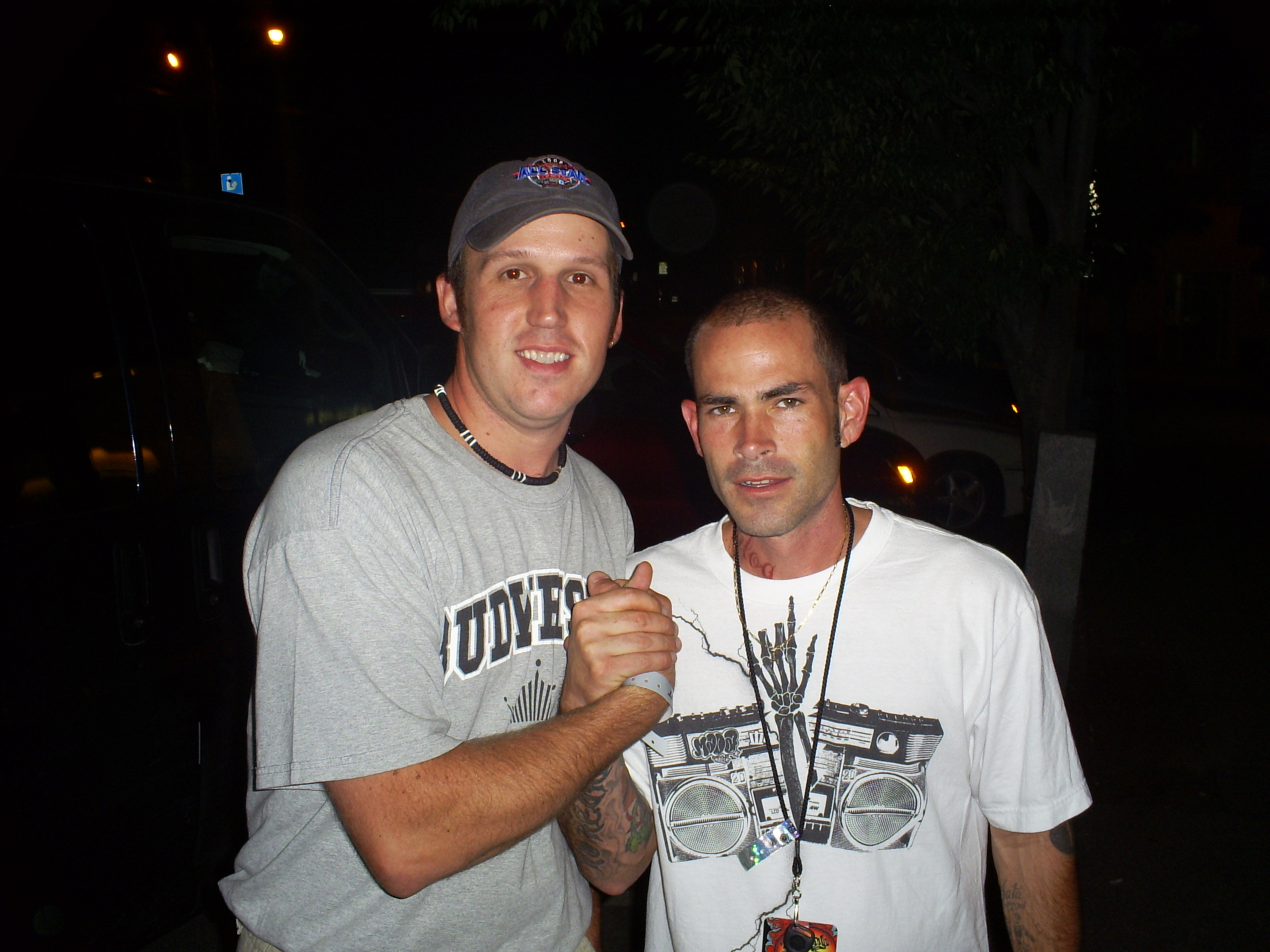
Steaknife on the right

Current lineup

- Danny "Boone" Alexander (vocals)
- Doyle Williams (lead guitar)
- Nate Lee (bass)
- Ian Corabi (drums)

Former members

- Jason "Brooks" Buford (vocals)
- Lamar Williams Jr. (vocals)
- Hano Leathers (bass)
- Fazal "Foz" Syed (guitar)
- Mike Hartnett (guitar)
- Demun Jones (vocals)
- DJ Chris Crisis (turntables)
- Chris Hood (drums)
- Jeff Wright (Guitar)
- Doyle Williams (guitar)
- Jericho Stone (vocals)
- Caleb Melvin (Drummer)
- Taylor Robins (guitar)
- Denny Campbell (Steaknife) (vocals)
- Brandon Dover (bass)
- DJ Uh Oh (turntables)
- Joey Malik (guitar)

Timeline

== Discography ==
=== Albums ===
==== Studio albums ====
List of studio albums, with selected chart positions
Title	Album details	Peak chart positions		
Title	Album details	US	US Alt.	US Heat.
To Whom It May Consume	Released: July 13, 1999; Label: Lambnut; Formats: CD, CD-R, digital download	—	—	—
Southern Discomfort	Released: October 24, 2000; Label: Epic; Formats: CD, digital download, cassette (CS)	—	—	22
Cuz We Can	Originally: 2002 (Internet release); Re-released: March 13, 2007 (pressed copy); Label: Attica Sound / Arshid Entertainment; Formats: CD, digital download	—	—	—
Graffiti the World	Released: July 15, 2005; Re-Released 2008; Label: Attica, Arshid, Universal Republic; Formats: CD, digital download	90	24	1
Sittin' at a Bar	Released: May 27, 2008; Label: Epic; Formats: CD, digital download	—	—	25
Welcome Home	Released: September 7, 2010; Label: Universal Republic; Formats: CD, digital download	—	—	—
Gullible's Travels	Released: February 21, 2012; Label: AVJ; Formats: CD, digital download	—	—	—
Million Dollar Mug Shot	Released: September 21, 2017; Label: AVJ; Formats: CD, digital download	—	—	—
Galaga	Released: April 12, 2019; Label: BooneBox Records, ONErpm; Formats: Digital download	—	—	—
"—" denotes a recording that did not chart or was not released in that territory.

==== Live albums ====
List of live albums
Title	Album details
Live and Acoustic	Released: 2008; Label: Universal Republic; Formats: CD, digital download

==== Mix albums ====
List of mix albums
Title	Album details
Fixtape	Released: 2010; Label: Universal Republic; Formats: CD, digital download
Fixtape 2	Released: June 1, 2012; Label: AVJ; Formats: CD, digital download

=== Singles ===
List of singles, with selected chart positions, showing year released and album name
Title	Year	Peak chart positions								Certifications	Album
Title	Year	US	US Act. Rock	US Alt.	US Country	US Main. Rock	US Pop	AUS	NZ	Certifications	Album
"Storm Chaser" (featuring Cee-Lo Green and Big Gipp of Goodie Mob)	2000	—	—	—	—	—	—	—	—		Southern Discomfort
"It Don't Matter"	2001	—	—	20	—	—	—	65	19		Southern Discomfort
"Last Tattoo"	2005	—	—	—	—	—	—	—	—		Graffiti the World
"Bump"	2006	—	—	—	—	—	—	—	—		Graffiti the World
"Bartender Song"	2008	64	—	11	60	22	33	—	—	RIAA: 3× Platinum	Graffiti the World
"1980"	2008	—	—	—	—	—	—	—	—		Graffiti the World
"Welcome Home"	2010	—	39	—	—	—	—	—	—		Welcome Home
"Talk About"	2010	—	—	—	—	—	—	—	—		Welcome Home
"King of Tweakers"	2011	—	—	—	—	—	—	—	—		Gullible's Travels
"Why Do I Do"	2011	—	—	—	—	—	—	—	—		Gullible's Travels
"Waho by the Hoti"	2012	—	—	—	—	—	—	—	—		Gullible's Travels
"Can't Catch Up to You"	2012	—	—	—	—	—	—	—	—		Gullible's Travels
"—" denotes a recording that did not chart or was not released in that territory.

=== Music videos ===
List of music videos, showing year released and director
Title	Year	Director(s)
"Rattle My Cage"	2000	—N/a
"Crazy People"	2000	—N/a
"Storm Chaser"	2000	—N/a
"It Don't Matter"	2001	Jeff Richter
"Bartender Song"	2008	Frank Borin
"Talk About" (Country Mix)	2011	David Poag
"King of Tweakers"	2012	
"Can't Catch Up"	2012	
"Grizzly Bear"	2018	
