= Southern Discomfort (Rehab album) =

Studio album by Rehab
- Released: October 24, 2000
- Recorded: 1999–2000
- Genre: Hip hop
- Length: 47:43
- Label: Epic
- Producer: Nate Smith

Rehab chronology
To Whom It May Consume (1999)	Southern Discomfort (2000)	Cuz We Can (2002)

Singles from Southern Discomfort
- 1. "Storm Chaser" Released: 2000; 2. "It Don't Matter" Released: 2001; 3. "Sittin' at a Bar" Released: May 7, 2001

Professional ratings
Review scores
Source	Rating
Allmusic	3.5/5 stars

Southern Discomfort is the second studio album by the band Rehab. It is their second album, released on October 24, 2000. The album's title refers to Southern Comfort, a brand of liquor. The album includes the hit songs "It Don't Matter" and "Sittin' At A Bar".

== Track listing ==
No.	Title	Length
1.	"Escape Intro"	0:51
2.	"Hey Fred"	3:57
3.	"Storm Chaser" (feat. Cee-Lo & Big Gipp of Goodie Mob)	3:29
4.	"Crazy People"	3:10
5.	"Scarecrow"	3:40
6.	"It Don't Matter"	3:40
7.	"My Addiction (Interlude)"	1:25
8.	"Drinkin' Problem" (feat. Denny aka "Steaknife")	3:33
9.	"Rattle My Cage"	3:06
10.	"More Like You" (feat. Mandy Lauderdale)	3:47
11.	"Sittin' at a Bar"	3:55
12.	"Miss Jones"	3:35
13.	"Mission Impossible"	0:43
14.	"Thinkin' Again"	4:49
15.	"Kick My Ass"	4:13

== Personnel ==
Danny "Boone" Alexander - Vocals
Jason "Brooks" Buford - Vocals
Zane Johnson - Record and Mix Engineer
