= Elise Witt =

American singer

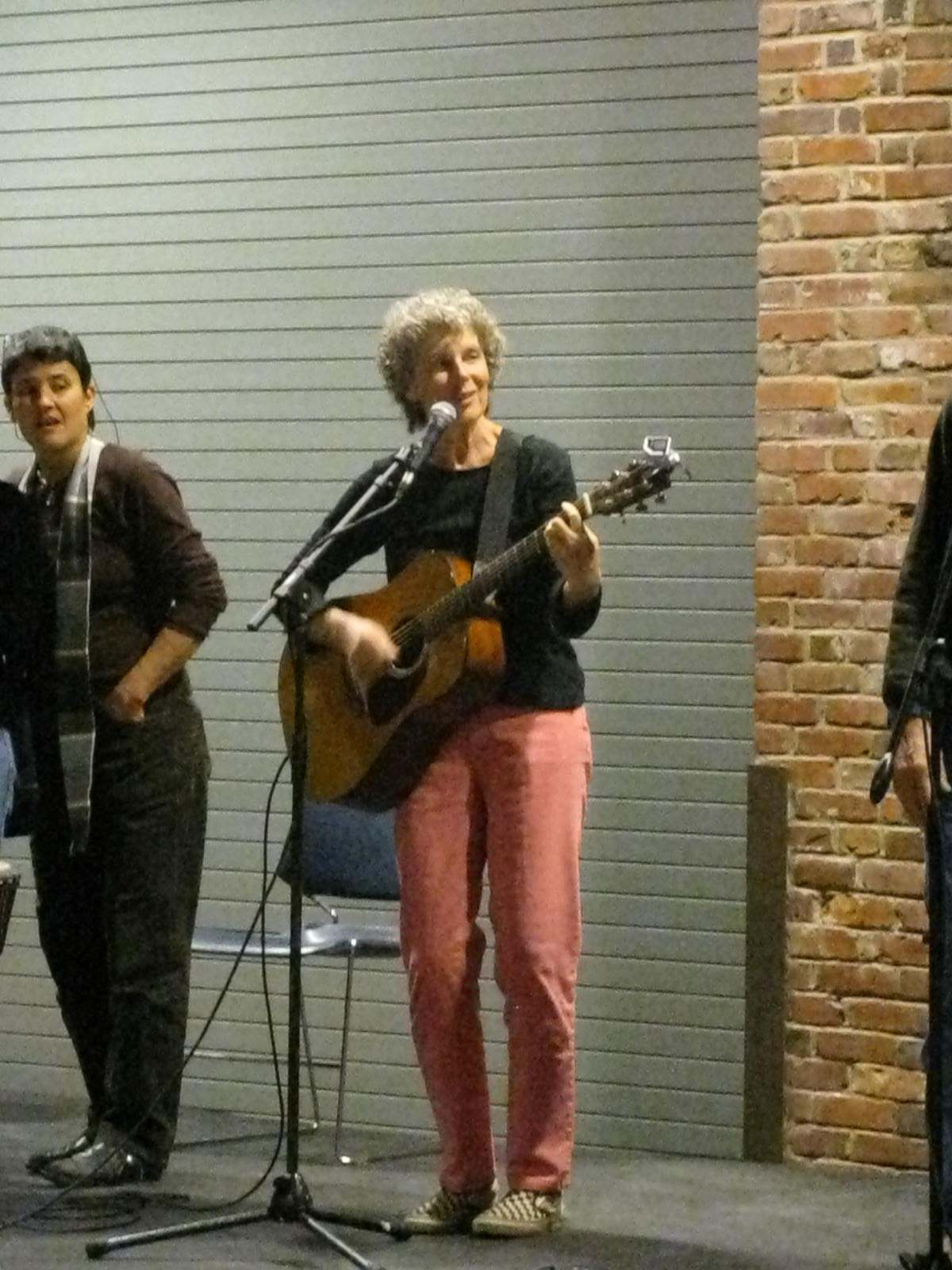

Background information
- Born: 1953 (age 71–72); Switzerland
- Origin: North Carolina
- Genres: Improv
- Occupation: Singer
- Instrument: Vocals
- Website: elisewitt.com

Elise Witt is a singer songwriter based in Atlanta, Georgia. She was born in Switzerland and raised in North Carolina.

Witt has performed in a range of venues, including Carnegie Hall in New York City and Bluebird Café in Nashville. She has been a member of the Atlanta Symphony Orchestra Chorus and chamber chorus for 20 years. She has studied improvisation and currently is part of a 16-voice ensemble.

Elise Witt performed and has taught at Carnegie Hall, Lincoln Center, the Falcon Ridge Folk Festival and Clearwater Hudson River Revival, Italy and in schools around the United States. In 1995, she represented the state of Georgia at the Kennedy Center's 25th Anniversary Celebration. In 2000, she was chosen as one of 120 residency artists nationwide for "America Creates for the Millennium."

Witt is currently Director of Music Programs for the Global Village Project, a DeKalb County middle school for refugee girls.
