= Connecticut Mastery Test =

Standardized test in Connecticut, United States

The Connecticut Mastery Test, or CMT, is a test administered to students in grades 3 through 8 in Connecticut. The CMT was first administered in 1985, in response to the Reagan administration's education report A Nation at Risk. The CMT covers mathematics, reading comprehension, writing, and science (science was first included in March 2008). The other major standardized test in Connecticut is the Connecticut Academic Performance Test, or CAPT, which is given in grade 10. Until the 2005–2006 school year, the CMT was administered in the fall; now it is given in the spring.

The CMT is graded on a scale from 1 to 5 in each area, on this scale:

- 5 - "Advanced"
- 4 - "Goal"
- 3 - "Proficient"
- 2 - "Basic"
- 1 - "Below basic."

== Structure ==
=== Editing and Revising ===
This is the first portion of the CMT writing test. Students read passages that contain numerous spelling and grammar errors. They answer multiple choice questions to correct the errors. This test is 60 minutes long and it is scored by a computer.

=== Direct Assessment of Writing ===
In this test, students have 45 minutes to write a paper on a designated topic. In third and fourth grade, the essay is a fictional narrative; in fifth and sixth it is an expository piece; in seventh and eighth grade it is a persuasive essay. It is scored by two trained professionals. Each reader scores it from 1 to 6. The two scores are combined to make one total score; the state target goal is 8.0 out of 12.

=== Degrees of Reading Power ===
Also known as the DRP, this is the first portion of the reading section. Students must read through passages which have blanks in them. They must then choose the correct answer to fill in the blank from a list of options.There are 49 questions (seven questions per passage, seven passages) in this section. The questions gradually get harder. The test is 45 minutes long and is scored by a machine.

=== Reading Comprehension ===
Students read four passages and answer questions about them. There are multiple choice questions, as well as written responses in which the students are given lines to write their answers on. These questions often involve personal connections, the reader's opinion on a topic, and other questions that do not have a definite correct answer. The multiple choice questions are machine-scored, while the written responses are scored by professional readers who score each question with a 0, 1, or 2. The test is divided into two sessions (two passages, 15 questions per session). Each session is 45 minutes long.

=== Mathematics ===
In grades three and four, there are two test sessions, and in grades five through eight there are three. Each test session is 60 minutes long.

The test consists of three formats: multiple choice, open-ended, and grid-in.

- For multiple choice questions, students are provided with four possible answers.
- Open-ended questions require students to explain and show how they got to an answer. There are different rubrics used for scoring depending on the type of open-ended question.
- Grid-in questions (grades five through eight only) require students to write their numerical response in boxes and then fill in corresponding bubbles below each number. All scores are reported by strand, of which there are 25.

== See also ==
- Education in the United States
