= Cold metal transfer =

Welding method usually performed by a welding robot

Cold metal transfer (CMT) is a welding method that is usually performed by a welding robot. The CMT machine detects a short circuit which sends a signal that retracts the welding filler material, giving the weld time to cool before each drop is placed. This leaves a smooth weld that is stronger than that of a hotter weld. This works well on thin metal that is prone to warping and the weld burning through the material. This type of welding is more efficient than other GMAW methods when the metal is thinner than 10mm, anything thicker and the expense begins to overcome traditional welding. Welding wire is fed through the system that is controlled by a computer, the computer adjusts things such as wire feed, welding speed, and amps going through the wire. This allows precise welding of materials like steel and aluminum, with very little slag and spatter, resulting in a cleaner finish weld.

== Definition ==
CMT is a subset of gas metal arc welding. It works by reducing the weld current and retracting the weld wire when detecting a short circuit, resulting in a drop-by-drop deposit of weld material. Developed for thin materials, CMT requires strict control of weld parameters.

== History ==
CMT was originally intended for joining sheet metal in the automotive industry, but has expanded to thicker materials.

== Application ==
Cold metal transfer is used to weld different types of metal with various thicknesses. This low voltage, low heat welding works well on thin sheet metal. It is also being used for thicker material where the integrity of the weld is important. When metal is overheated it affects its structural properties; CMT welding keeps the heat to a minimum, resulting in little change to the structure of the metal, and a stronger weld. Thin metal has a greater possibility of distorting when heated. During traditional GMAW welding, heat sinks or other heat protection had to be used to prevent the warping of the metal. Heat protection is not needed during the CMT process. CMT has a wide variety of applications in various industries such as small engine, automotive, and marine.

== Specifications ==
Applications	Energy	Travel speed	Gas
Sheet metal			
Pipeline	0.47 to 0.75 kJ/mm	350 – 406 mm/min	Argon/CO_{2}
