= United States Committee on the Marine Transportation System =

Logo of the U.S. Committee on the Marine Transportation System

The United States Committee on the Marine Transportation System (CMTS) is an inter-agency committee authorized by the United States Coast Guard and the Maritime Transportation Act of 2012 (Pub.L. 112-213, Sec. 310, § 55502) to coordinate policies affecting the U.S. Marine Transportation System (MTS).

The CMTS is a Federal Cabinet-level, inter-departmental committee chaired by the United States Secretary of Transportation, with members including Secretaries and Administrators of 14 Departments and Independent Government Agencies, along with representatives from the Executive Office of the President. The CMTS is authorized to assess the adequacy of the MTS, promote the integration of the MTS with other modes of transportation and the marine environment, and coordinate, improve the coordination of, and make recommendations regarding federal policies that impact the MTS.

The MTS is a network of ports, waterways, navigable channels, marine terminals, inter-modal connections that allow for the transportation of people and goods to, from, and on the water. The MTS includes 25,000 miles of navigable channels, 361 commercial ports, 50,000 Federal ATONs, 20,000 bridges, the Great Lakes and St. Lawrence Seaway.

== Organization ==
=== Cabinet-level Committee ===
==== Chair ====
- Secretary of Transportation

==== Members ====
- Administrator of the Environmental Protection Agency
- Advisor to the President on National Security
- Assistant to the President for Domestic Policy
- Assistant to the President for Economic Policy
- Assistant to the President for Homeland Security and Counterterrorism
- Assistant to the President for Science and Technology Policy
- Attorney General
- Chairman of the Joint Chiefs of Staff
- Chairman of the Marine Mammal Commission
- Chairman of the National Transportation Safety Board
- Council on Environmental Quality Chair
- Director, National Maritime Intelligence-Integration Office
- Director of the Office of Management and Budget
- Secretary of Agriculture
- Secretary of Commerce
- Secretary of Defense
- Secretary of Energy
- Secretary of Homeland Security
- Secretary of (the) Interior
- Secretary of Labor
- Secretary of (the) Treasury

=== Coordinating Board ===
- Bureau of Safety and Environmental Enforcement
- Environmental Protection Agency
- Federal Maritime Commission
- Great Lakes St. Lawrence Seaway Development Corporation
- International Trade Administration
- Marine Mammal Commission
- Maritime Administration
- National Maritime Intelligence-Integration Office
- National Oceanic and Atmospheric Administration
- National Security Council
- National Transportation Safety Board
- Oceanographer of the Navy
- Office of Management and Budget
- Office of Science and Technology Policy
- Office of Trade and Manufacturing Policy
- U.S. Army Corps of Engineers
- U.S. Coast Guard
- U.S. Department of Agriculture
- U.S. Department of Energy
- U.S. Department of Homeland Security
- U.S. Department of Justice
- U.S. Department of Labor
- U.S. Department of State
- U.S. Department of the Treasury
- U.S. Department of Transportation
- U.S. Merchant Marine Academy

=== CMTS Integrated Action Teams and Task Teams ===
- U.S. Arctic Marine Shipping Integrated Action Team
- Maritime Data Integrated Action Team
- Infrastructure and Supply Chain Integrated Action Team
- MTS Resilience Integrated Action Team
- MTS Innovative Science and Technology Integrated Action Team
- Future of Navigation Integrated Action Team
- Military to Mariner Task Team
- COVID-19 Working Group
