= Graffiti the World =

Studio album by Rehab
- Released: July 15, 2005
- Recorded: 2004–2005, 2008
- Genre: Southern hip-hop; alternative rock
- Length: 45:29; 47:38 (re-release)
- Label: Attica Sound/Redeye; Universal Republic (re-release)
- Producer: Mike Hartnett; Danny "Boone" Alexander; Billy Hume; Hano Leathers; Foz

Rehab chronology
Cuz We Can (2002)	Graffiti the World (2005)	Sittin' at a Bar (2008)

Singles from Graffiti the World
- 1. "Bartender Song (Sittin' at a Bar)" Released: May 27, 2008

Professional ratings
Review scores
Source	Rating
AllMusic	2.5/5 stars
Alternative Addiction	3/5 stars
RapReviews	7/10
PopMatters	3/10 stars

Graffiti the World is the fourth studio album by American band Rehab. It was originally released on July 15, 2005, for Attica Sound with distribution via Redeye Distribution, and re-released on the same day in 2008 through Universal Republic Records. It is the group's first album with a new sound and line-up after the departure of Jason Brooks 'Buford'.

== Track listings ==
2005 tracklist
No.	Title	Producer(s)	Length
1.	"Wht Do U Wnt Frm Me"	Mike Hartnett	3:37
2.	"Bump"	Mike Hartnett; Danny "Boone" Alexander	3:15
3.	"Chest Pain"	Billy Hume	3:03
4.	"Red Water"	Billy Hume	5:19
5.	"Graffiti the World"	Billy Hume	4:39
6.	"Last Tattoo"	Mike Hartnett; Danny "Boone" Alexander	3:42
7.	"Bottles & Cans"	Danny "Boone" Alexander; Wayne Scheiner; Hano Leathers	2:47
8.	"We Live"	Mike Hartnett; Hano Leathers; Foz	3:14
9.	"This Town"	Billy Hume	4:07
10.	"Walk Away"	Mike Hartnett	3:40
11.	"This I Know"	Mike Hartnett	4:23
12.	"Running Out of Time"	Mike Hartnett; Danny "Boone" Alexander; Hano Leathers	3:43
Total length:			45:29

2008 tracklist
No.	Title	Length
1.	"Let 'Em Know"	3:23
2.	"Bump"	3:16
3.	"Chest Pain"	3:03
4.	"Graffiti the World"	4:36
5.	"Bartender Song (Sittin' at a Bar)"	3:49
6.	"Last Tattoo"	3:34
7.	"1980"	3:20
8.	"Bottles & Cans"	2:47
9.	"Lawnchair High"	3:19
10.	"This Town"	4:07
11.	"Red Water"	5:19
12.	"Walk Away"	3:39
13.	"We Live"	3:21
Total length:		47:38

== Personnel ==
- Danny "Boone" Alexander – vocals, producer
- David "Demun" Jones – vocals on "This I Know"
- Denny "Steaknife" Campbell – vocals on "Let' Em Know" & "Lawn Chair High"
- William L. Whedbee – background vocals, guitar, producer, mixing
- Michael D. Hartnett – guitar, producer
- Fazal "Foz" Syed – guitar
- Hano Leathers – bass guitar
- Chris Hood – drums
- Tom Knight – drums
- Julius Speed – keyboards
- Josh Butler – mixing
- Kenneth Mount – mixing
- Mark Eckard – engineering
- Joel Mullis – engineering
- Larry "Jazz" Anthony – mastering
- Wayne Scheiner – producer
- Farshid Arshid – executive producer
- Ronnie Lewis – layout design

== Charts ==
Chart (2008)	Peak position
US Billboard 200	90
US Top Alternative Albums (Billboard)	24
US Heatseekers Albums (Billboard)	1
