= The Southern Gothic =

American country and rock music group

- Also known as: Connor Christian & the Morningstar Revival; Connor Christian & Southern Gothic
- Origin: Atlanta, Georgia
- Genres: Country, southern rock
- Years active: 2007-present
- Labels: Perfect Symmetry; Vintage Earth; Rocket Science
- Members: Connor Christian; Shawn Thacker; Yannie Reynecke; Quinn Loggins
- Past members: Nick Edelstein; Dan Emmett; Joe Abramson; Elena Martin; Faye Petree; Rashad Abu-Azzam; Jeff Spirko
- Website: www.thesoutherngothicmusic.com

The Southern Gothic is an American music group with an Americana sound that leans heavily on country and southern rock roots. Known to fans as SoGo, originally from Atlanta, now based in Nashville, Tennessee The Southern Gothic is composed of Connor Christian, Shawn Thacker, Yannie Reynecke and Quinn Loggins.

The group was formed in 2007 as Connor Christian & the Morningstar Revival. Under the name "Connor Christian & Southern Gothic," they released 2 studio albums. The 2013 album New Hometown sold 5,000 copies in its first week of release, debuting in the Top 20 of the Billboard Top Country Albums chart and at number one on the Top Heatseekers chart. In January 2014, the band recorded a double-live album entitled "Shuffle & Stomp," as well as its first full-length concert DVD entitled "CCSG Live in Atlanta."

In 2015, the band re-branded as "The Southern Gothic" and relocated to Nashville to record a new album. After taking a four-year hiatus to work on individual projects, the band reformed in late 2018 and released a stand-alone single, "Let it Ride," on April 19, 2019. Though pushed back several times due to Covid, their newest single and EP ("Past Midnight" and "Burnin' Moonlight" respectively), was released on December 4, 2020.

== Discography ==
=== Studio albums ===
| Title | Album details | Peak chart positions | | | |
| Title | Album details | US Country | US | US Heat | US Indie |
|---|---|---|---|---|---|
| A Southern Gothic | Release date: February 16, 2007; Label: Perfect Symmetry | — | — | — | — |
| 90 Proof Lullabies | Release date: March 10, 2009; Label: Vintage Earth | — | — | — | — |
| New Hometown | Release date: February 12, 2013; Label: Rocket Science | 17 | 127 | 1 | 18 |
| Burnin' Moonlight | Release date: Dec 4, 2020 | - | - | - | - |
"—" denotes releases that did not chart

=== Live albums ===
| Title | Album details | Peak chart positions | | | |
| Title | Album details | US Country | US | US Heat | US Indie |
|---|---|---|---|---|---|
| Shuffle & Stomp | Release date: June 10, 2014 | — | — | — | — |
"—" denotes releases that did not chart

=== Music videos ===
| Year | Video | Director |
|---|---|---|
| 2010 | "Sunday Suit" | Jonathan Barbee |
| 2013 | "Sheets Down" | Mil Cannon |
| 2014 | "16 Bars" | Mil Cannon |
| 2020 | "Past Midnight" | Mil Cannon |
