= Welcome Home (Rehab album) =

Studio album by Rehab
- Released: September 7, 2010
- Genre: Rock; country; pop
- Length: 37:19
- Label: Universal Republic

Rehab chronology
Graffiti the World (2008)	Welcome Home (2010)	Fixtape (2010)

Welcome Home is the fifth studio album by Rehab. With the exception of the rap-based songs "#1" and "Rideout Chick", the album consists largely of acoustic rock and "country-fried pop". It is Rehab's first album not to receive a Parental Advisory sticker.

== Track listing ==
No.	Title	Length
1.	"#1"	3:46
2.	"Oh My"	3:11
3.	"Lightning Bolts"	3:42
4.	"Decisions"	3:31
5.	"Welcome Home"	3:51
6.	"Ole Friends"	2:36
7.	"Some People"	3:00
8.	"Everybody Everywhere"	3:44
9.	"Talk About"	3:19
10.	"Rideout Chick"	3:24
11.	"I Won't Back Down^{[1]}"	3:25
