= Laid Back (album) =

Studio album by Gregg Allman
- Released: October 1973
- Recorded: March 1973
- Studio: Capricorn Sound Studios, (Macon, Georgia); Record Plant, (New York City)
- Genre: Southern rock; blues rock
- Length: 35:27
- Label: Capricorn
- Producer: Johnny Sandlin; Gregg Allman

Gregg Allman chronology
Laid Back (1973)	The Gregg Allman Tour (1974)

Singles from Laid Back
- 1. "Midnight Rider" Released: December 1973; 2. "Don't Mess Up a Good Thing" Released: March 1974

Laid Back is the debut solo studio album by American singer-songwriter Gregg Allman, released in October 1973 by Capricorn Records. Allman, best known as the vocalist/lyricist/organist of the Allman Brothers Band, first began considering a solo career after internal disagreements with that group. He developed the album as a small creative outlet wherein he would assume full control, and he co-produced the album alongside Johnny Sandlin. Laid Back was largely recorded in March 1973 at Capricorn Sound Studios in Macon, Georgia, with additional recording and mixing taking place at the Record Plant by Manhattan Recording Engineer, Jim Reeves in New York City.

The album explores Allman's varying influences, including rhythm and blues and soul music. It consists of several cover songs, originals, and a traditional hymn, and contains performances from a host of musicians, most notably Scott Boyer and Tommy Talton on guitars, Chuck Leavell on piano, Charlie Hayward on bass guitar, and Bill Stewart on drums. The album was created while Allman also worked on Brothers and Sisters, the fourth Allman Brothers album. The album title was a studio term Allman coined for relaxing a song's intensity. The album cover was painted by Abdul Mati Klarwein.

Upon its release, Laid Back received positive reviews from music critics, and it peaked at number 13 on Billboard's Top LPs & Tape chart. To support the album, Allman embarked on an ambitious tour, consisting of a full band and an entire string orchestra. Two singles were released to promote the record, with lead single "Midnight Rider" becoming a top 20 hit in the U.S. and Canada. It was certified gold by the Recording Industry Association of America (RIAA) in 1974 for shipping 500,000 copies in the U.S., making it one of Allman's best-selling albums.

== Background ==
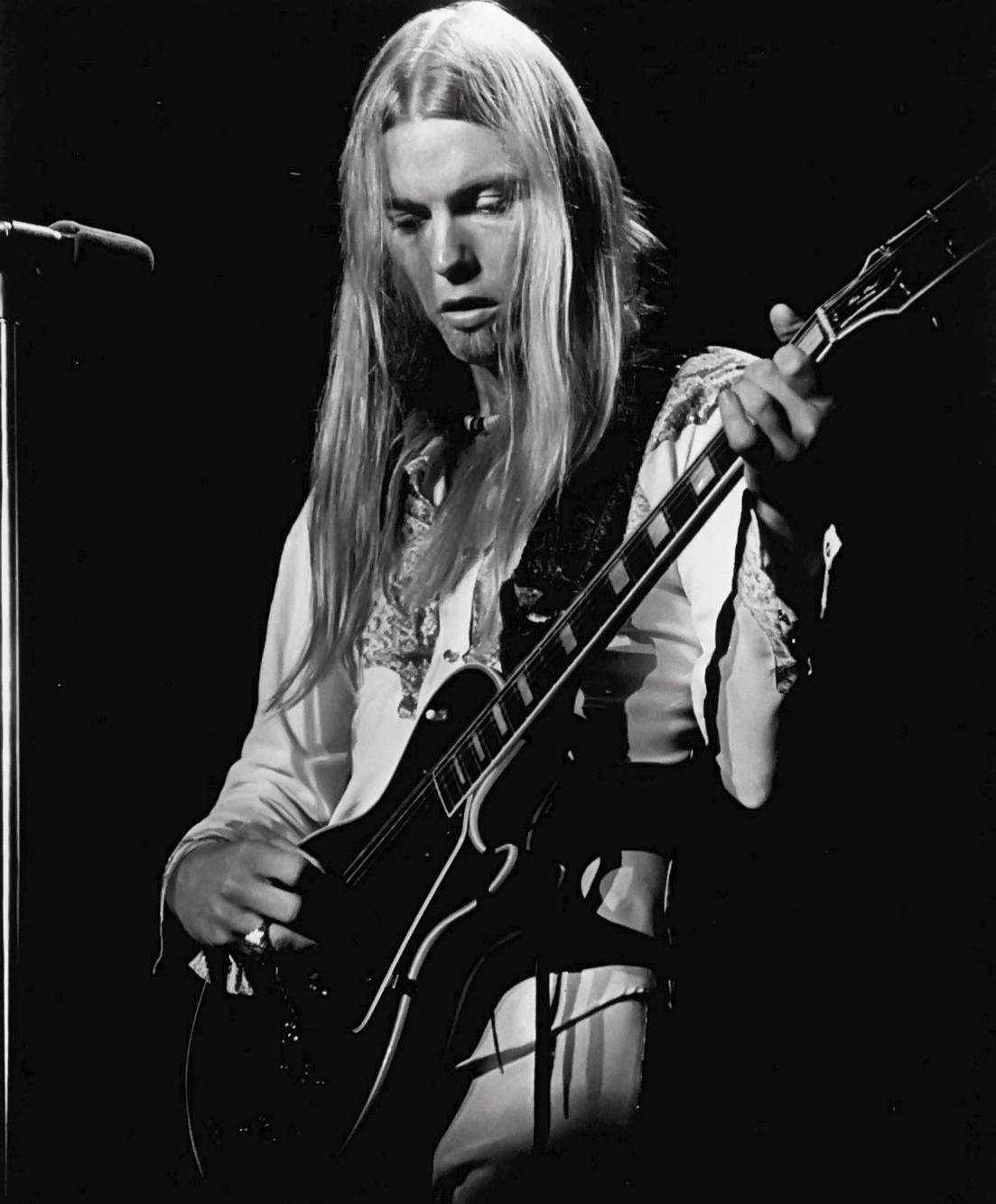
Gregg Allman in 1975.

Gregg Allman first began exploring music during his teen years in Daytona Beach, Florida. He and his brother, Duane Allman, founded their first band, the Allman Joys, in the mid-1960s. That group evolved into the Hour Glass, which recorded two albums for Liberty Records between 1967 and 1968. Subsequently, the duo founded the Allman Brothers Band, which grew in fame in the early 1970s due to their live shows, which combined traditional electric blues, jazz-style improvisation and self-penned instrumentals. Their 1971 live album At Fillmore East represented a commercial and artistic breakthrough. Duane Allman was killed in a motorcycle crash later that year, but the band continued on, recording 1972's Eat a Peach, a hybrid live/studio album that became an even greater success, shipping gold and peaking at number four on Billboard's Top 200 Pop Albums chart.

The death of his brother profoundly impacted Allman, who had trouble coping with the loss. According to band historian John Lynskey, his "melancholy attitude, combined with a yearning to do something different musically, lead him to actively pursue the notion of putting out a record of his own." He first enlisted the help of friend Deering Howe, whom he and the Brothers would often visit when performing in New York. Howe was an heir to his family's International Harvester fortune, which allowed him the time to become a part of "the fast crowd that hung out with rock stars such as Jimi Hendrix [and] Mick Jagger," according to Jean Dubail of the South Florida Sun-Sentinel. He agreed to financially assist Allman on recording demos to free him from what he dubbed "the bullshit with Capricorn Records in Macon". The duo first flew to Miami's Criteria Studios, where they recorded 3–4 tracks in May 1972. They later decamped to Advantage Street Studios in New York, where they recorded several more in July 1972. Allman was heavily inebriated, and the sessions were largely difficult, according to Howe.

During that same period, the Allman Brothers Band began rehearsals at Capricorn Studios for what would become their fourth studio album, Brothers and Sisters. Allman brought the band the song "Queen of Hearts", which he had worked on for, by that point, a year and a half. He was inebriated at the time, and the members would not consider the song. "That song just ain't saying nothing," his bandmates told him. Later that night, he returned to Capricorn to work alone. He worked for forty-two hours, slept for six, and returned for a final session that wound up lasting a further twenty-eight hours. "Mentally and physically exhausted," he was unhappy with his output, and discarded the tape reels in a trash can, hoping to set them aflame. Johnny Sandlin—who was serving as producer of Brothers and Sisters, and was a longtime friend—walked in and convinced Allman to start over. Sandlin offered to produce Allman's solo effort, and Allman asked Sandlin to assemble a new team of musicians to help record the LP.

== Recording and production ==
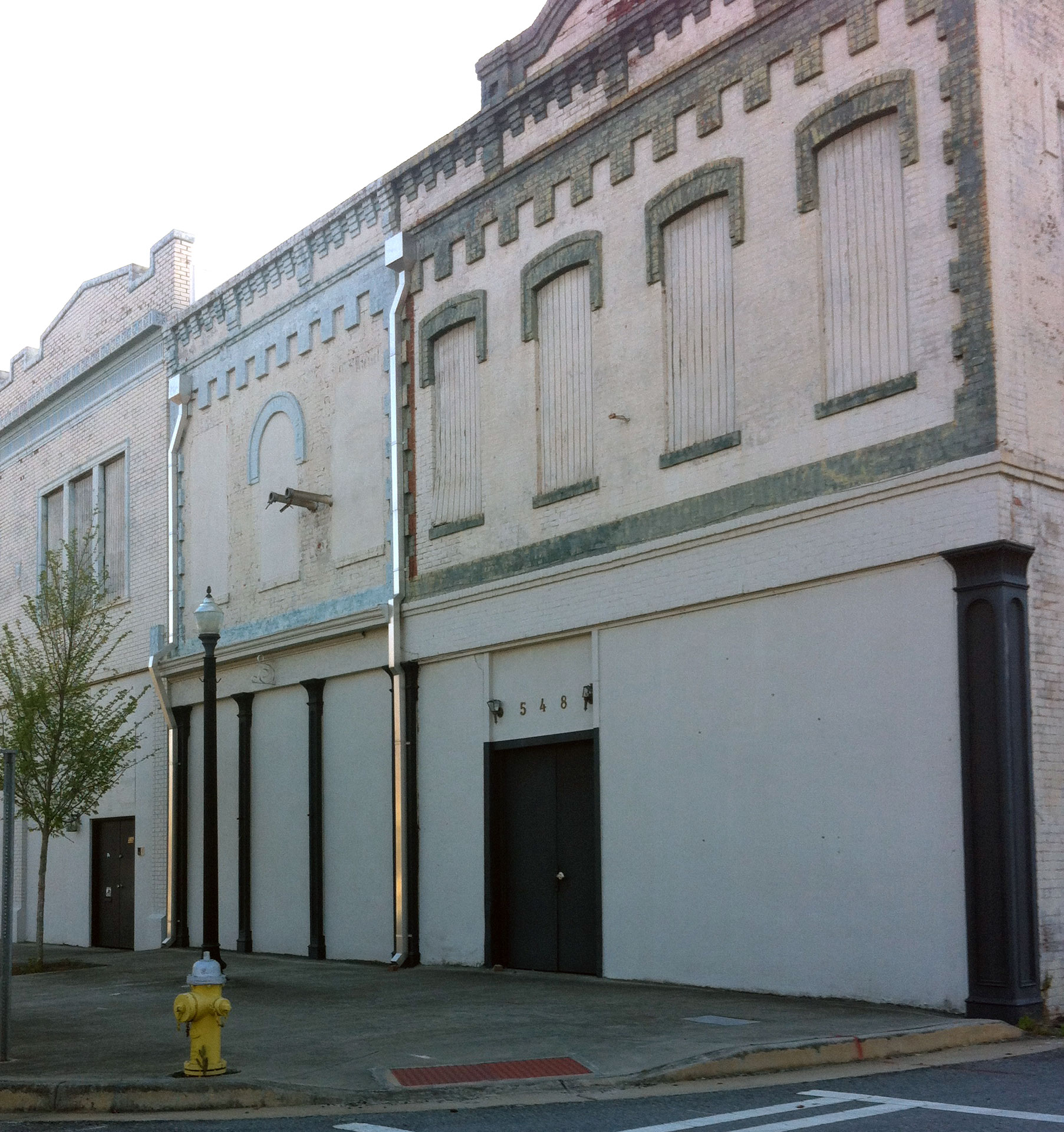
Laid Back was largely recorded in March 1973 at Capricorn Sound Studios in Macon, Georgia

Laid Back was further developed throughout late 1972, with Allman and Sandlin continuing to record between September and December. Work stalled on Laid Back as production commenced on Brothers and Sisters, though the two were worked on roughly concurrently. Work began in earnest in March 1973, after Brothers and Sisters was completed.

Sandlin helped hire various session musicians to perform on the album, including Bill Stewart on drums and Charlie Hayward on bass guitar. David Brown also played bass, as did Sandlin on several songs. Scott Boyer and Tommy Talton, also of the band Cowboy, play guitar on the LP and were a large influence on its sound. Boyer contributes pedal steel guitar on several songs, notably "These Days", with Talton adding slide and acoustic guitar; in addition, both sang backing harmonies on many tracks.

Allman likened the album's presence to a mistress, noting that the rest of the band were not thrilled. It slowed down progress on their own album, and it created tension between the group, particularly between Allman and guitarist Dickey Betts. Nevertheless, several Allman Brothers members made appearances on Laid Back, including Jaimoe, who provided congas, and Chuck Leavell, a new addition to the Brothers, who added piano. Leavell stayed in Macon after leaving Dr. John's band, and found himself contributing to both albums. Allman felt Leavell's style of playing fit the album perfectly: "He'd give you exactly what you wanted, without any questions, and if he embellished on a song, he made it even better."

Unlike with the Brothers, none of the songs were performed live—or "road-tested"—before their release, with the album's eight songs being developed and arranged in the studio. The experience recording the album was a pleasurable one, according to all involved. Talton, reflecting in 2019, said the chemistry between the musicians were at a high, which he attributed to the fact that he, Boyer, and Leavell lived together during production. "That camaraderie created a bond [...] The studio became our playground, our clubhouse." Talton credited Sandlin with creating an open, collaborative environment, noting that the musicians were free to enter the control room and make suggestions. Leavell expounded upon the studio atmosphere in 2019:

I recall just how happy everyone was in the studio. Gregg especially seemed very relieved and pleased to be doing something different to keep his mind off the loss of his brother, as well as the challenges the Allman Brothers had. Johnny did a masterful job in helping Gregg guiding things, taking Gregg's suggestions and making them happen, while also encouraging us to be ourselves and contribute in our own way.

== Composition ==
Musically, Laid Back focuses on heartfelt, melancholy ballads; Leavell said the agenda was to create a "more mellow, less fierce" album in comparison to the Allman Brothers Band. "If I had to boil it down to one word, I would say 'melodic.' This was a more melodic record," he said in 2019. Talton said that none of the musicians were focused on making the album sonically different from Allman's main project, it simply happened. Opening the album is a version of "Midnight Rider", which Allman first composed and recorded for the Allman Brothers Band's second album, Idlewild South in 1970. For the new recording, Allman aimed for a "swamp"-like atmosphere, "with the image of moss hanging off the trees, alligators and fog, darkness, [and] witches," he later wrote. Boyer and Allman came up with the creeping acoustic guitar intro, which sets the tone for the rest of the track.

"Queen of Hearts", the song that prompted Allman to develop the album, follows with an opening guitar line courtesy of guest guitarist Buzz Feiten. The song shifts to the 11/8 time signature after the second verse, which was unintentional: "I didn't know I had written a song in 11/8 until someone told me!" Allman said in 1997. "Queen of Hearts" also features a prominent saxophone accompaniment from David "Fathead" Newman. "Please Call Home" was first recorded on Idlewild South. Allman reinterprets the song for Laid Back, using a gospel choir and Talton's guitar playing. Allman performs his signature Hammond B3 on the track. The song is followed by "Don't Mess Up a Good Thing", written by songwriter and saxophonist Oliver Sain and first recorded by Fontella Bass and Bobby McClure, who had a top five hit with it on the R&B charts in 1964. John Lynskey writes that the tune "brings a rollicking sense of New Orleans exuberance to [the album]." Newman again performs saxophone on the track, which was by all accounts a simple one to record for the team. "That was just flat-out fun to cut; we all had a blast on that one," Leavell remembered.

"These Days" opens side two of the original LP. It was written by singer-songwriter Jackson Browne, whom Allman and his brother shared a home with during their time living in Los Angeles in the late 1960s. Allman then became enamored with Browne's songwriting, and his rendition of "These Days" includes a plaintive performance from Boyer on four-pedal Gibson steel guitar. Allman was initially worried it might sound too country, but was satisfied with Boyer's playing. Browne was impressed with Allman's cover; he later wrote that Allman "made that song twice as good as it was before he sang it." "Multi-Colored Lady" begins with a delicate finger-picked guitar intro, leading into a narrative about a "lonely, heartbroken young woman." Talton viewed it to be the epitome of the album's sound.

Boyer wrote the song "All My Friends", which was originally released on Cowboy's 1971 album 5'll Getcha Ten. Allman and his bandmates had been renting a home in Macon they dubbed the Big House for several years, and the LP was a favorite of theirs. He double-tracked himself performing lead and harmony vocals for the song. "I've always loved the Everly Brothers style of harmony, but I didn't want it to just follow the traditional 1–3–5 pattern," he recalled. Talton plays a dual guitar solo, which was Sandlin's idea. The LP closes with the popular Christian hymn, "Will the Circle Be Unbroken?". Allman and Sandlin are credited with re-arranging the piece, which includes a choir of Macon church singers of the time, as well as a coterie of Capricorn staff and musicians. Lynskey writes that the chorus of voices gives the track a "family-fueled, Southern choir feeling."

== Artwork and title ==
The album cover was painted by Abdul Mati Klarwein, best known for creating the artwork to Miles Davis's Bitches Brew (1970). Allman was introduced to him through a friend. Allman did not have the time to come sit for the painting, so Klarwein worked with a photograph. Allman commented on the cover in his 2012 memoir, My Cross to Bear: "I loved [it]; I thought it turned out perfect. It cost me $1,500 back then, but today it would like $50,000, maybe even $150,000." In his later years, Allman would attempt to purchase the original painting used for the album sleeve, but was unable to afford to. Allman's girlfriend at the time (and later wife) Janice Blair appears on the album's sleeve, riding a horse. The album's title was an inside reference to a studio term Allman coined for when a song had too much energy and needed to be more relaxed, or "laid back." He spoke more on the term in his later autobiography, My Cross to Bear:

I've always pictured it this way: go at it as if you were Mr. Natural, that R. Crumb character. Mr. Natural's feet always got to where he was going before his head did, so "laid back" means don't dive in there headfirst. When I got the guys together who were going to play on my record, I told them to picture a Freak Brother, and they laughed for about half an hour, but they got it.

== Reception ==
Professional ratings
Review scores
Source	Rating
AllMusic	4.5/5 stars
Christgau's Record Guide	B
Creem	C+
Rolling Stone Album Guide	3/5 stars

Reviewing the album for Rolling Stone, Tony Glover said "Laid Back isn't quite what you'd expect from Gregg's work with the Brothers Band. Instead, it's a moody LP, often tinged with grandeur, and maybe just a little too rich and one-colored in spots. But on the whole, a moving look at another side of a finely charismatic singer/writer." Billboard named it a "Spotlight" pick among its Top Album Picks in November 1973, with the reviewer deeming it "a masterpiece of a set ... featuring exceptional displays of vocal and instrumental talent in many musical areas." Robert Christgau was less enthusiastic in Creem, saying Allman "proves that drawling slowly isn't the same as singing soulfully."

In Christgau's Record Guide: Rock Albums of the Seventies (1981), Christgau reassessed the album more favorably; while still believing Allman sounded melancholy because of "a limited formal imagination", he conceded that the singer "puts a lot into 'These Days' and 'Midnight Rider,' and that the reason you can listen to such originals as "Please Call Home" and "Multicolored Lady" isn't the writing." AllMusic later said: "Recorded in the same year as the Brothers and Sisters album, this solo debut release is a beautiful amalgam of R&B, folk, and gospel sounds, with the best singing on any of Gregg Allman's solo releases." In 2006, Tom Moon of NPR reviewed the album as a part of his "Shadow Classics" series, calling it "amazing stuff, deep and intense yet nowhere near the decibel levels of his work with the [Allman Brothers] band. ... But he's equally compelling — maybe even more so — in a quieter space, when he's less fired up."

== Tour ==
To promote the album, Allman embarked on a nationwide tour with the musicians who helped record the album as his band. Long inspired by Joe Cocker's Mad Dogs & Englishmen (1970), Allman hired a string orchestra to accompany the group. Drawn from the New York Philharmonic, it consisted of three cellos, six violins, and seven violas. The tour lasted one month and performed exclusively in upscale theaters, which Allman requested for the best sound quality possible. He found performing with the orchestra strikingly different than singing with the Allman Brothers Band, having to adjust his normal singing volume to blend better. A live album of material from the tour was released as The Gregg Allman Tour later that year, to help recoup costs for the tour. "I was really pleased with how the tour went. Some nights were better than others, but they were all good," Allman would later recall.

== Legacy ==
Laid Back was Allman's personal favorite solo album he produced; he regarded it as the "pride and joy" of his solo recording career. He and his later manager, Michael Lehman, would often have "warm and meaningful conversations" about the album in the last years of his life. In 2019, Universal announced a two-disc deluxe edition of Laid Back, containing the original album in remastered form, as well as early mixes, alternate versions, and demos. In addition, the original album was reissued on vinyl for the first time in four decades. The deluxe set was produced by Grammy Award-winning producer Bill Levenson, with band historian John P. Lynskey serving as associate producer and providing an essay in the liner notes. Among the highlights on the collection are all of the demos captured by Howe in 1972, including "God Rest His Soul", a tribute to civil rights leader Martin Luther King Jr., and a cover of "Rollin' Stone" by Muddy Waters. The set also includes two songs repurposed on later albums: "Never Knew How Much", a song later re-recorded for the Allman Brothers' 1981 release, Brothers of the Road, and "Song for Adam", another Jackson Browne ballad that Allman reapproached on his final solo effort, 2017's Southern Blood. A bonus live version of "Melissa", captured at the Capitol Theatre in Passaic, New Jersey during the ensuing solo tour in 1974, rounds out the set. "To bring the collection full circle to its inspiration, Allman dedicates the song to Duane," observed David Browne of Rolling Stone. Levenson observed that the chronologically-arranged tracks "told such an interesting story about an artist in distress who is looking for ways to cope."

== Track listing ==
All tracks composed by Gregg Allman; except where indicated

Side one
No.	Title	Writer(s)	Length
1.	"Midnight Rider"	Allman; Robert Kim Payne	4:28
2.	"Queen of Hearts"		6:17
3.	"Please Call Home"		2:48
4.	"Don't Mess Up a Good Thing"	Oliver Sain	4:13

Side two
No.	Title	Writer(s)	Length
5.	"These Days"	Jackson Browne	3:56
6.	"Multi-Colored Lady"		4:55
7.	"All My Friends"	Scott Boyer	4:32
8.	"Will the Circle Be Unbroken"	Traditional; arranged by Allman and Johnny Sandlin	4:49
Total length:			35:27

Deluxe Edition (Disc One)
No.	Title	Writer(s)	Length
9.	"Midnight Rider" (Early Mix)	Allman; Payne	4:29
10.	"Queen of Hearts" (Early Mix)		6:29
11.	"Please Call Home" (Early Mix)		2:58
12.	"Don't Mess Up a Good Thing" (Early Mix)	Sain	4:23
13.	"These Days" (Early Mix)	Browne	3:55
14.	"Multi-Colored Lady" (Early Mix)		4:54
15.	"All My Friends" (Early Mix)	Boyer	4:34
16.	"Will the Circle Be Unbroken" (Early Mix)	Traditional; arranged by Allman and Sandlin	5:14

Deluxe Edition (Disc Two)
No.	Title	Writer(s)	Length
1.	"Never Knew How Much" (Demo)		4:25
2.	"All My Friends" (Demo)	Boyer	4:12
3.	"Please Call Home" (Demo)		3:30
4.	"Queen of Hearts" (Demo)		5:04
5.	"God Rest His Soul" (Solo Guitar & Vocal Demo)		4:58
6.	"Rollin' Stone (Catfish Blues)" (Solo Guitar & Vocal Demo)	Muddy Waters	4:04
7.	"Will the Circle Be Unbroken" (Solo Guitar & Vocal Demo)		3:42
8.	"Multi-Colored Lady" (Solo Guitar & Vocal Demo)		4:40
9.	"These Days" (Solo Guitar, Piano & Vocal Demo)	Browne	2:58
10.	"Shadow Dream Song" (Solo Guitar & Vocal Demo)	Browne	2:27
11.	"Wasted Words"		4:47
12.	"These Days" (Alternate Version with Pedal Steel Guitar)	Browne	3:57
13.	"Multi-Colored Lady" (Rough Mix)		4:53
14.	"These Days" (Rough Mix)	Browne	3:54
15.	"God Rest His Soul" (Rough Mix)		5:33
16.	"Midnight Rider" (Rehearsal)	Allman; Payne	4:51
17.	"Song for Adam / Shadow Dream Song" (Solo Guitar & Vocal Demo)	Browne	4:08
18.	"Melissa" (Live at the Capitol Theatre, 1974)		4:44

== Personnel ==
Credits adapted from the album's liner notes.

Musicians

- Gregg Allman – vocals, Hammond organ, acoustic guitar
- Tommy Talton – acoustic, electric and slide guitars, dobro and tambourine
- Scott Boyer – acoustic, electric and steel guitars, electric piano
- Buzz Feiten – guitar
- Jim Nalls – guitar
- David Brown – bass
- Charlie Hayward – bass
- Johnny Sandlin – bass
- Max Cahn – violin
- Tony Posk – violin
- Paul Hornsby – organ, keyboards, clavinet
- Chuck Leavell – acoustic and electric pianos, vibes
- David "Fathead" Newman – saxophone
- Bill Stewart – drums
- Jai Johanny Johanson – percussion, conga
- Butch Trucks – percussion, cabasa
- Carl Hall – background vocals
- Hilda Harris – background vocals
- Cissy Houston – background vocals
- Emily Houston – background vocals
- June McGruder – background vocals
- Helene Miles – background vocals
- Linda November – background vocals
- Eileen Gilbert – background vocals
- Maretha Stewart – background vocals
- Albertine Robinson – background vocals
- Ed Freeman – strings and horn arrangements, conductor

Production

- Johnny Sandlin – producer, arranger, engineer
- Jim Reeves – engineer
- David Boyd – personal manager
- Ovie Sparks – engineer
- Buddy Thornton – engineer
- George Marino – engineer, mastering
- Abdul Mati Klarwein – album cover art

== Charts ==
Chart (1973–74)	Peak position
Canada Top Albums (RPM)	19
US Top LPs & Tape (Billboard)	13

== Certifications ==
Region	Certification	Certified units/sales
United States (RIAA)	Gold	500,000^{^}
^{^} Shipments figures based on certification alone.
