= 5'll Getcha Ten =

Studio album by Cowboy
- Released: October 1971
- Studio: Various studios: Capricorn Sound Studios; (Macon, Georgia); Muscle Shoals Sound Studios; (Sheffield, Alabama)
- Genre: Country rock; Southern rock
- Length: 43:57
- Label: Capricorn
- Producer: Johnny Sandlin

Cowboy chronology
Reach for the Sky (1970)	5'll Getcha Ten (1971)	Boyer and Talton (1974)

5'll Getcha Ten is the second studio album by American rock band Cowboy. Produced by Johnny Sandlin, the album was released in October 1971 by Capricorn Records. Cowboy formed in 1969 by songwriters Tommy Talton and Scott Boyer. The group was signed to Macon, Georgia-based Capricorn Records by the suggestion of Duane Allman, guitarist and leader of the Allman Brothers Band. Cowboy's first album, Reach for the Sky, was released in 1970, and they supported the Allman Brothers on a national tour between 1970–71. 5'll Getcha Ten was recorded at both Capricorn's studio in Macon and Muscle Shoals Sound Studios in Sheffield, Alabama, as the former was still under construction at the time.

== Background ==
5'll Getcha Ten was released in October 1971. Songwriter and co-founder Talton remembered that while the LP carried the carefree nature of its predecessor, it reflected a maturation in their musicianship, honed while on the road touring. "There was a sense that this is our job now [...] Suddenly we owed money to our record company," he recalled. The group had double the songs necessary for recording a new album, as they were frequently writing. "All My Friends" was inspired by the numerous friends who would stop by the band's rural farmhouse in Macon where they often resided. Gregg Allman would later cover the song on his 1973 album Laid Back. "The Wonder"—a staunch anti-war anthem—was written by John McKenze, who was a friend of the band from their beginnings in Florida. Much of Talton's lyricism comes from a spiritual place, though he has said it held no basis in organized religion. In a later reissue for the album's liner notes, he explains that the song "5'll Getcha Ten" was penned after experiencing a turbulent ride through a storm while on the way to a performance in Atlanta. "It's just my little personal observation about how sometimes we don't pay attention to the magnitude of it all," he said.

"Please Be with Me"—perhaps the band’s best-known song—was written by Boyer in just fifteen minutes in a hotel room late in the recording process. Duane Allman plays dobro on the song. An additional take of the song was later added to Duane Allman: An Anthology (1972), a compilation spanning his career after his death in a motorcycle crash the year prior. Eric Clapton later covered the song as well on his 1974 album 461 Ocean Boulevard.

== Critical reception ==
A reviewer for Billboard praised the "excellent guitar work" present on the LP, commenting, "the songs have a country feeling, but are soft rock in nature." James Chrispell of AllMusic gave the album 4.5 out of 5 stars, writing, "Full of laid-back Southern charm, 5'll Getcha Ten finds Cowboy further exploring the wonders of back-porch music. Strong songwriting and beautiful harmonies abound here."

== Track listing ==
Side one
No.	Title	Writer(s)	Length
1.	"She Carries a Child"	Scott Boyer	3:47
2.	"Hey There Babe"	Tommy Talton	3:20
3.	"5'll Getcha Ten"	Talton	4:56
4.	"The Wonder"	John McKenze	4:01
5.	"Shoestrings"	Boyer; Bill Pillmore	3:25
6.	"Lookin' for You"	Boyer	4:10

Side two
No.	Title	Writer(s)	Length
1.	"Seven Four Tune"	Pillmore	2:44
2.	"Right on Friend"	Boyer	3:36
3.	"All My Friends"	Boyer	4:52
4.	"Innocence Song"	Boyer; Pillmore	1:56
5.	"Please Be with Me"	Boyer	3:42
6.	"What I Want Is You"	Peter Kowalke	3:28

== Personnel ==
Adapted from 5'll Getcha Ten's liner notes.

Cowboy

- Scott Boyer – acoustic guitar, electric guitar, violin, lead vocals
- Tommy Talton – acoustic guitar, lead guitar, lead vocals
- Bill Pillmore – piano, acoustic guitar, fiddle, vocals
- George Clark – bass guitar, vocals
- Pete Kowalke – acoustic guitar, lead guitar, vocals, drums
- Tom Wynn – drums, percussion

Additional musicians

- Chuck Leavell — piano
- Duane Allman — dobro (on "Please Be with Me"), electric guitar (on "Lookin' for You") (Note: In the original album release, Allman was credited by the pseudonym "Fini Crodo". In the album's 2014 reissue, liner notes author Scott Schinder writes that the reason for withholding his name and the nickname "have grown hazy in the years since.")

Production and artwork

- Johnny Sandlin – production, recording engineer, remixing
- Steve Smith – recording engineer
- George Marino – mastering engineer
- Frank Fenter – executive supervision
- B.T. Brandhorst – artwork
- Jimm Roberts – photography
