= Win, Lose or Draw (album) =

Studio album by The Allman Brothers Band
- Released: August 22, 1975
- Recorded: February–July 1975
- Studios: Capricorn Sound (Macon, Georgia); Record Plant (Los Angeles, California)
- Genres: Southern rock; blues rock
- Length: 38:38
- Label: Capricorn
- Producers: Johnny Sandlin; The Allman Brothers Band

The Allman Brothers Band chronology
| Brothers and Sisters (1973) | Win, Lose or Draw (1975) | The Road Goes On Forever (1975) |

Win, Lose or Draw is the fifth studio album and sixth overall by American rock group the Allman Brothers Band. Produced by Johnny Sandlin and the band themselves, it was released on August 22, 1975, in the United States by Capricorn Records. It was the last studio album to feature bassist Lamar Williams and pianist Chuck Leavell.

The band had previously released Brothers and Sisters in 1973 to critical and commercial success. The group toured the following year, attracting large crowds and earning substantial amounts of money, all while internal tension grew among the members. Vocalist and keyboardist Gregg Allman and vocalist and guitarist Dickey Betts released solo albums — The Gregg Allman Tour and Highway Call, both issued that fall — which prompted speculation on the band's unity.

When the band regrouped to work on Win, Lose or Draw, unresolved issues arose in rehearsals. The band was particularly critical of Allman's decision to move to Los Angeles, as well as his tabloid relationship with pop star Cher. With miscommunication and anger at an all-time high, the band pieced together the album over a period of several months, in stark contrast to their usual recording methods. Band members often could not be present in the studio at the same time.

Reviews of the album when it came out were mixed-to-positive, but retrospective reviews have generally been unfavorable. The three selections on the album to receive the most praise have been Allman's title track, Betts' instrumental "High Falls", and a rendition of Muddy Waters' "Can't Lose What You Never Had". The album reached number 5 on the Billboard 200 albums chart.

== Background ==
Brothers and Sisters, the Allman Brothers Band's fourth studio album, was released in August 1973 to substantial commercial success. The band began playing arenas and stadiums almost exclusively as their drug use escalated. By 1974, the band were regularly making $100,000 per show, and were renting the Starship, a customized Boeing 720B used by Led Zeppelin, Deep Purple and the Rolling Stones. The band toured from May to August 1974 for 25 shows, but took a break following its completion due to growing tensions. The band received nearly $150,000 for their spot at the Georgia Jam in June, playing alongside Lynyrd Skynyrd and the Marshall Tucker Band. The band also performed their first overseas concerts, in London and Amsterdam.

In August 1974, Betts released his first solo album, the country-flavored Highway Call. Having wanted to focus on his musical roots, he employed a Southern gospel group, the Rambos, on background vocals, as well as Vassar Clements on fiddle and John Hughey on steel guitar. The album eventually climbed to number 19 on Billboard's Top Pop Albums chart. Meanwhile, Allman began to orchestrate a large solo tour to support his solo album Laid Back, which visited all major cities for 35 shows in the fall. To promote the tour, he decided to release a second solo album, titled The Gregg Allman Tour, a live record composed of recordings made at Carnegie Hall and the Capitol Theatre in New Jersey. For the two musicians, it became somewhat of a sibling rivalry, as rumors began to rise regarding the band's unity. For the tour, Allman brought along Jaimoe and Leavell, which incensed Betts. Drummer Butch Trucks was also offended, as he now had no one to play music with. "The whole thing seemed to frustrate everyone—and it didn't help that we were all taking our turns with whatever drugs happened to be around," said Allman. By the new year, Allman was spending considerable time in Los Angeles and was dating pop star Cher, whom he married in June 1975. Their relationship was oftentimes tabloid news, as Allman became more "famous for being famous" than for his music.

== Recording and production ==
You could just walk into the studio and feel all this tension. There might as well have been an electric sign warning you: "Things could get rough in here."

— Producer Johnny Sandlin

Win, Lose or Draw was recorded from February to July 1975, in sessions that were described as "noncohesive". Tensions had risen to all-time highs within the group. Allman arrived a day late to a rehearsal early on in the recording process, leading the other members to "pummel" him with inquiries about his future with the group and decision to move to Los Angeles, as well as his relationship with Cher. In truth, the tension stemmed not from his relationship or relocation to Los Angeles, but from his and Betts's respective solo albums. The tension was amplified by numerous drugs the band were constantly using. "In the end I probably did spend too much time out in California," Allman said. "But at that point it was easy to run; those sessions were the worst experience I ever had in a studio." Sandlin flew to Los Angeles to record Allman's vocals at the Record Plant. Cher did not appear on the album in any guest role, however.

Sessions typically began at 9pm, and oftentimes barely started because band members would not show up. Previous Allman Brothers albums were cut live to tape, but Win, Lose or Draw primarily found the members piecing it together. While Jaimoe and Leavell seemed to be in high spirits, the rest of the band members' issues "become out in the open in the studio." Rehearsals typically consisted of just Jaimoe, Leavell and bassist Lamar Williams, who started joking that they should form a band named We Three. Even Jaimoe was not present a couple of times, leading Sandlin and Bill Stewart to perform the drums on two tracks, "Louisiana Lou and Three Card Monty John" and "Sweet Mama". The group spent considerable time recording the album's Betts instrumental, "High Falls", named after High Falls State Park north of Macon, so much so that when Trucks was given PCP instead of cocaine at a bar, he had a multiple-hour hallucinogenic nightmare about playing "High Falls".

Allman later wrote that it appeared as though Betts only cared about his songs and instrumentals, and tried to "dictate the entire process." In the spring, Allman fell off his motorcycle and broke his right wrist. Betts used this as ammunition, accusing him of injuring himself on purpose so that the Allman Brothers could not tour. In addition, the relationship between him and Trucks had soured. "We'd taken time off, but that had only exaggerated the problems between our personalities. With each day there was more and more space between us; the Brotherhood was fraying, and there wasn't a damn thing any of us could do to stop it," said Allman.

Sandlin called Win, Lose or Draw the hardest record he ever produced. "It was so weird. It wasn't fun at all. It was rough for me, and it was rough for them. […] It was just sad."

== Artwork ==
The cover, designed by Twiggs Lyndon, depicts an interior shot of a deserted Old West saloon. "A poker table topped with half-empty whiskey bottles, cards, and chips sits front and center, surrounded by six empty chairs representing the then-current members." Likewise, two empty chairs lean against a table in the background, representing past members Duane Allman and Berry Oakley. "I never exactly understood that cover. I've heard a lot of interpretations and each one went deeper and deeper. All I know for sure is it's kind of alarming," said Sandlin. The photograph was actually taken in the former Muhlenbrinks Saloon, in The Underground, in Atlanta.

== Reception ==
Professional ratings
Review scores
| Source | Rating |
|---|---|
| AllMusic | 1.5/5 stars |
| The Atlanta Constitution | (Mixed) |
| The Calgary Herald | (Favorable) |
| Detroit Free Press | (Favorable) |
| Los Angeles Times | (Favorable) |
| New York Daily News | (Mixed) |
| The Philadelphia Inquirer | (Mixed) |
| Rolling Stone | (Favorable) |
| The Rolling Stone Record Guide | 1/5 stars |
| The Rolling Stone Album Guide | 3/5 stars |
| Rough Guide to Rock | (Unfavorable) |
| The Village Voice | C |

It is generally perceived that Win, Lose or Draw was received poorly by critics, or at best got a mixed reception. However reviews upon the release of the album were mixed-to-positive. Tony Glover of Rolling Stone gave it a very favorable review at the time. Robert Hilburn of the Los Angeles Times recommended it for students going back to college and said it would provide the same "many hours of pleasant listening" that Brothers and Sisters had. Hiburn also said that the album showed "how far above most rock bands—in both musical design and execution—the Georgia-based group still is." The Tucson Daily Citizen gave it a favorable review that praised the band's "total technical supremacy" and said that the lengthy "High Falls" was "good swinging-but-always-in-control stuff". The Bergen Record named it as one of the best albums of the year.

Among the less favorable reviews was that of Robert Christgau, who said the record sounded like it was made by a group that was breaking up. The Green Bay Press-Gazette gave it a mixed review, liking a couple of tracks but characterizing most of them as "plodding shadows" of the group's best work. The Minneapolis Star also liked a couple of selections but overall called the album "a disappointingly unimportant effort by an important group." Several critics played on the album's title to say that was their review of it – some selections good, some bad, some indifferent.

Retrospective looks at the album have been less favorable. By the time of the publication of The Rolling Stone Record Guide in 1979, it was rated at only one star. Later editions of the Guide in 1992 and 2004 raised the rating to three stars, but said the record showed the strain on the band during its mid-1970s difficulties. Author Scott Freeman holds the album to be lacking in many respects and writes in his 1996 history of the Allmans that, "The band had spent six months working on the album and, in the end, it sounds like they all just wanted to go home." The 2003 Rough Guide to Rock's appraisal was the most succinct: "slop".

Three selections on the record received the most praise, even from those that thought the album lacking overall. The first was the opening run-through of Muddy Waters' "Can't Lose What You Never Had", with Allman taking on the vocal and a syncopated, driving arrangement from the band that featured Betts' guitar work. Allman had rewritten the lyrics and rearranged the song, making it the Allmans' own, and Freeman writes that "The band plays with as much fury as it had for a long time". The second was Allman's morose interior monologue "Win, Lose or Draw". It revealed the influence that Jackson Browne, a friend dating back to the 1960s, had had on Allman. The third was the 14-minute Betts instrumental "High Falls", which consisted of several interwoven sections that built up and receded. The instrumental had notable contributions from Williams and Leavell.

The album was certified as a gold album, which was a drop-off from the platinum certifications achieved by their several records previous to this. Allman Brothers road manager Willie Perkins has said that sales of the album were somewhat disappointing, and that some dates on the tour associated with the album lost money for the promoters.

== Aftermath ==
The Allman Brothers would dissolve in acrimony the following year 1976 and, a late 1970s reunion attempt notwithstanding, would not reclaim their spot in the American musical pantheon until their successful 1989 reformation.

The band has since looked back at Win, Lose or Draw with mixed perception. "The main problem with Win, Lose or Draw is simply that none of us were really into the music," remarked Trucks. "Everyone was into getting fucked up and fucking. We were into being rock stars and the music became secondary. When we heard the finished music, we were all embarrassed." Allman agreed with this sentiment: "Win, Lose or Draw was a perfect reflection of our situation in 1975. It was basically all over with the Allman Brothers Band."

== Track listing ==
Side one

1. "Can't Lose What You Never Had" (Muddy Waters) – 5:49
2. "Just Another Love Song" (Dickey Betts) – 2:44
3. "Nevertheless" (Gregg Allman) – 3:32
4. "Win, Lose or Draw" (Allman) – 4:45
5. "Louisiana Lou and Three Card Monty John" (Betts) – 3:45

Side two

1. "High Falls" (Betts) – 14:28
2. "Sweet Mama" (Billy Joe Shaver) – 3:32

== Personnel ==
The Allman Brothers Band

- Gregg Allman – organ, Hohner Clavinet, acoustic guitar; lead vocals on "Can't Lose What You Never Had", "Nevertheless", "Win, Lose or Draw"
- Dickey Betts – lead guitar, slide guitar, acoustic guitar; lead vocals on "Just Another Love Song", "Louisiana Lou and Three Card Monty John", "Sweet Mama"
- Chuck Leavell – piano, electric piano, Moog synthesizer, Hohner Clavinet, background vocals
- Lamar Williams – electric bass
- Jaimoe – drums, percussion
- Butch Trucks – drums, congas, percussion, tympani

Additional musicians:

- Johnny Sandlin – acoustic guitar, percussion
- Bill Stewart – percussion

Production:

- Produced by Johnny Sandlin and The Allman Brothers Band
- Engineered by Sam Whiteside
- Assistant Engineer – Carolyn Harriss
- Remixed by Johnny Sandlin, Sam Whiteside and Carolyn Harriss at Capricorn Sound Studios

== Charts ==
| Chart (1975) | Peak position |
|---|---|
| Canada Top Albums/CDs (RPM) | 79 |
| New Zealand Albums (RMNZ) | 14 |
| US Billboard 200 | 5 |

== Certifications ==
| Region | Certification | Certified units/sales |
|---|---|---|
| United States (RIAA) | Gold | 500,000^{^} |
^{^} Shipments figures based on certification alone.
