= September Hase =

American alternative rock band

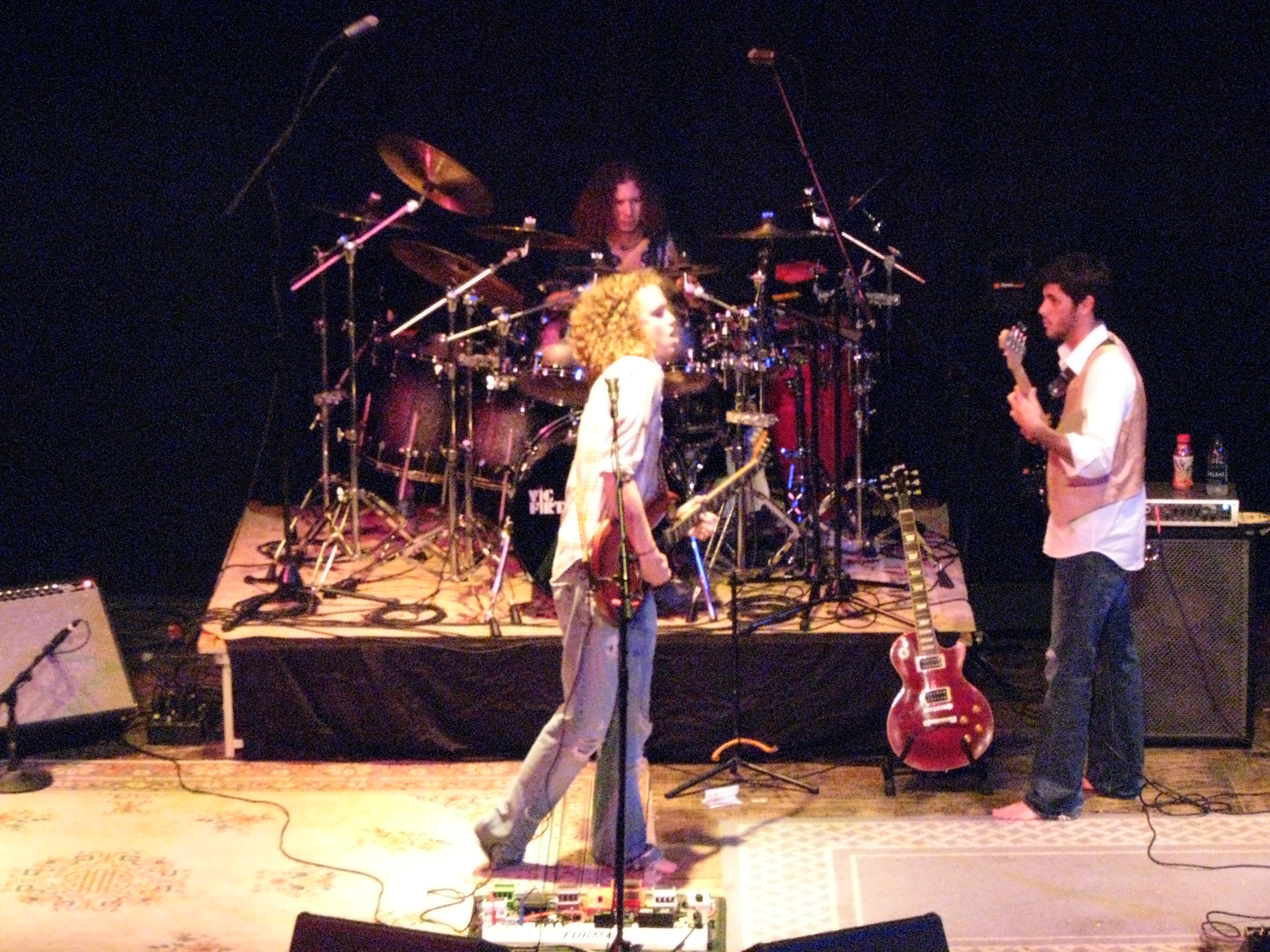
- September Hase performing in August 2008 at the Cox Capital Theatre in Macon, Georgia

Background information
- Also known as: Blackbird
- Origin: Tifton, Georgia, USA
- Genres: Alternative rock
- Years active: 2005–present
- Members: Al Janelle; Adam Smith; Matthew Heller
- Past members: Joel Jones
- Website: www.septemberhase.com

September Hase is an American alternative rock band formed by singer/guitarist Al Janelle in 2005. Janelle formed the group as a three-man project with Adam Smith (bass/vocals) and Matthew Heller (drums) after the dissolution of his high school blues band.

Over the course of the band's career, they appeared in the audition rounds of Fox's The Next Great American Band in 2007. They also signed a one-year management contract with Alan Walden, Georgia Music Hall of Fame inductee and brother of Capricorn Records co-founder Phil Walden in 2008.

The band can currently be found touring the southeastern United States.

== History ==
Between 2002 and 2005, all three founding band members were part of the blues band at Tift County High School in Tifton, Georgia, with Al Janelle playing guitar, Matthew Heller playing drums and percussion, and Adam Smith providing vocals. The blues band was dissolved in 2005 by school officials, and Janelle, Smith, and Heller teamed up to play in a high school talent show in November 2005. Their performance of "Voodoo Child (Slight Return)" was well-received, and the band was born in Janelle's garage. In January 2006, Joel Jones was added as an additional guitar player and vocalist, and the band began working on original material as well as learning covers by artists including Lynyrd Skynyrd, The Allman Brothers Band, Stevie Ray Vaughan, and the John Mayer Trio. In May 2006, the band performed for the first time under the name "Blackbird", playing 10 songs at a free concert in Tifton. They began performing at bars and festivals throughout south Georgia, and enjoyed local popularity when radio stations WQBZ (106.3 FM) in Macon, Georgia and WGLF (104.1 FM) in Tallahassee, Florida played their original songs "Chase the Sun" and "Watch Me (Break Away)" on Sunday nights.

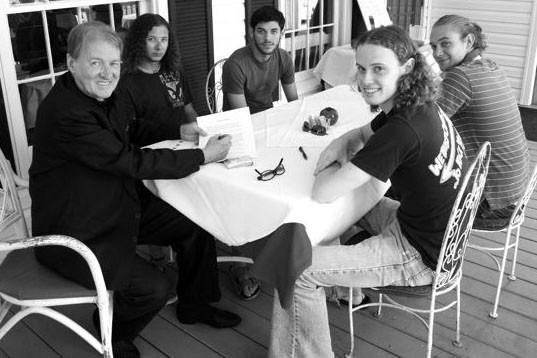
Blackbird with Alan Walden at the signing of their management contract

In August 2007, the band was chosen to audition for producers of Fox's The Next Great American Band reality show. They made it to the top 20 but were not selected as a finalist. Later that year, the band was introduced to future manager Alan Walden during a show at the 550 Blues bar in Macon. Walden, a retired manager of Otis Redding, Lynyrd Skynyrd and Outlaws, had set up an audition showcase for the band with the intent of giving them a few pointers about the music industry. When he heard them play, however, he was blown away by their talent and potential. "The first time I heard them play, I literally cried," Walden later said. "I had tears going down my face." The band signed a one-year management contract with Walden at The Red Tomato in Macon in July 2008.

During a performance at the Cox Capitol Theatre in Macon on August 22, 2008, the band announced that they were changing their band name from "Blackbird" to "September Hase". Also in late 2008, the band relocated to Nashville, Tennessee, where Janelle and Heller are enrolled in college at Belmont University and Middle Tennessee State University respectively. They also amicably parted ways with Jones.

From February 20–22, 2009, the band worked with producer Rodney Mills at Southern Tracks Record Studio in Atlanta to produce a six-song demo that included a cover of "Use Me" by Bill Withers and original songs "Chase the Sun", "Undone", "Moon Mountain", "Follow", and "Love Yourself".

From October 2009 - April 2010, keyboard player Chris Norton performed with the band. He left in May 2010 to tour with Zappa Plays Zappa.

== Musical Styles ==
When Janelle first started the band, the music pulled heavily from blues rock influences such as Jimi Hendrix, Cream, Stevie Ray Vaughan, and the John Mayer Trio, with several songs following the standard twelve-bar blues structure, like their original works "Mistaken for a Fool" and "So Cold". As the band received regional attention and the need for original material grew, the music started to shift from blues rock to a more alternative feel. The band has cited current influences like Incubus, Pearl Jam, Primus and Project Z as contributing to this musical shift. Members also draw inspiration from the long, often-improvised rhythmic grooves of the Jam band genre and such artists as Dave Matthews Band, Moe, Umphrey's McGee, Widespread Panic and Phish.

When September Hase relocated to Nashville, Tennessee, they began to experiment with fusing different musical elements, adding a progressive and experimental edge to their sound, citing influences from bands like The Mars Volta, Tool, and Between the Buried and Me.

== Band members ==
Current

- Al Janelle - lead & rhythm guitars, lead & backing vocals
- Adam Smith - bass guitar, backing vocals
- Matthew Heller - drums, percussion

Former

- Joel Jones - rhythm & lead guitars, backing & lead vocals (2005–2008)

Notable Guests

- John Cravey - live sound engineer & tour manager (2006-2011)
- Matt Spinks - piano & organ (2007-2008)
- Chris Norton - keyboard, backing & lead vocals (2009–2010, left to join Zappa Plays Zappa)

== Discography ==
- Chase the Sun (2006)
- September Hase (2009)
