= Alan Walden =

American music manager and record label founder (1943–2026)

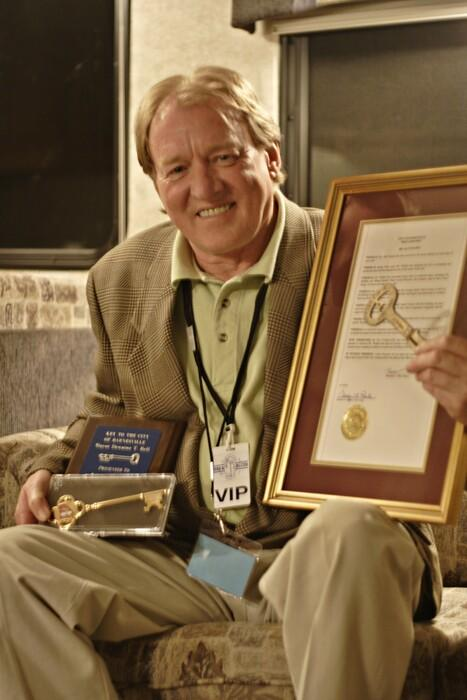

Background information
- Born: May 23, 1943; Macon, Georgia, U.S.
- Died: July 16, 2026 (aged 83) Macon, Georgia, U.S.
- Occupation: Manager
- Spouse: Tosha Walden

Alan Walden (May 23, 1943 – July 16, 2026) was an American manager, publisher, booking agent and promoter.

Walden worked with musical acts including Otis Redding, Sam & Dave, Percy Sledge, Johnnie Taylor, Clarence Carter, Arthur Conley, Al Green, Joe Tex, Z. Z. Hill, Candi Staton, Albert King, William Bell, Eddie Floyd, Etta James, Boz Scaggs, Lynyrd Skynyrd, Outlaws, and September Hase. He opened Redwal Music with his brother Phil Walden in 1965, publishing hit songs like "Respect", "I Can't Turn You Loose", "Sweet Soul Music", "I've Been Loving You Too Long", and "(Sittin' On) The Dock of the Bay". He also co-founded Capricorn Records with his brother and later went on to form Hustler's Inc., a management and publishing company.

== Early life ==
Walden was born on May 23, 1943, in Macon, Georgia, to C. B. and Carolyn Walden. He graduated from Lanier High School in Macon in 1961.

== Early career ==
Walden was a sophomore at Mercer University in Macon when his older brother, Phil, graduated from college and moved to Germany as a lieutenant in the US Army. He was made a full-time partner in Phil Walden Artists and Promotions, the promoting company that his brother had founded, and handled the business affairs of the company until his brother returned in 1965. It was during this time that Walden managed up-and-coming artist Otis Redding and 44 other black recording artists, breaking racial barriers and helping the agency to become one of the largest black artist management companies in the South. In 1965, Redding, Walden, and his brother created Redwal Music, a publishing company to house such songs as "When a Man Loves a Woman", "(Sittin' On) The Dock of the Bay" and "Soul Man". All three of these songs went on to win awards for the number one Rhythm and Blues Single of the Year in Billboard, Cashbox, and Record World.

When Redding died suddenly in 1967, Walden, his brother, and Frank Fenter founded Capricorn Records in Macon, the label that was responsible for bringing The Allman Brothers Band and Southern rock into mainstream America. During his stint with Capricorn, Walden signed blues rock singer and guitarist Boz Scaggs.

== Hustler's Inc. ==
In 1970, Walden resigned from PWA and started Hustler's Inc, a publishing and management company. He auditioned 187 bands before settling on Lynyrd Skynyrd, the 13th band he'd seen. "I changed my lucky number from 5 to 13," Walden later said. Walden worked with Lynyrd Skynyrd until 1974, during which time he published the Southern Rock classics "Freebird", "Sweet Home Alabama", "Gimme Three Steps", and "Simple Man". The line discussing the "money miser" in the song "Cry for the Bad Man" was a reference to Walden. During the time that he was their manager he had been telling the band to save money rather than spend it. Ronnie Van Zant later said it an interview that he regretted writing the song. During his time with Lynyrd Skynyrd, vocalist Ronnie Van Zant introduced Walden to up-and-coming Southern rock band Outlaws. Walden signed The Outlaws shortly before his separation with Lynyrd Skynyrd, and went on to get The Outlaws signed to Arista Records. He helped them achieve three Gold records and one Platinum record between 1974 and 1999, and published their hits "There Goes Another Love Song" and "Green Grass and High Tides".

== Retirement and September Hase ==
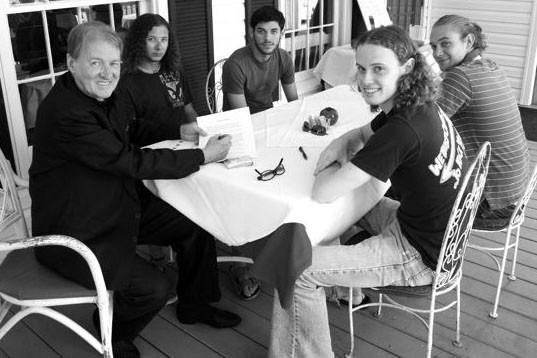
Alan Walden in 2008 with Blackbird (also known as September Hase) at the signing of their management contract

After Outlaws disbanded in 1999, Walden represented southern artists Night Train and Chris Hicks before officially retiring.

In 2003, Walden was inducted into the Georgia Music Hall of Fame for his contributions to music.

== Personal life and death ==
Walden had two children from a previous marriage. He was married to model Tosha Walden and together they had one child.

Walden died in Macon on July 16, 2026, at the age of 83.
