= The Gregg Allman Tour =

Live album by Gregg Allman
- Released: October 1974
- Recorded: April 10, 11, & 14, 1974
- Venue: Carnegie Hall, New York, NY and the Capitol Theatre, Passaic, NJ
- Genre: Southern rock
- Length: 75:38
- Label: Capricorn
- Producer: Johnny Sandlin, Gregg Allman

Gregg Allman chronology
Laid Back (1973)	The Gregg Allman Tour (1974)	Playin' Up a Storm (1977)

Professional ratings
Review scores
Source	Rating
Allmusic	4/5 stars
Rolling Stone Album Guide	3/5 stars

The Gregg Allman Tour is the first live album by Gregg Allman, released in 1974. It was recorded at Carnegie Hall on April 10 and 11, and Capitol Theatre on April 14, 1974. It peaked at number 50 on the Billboard Pop Albums charts in 1974. It was originally released as a double LP.

For this concert, Allman was backed by the band Cowboy, who played two of their own songs. Cowboy was a Capricorn Records label-mate and was Duane Allman's favorite band. Several of its members had already backed Gregg Allman on his debut album the previous year.

The Gregg Allman Tour was re-mastered and re-released on CD in 2001 by Polydor.

At the beginning of the album, Gregg Allman is introduced by Martin Mull.

== Track listing ==
=== Side 1 ===
1. "Don't Mess Up a Good Thing" (Oliver Sain) – 5:06
2. "Queen of Hearts" (Gregg Allman) – 7:43
3. "I Feel So Bad" (Chuck Willis) – 4:47

=== Side 2 ===
1. "Stand Back" (Gregg Allman, Berry Oakley) – 3:32
2. "Time Will Take Us" - Cowboy (Frank Thomas Talton) – 5:51
3. "Where Can You Go?" - Cowboy (Frank Thomas Talton) – 8:10

=== Side 3 ===
1. "Double Cross" (Gregg Allman, Chuck Leavell) – 4:41
2. "Dreams" (Gregg Allman) – 7:29
3. "Are You Lonely for Me Baby" (Andy Cousin, Warne Livesey, Mark Price, Julianne Regan) – 4:27

=== Side 4 ===
1. "Turn On Your Love Light" (Deadric Malone, Joseph Wade Scott) – 10:45
2. "Oncoming Traffic" (Gregg Allman, Janice B. Allman) – 5:56
3. "Will The Circle Be Unbroken" (Traditional) – 7:21

== Personnel ==
- Gregg Allman - lead vocals, Hammond B-3 organ
- Tommy Talton - lead & slide guitars
- Scott Boyer - rhythm guitar
- Ken Tibbetts - bass guitar
- Bill Stewart - drums
- Jai Johanny Johanson (credited as “Johnny Lee Johnson”) - conga drums & percussion
- Chuck Leavell - acoustic & electric pianos
- Randall Bramblett - soprano, alto & C-melody saxophones (all sax solos)
- David Brown - tenor saxophone
- Harold "Bullets" Williams - baritone saxophone
- Todd Logan, Peter Eklund - trumpets
- Annie Sutton, Erin Dickins, Lynn Rubin - backing vocals
- Willie Perkins - Road Manager Extraordinaire

== Live Concert Artistic Staff ==
- Lenny Cowles - Lighting Designer / Board Opp

== Cowboy (tracks 2 & 3, Side 2) ==
- Tommy Talton - lead vocals, lead & slide guitars
- Scott Boyer - harmony vocals, rhythm guitar
- David Brown - bass guitar
- Chuck Leavell - acoustic & electric pianos
- Randall Bramblett - Hammond B-3 organ, soprano saxophone
- Bill Stewart - drums
- ”Johnny Lee Johnson” - conga drums
- Todd Logan, Peter Eklund - trumpets
- "Bullet" Williams - baritone saxophone
- Gregg Allman - Hammond B-3 organ ("Where Can You Go")

== Production notes ==
- Gregg Allman - Producer
- Johnny Sandlin – Producer, Remixing
- Sam Whiteside - Remixing
- Randall Bramblett - Horn Arranger
- Ed Freeman - Horn & Strings Arranger
- Strings under the direction of Max Cahn
- Edd Kolakowski - piano technician
- George Marino - Mastering
- Dennis M. Drake - Mastering on Compact Disc
- Tom Flye & Tom Scott - Engineers
- Al Clayton - Photographer
