= Paragon Booking Agency =

American talent management company

- Company type: Privately held company
- Industry: Talent management
- Headquarters: Macon, Georgia, United States

Paragon Booking Agency was a musical talent management company based in Macon, Georgia, United States. It was one of the largest booking agencies in the Southeast. In the late 1970s, Ian Copeland, a music promoter, and Bill Berry, future member of R.E.M., worked for the company.

== History ==
Paragon took advantage of the success of Capricorn Records, which was founded in Macon, Georgia, in 1969 by Phil Walden and Frank Fenter. Alex Hodges, who founded Paragon, met Walden at Mercer University. Hodges saw new wave music arriving and said, according to Mike Mills, future bassist with R.E.M., 'We don't have anybody here who understands that. Find my somebody that knows this stuff.'" It is believed that Buck Williams found Ian Copeland, who was managing bands in the United Kingdom at the time. After joining Paragon in 1977, Copeland arranged to have Squeeze tour the U.S. by booking them into small venues, with the hope of word-of-mouth doing the leg work for their popularity. He did the same for the B-52s and the Police, for which his brother Stewart was the drummer.

Artists represented by Paragon included the Allman Brothers Band, Lynyrd Skynyrd and the Charlie Daniels Band. They also booked shows for the Climax Blues Band, who were managed by his other brother, Miles.

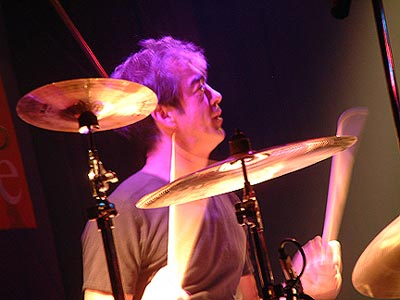
R.E.M. drummer Bill Berry, who worked for Paragon in the late 1970s

In the late 1970s, Bill Berry, later the drummer with R.E.M., became employed by Paragon as a gopher.

Copeland and Berry left Paragon in 1979 — Copeland to form Frontier Booking International (F.B.I.) with Buck Williams and Berry to move to Athens, Georgia, to begin at the University of Georgia.

The company's office was at 560 Arlington Place in Macon. A plaque on the building denotes it as the "booking agency for R.E.M., the Police, the B-52s and other New Wave bands. The former home of Bill Berry and Mike Mills, next door at 572 Arlington Place, also has a plaque.

=== Personnel ===
Rodgers Redding, brother of Otis, ran the company's rhythm and blues department, while John Huie, a Davidson College alumni, ran the college-music division of Paragon.
