= Honest to Goodness =

Studio album by Grinderswitch
- Released: 1974
- Studio: Capricorn Sound Studios
- Genre: Southern rock; blues rock
- Length: 37:43
- Label: Capricorn Records
- Producer: Paul Hornsby

Grinderswitch chronology
Honest to Goodness (1974)	Macon Tracks (1975)

Professional ratings
Review scores
Source	Rating
AllMusic	2.5/5 stars
The New Rolling Stone Record Guide	2/5 stars

Honest to Goodness is the debut album by Southern rock band Grinderswitch, released in 1974. The album contains contributions from Dickey Betts and Jaimoe of The Allman Brothers Band.

== Critical reception ==
Billboard wrote that the band "sound like a less virtuoso Marshall Tucker Band."

== Track listing ==
All songs written by Dru Lombar except where noted:

1. "Kiss the Blues Goodbye" - 4:55
2. "Can't Keep a Good Man Down" (D. Lombar, J.D. Petty, L. Howard, R. Burnett) - 3:54
3. "How the West Was Won" (L. Howard) - 5:22
4. "Eighty Miles to Memphis" (J.D. Petty) - 3:00
5. "Catch a Train" - 4:44
6. "Roll On Gambler" - 5:15
7. "Homebound" - 6:45
8. "Peach County Jamboree" - 3:48
9. "You're So Fine" (Live Version) - 3:29 (1994 CD Reissue)

== Personnel ==
Band members

- Dru Lombar - lead and slide guitars, lead vocals
- Larry Howard - electric and acoustic guitars
- Joe Dan Petty - bass, backing vocals
- Rick Burnett - drums, congas, percussion

Additional musicians

- Paul Hornsby - piano and organ
- Richard Betts - Guitar on "Kiss the Blues Goodbye"
- Jaimoe - Congas on "Can't Keep a Good Man Down" and "How the West Was Won"

Production

- Design, Art Direction - Richard Mantel
- Engineer - O.V. Sparks
- Asst. Engineer - Tony Humphreys
- Mastered by Bob Ludwig
- Photography by Al Clayton
- Producer - Paul Hornsby
- Tape Asst. - Carolyn Harriss, Richard Schoff
