= Scott Boyer =

American singer-songwriter

- Born: Charles Scott Boyer II; October 17, 1947; Chenango, New York, U.S.
- Died: February 13, 2018 (aged 70); Muscle Shoals, Alabama, U.S.
- Occupation: Singer-songwriter
- Musical career
- Genres: Rock; country rock; folk; Southern rock
- Instruments: Guitar; vocals; violin
- Years active: 1965–2018
- Labels: Capricorn; BVK Music

Charles Scott Boyer II (October 17, 1947 – February 13, 2018) was an American singer-songwriter and guitarist. Boyer was best known for co-founding the band Cowboy. Boyer was born in Chenango, New York, and moved to Jacksonville, Florida in his youth.

After high school, he played in the band the 31st of February. He co-founded Cowboy with songwriter Tommy Talton in 1969, which released four albums and supported the Allman Brothers Band on tour. Boyer's song "Please Be with Me" was later covered by Eric Clapton. After Cowboy's breakup, Boyer continued playing music. He moved to Muscle Shoals, Alabama in 1988 and continued playing in a band called the Decoys until his death in 2018.

== Life and career ==
Boyer was born in Chenango, New York. He first began receiving music lessons at age four, and he became interested in folk music through groups like Peter, Paul and Mary. He and his family later relocated to Louisville, Kentucky, and then Jacksonville, Florida. He graduated from Englewood High School, where he was a part of the school's orchestra. He then attended Florida State University studying viola, but dropped out.

He later became a part of the group The Bitter Ind., which later changed their name to the 31st of February. In 1969, he and songwriter Tommy Talton formed the southern rock/country rock outfit Cowboy, which signed to Macon, Georgia-based Capricorn Records at guitarist Duane Allman's suggestion. The band relocated to Macon and subsequently released four albums—Reach for the Sky (1970), 5'll Getcha Ten (1971), Boyer & Talton (1974), and Cowboy (1977). Though they remained largely obscure, Cowboy supported the Allman Brothers Band on its tours and later served as the backing band for Gregg Allman's 1974 solo tour. "Please Be with Me", written by Boyer, later went on to be covered by Eric Clapton for his 1974 album 461 Ocean Boulevard.

After Cowboy's dissolution in the late 1970s, Boyer continued to play music. He briefly moved to Los Angeles, where he wrote songs with Ricky Hirsch from Wet Willie, and produced an album for a band called the Sky Boys. He later joined a band called Locust Fork, and then another band called the Convertibles which briefly reunited him with Talton. He moved to Muscle Shoals, Alabama in 1988 and began performing with the Decoys, a band founded by Johnny Sandlin, who produced Cowboy's albums as well as albums by the Allman Brothers and Widespread Panic.

He released a solo album called All My Friends in 1991, and released a collaboration album with N.C. Thurman in 2012 titled Ok, How About This. He and Talton reformed Cowboy in 2007 and recorded an album's worth of material with Sandlin, but this material has never been released. They staged one more live performance as Cowboy in 2010, which was issued the following year as a live album, titled Boyer & Talton: Cowboy Reunion 2010.

In 2007, Boyer was diagnosed with peripheral artery disease. The Birmingham, Alabama-based Garage Café—where the Decoys would often perform—hosted a benefit concert to help with his medical bills in 2013. Boyer died in Muscle Shoals on February 13, 2018. Talton said, "No one could write a more beautiful ballad than Scott Boyer. I love him and I miss him more than anything that can be said." Singer-songwriter and Drive-By Truckers guitarist Jason Isbell, tweeted that "Scott Boyer was the first real songwriter that ever took me seriously. I was living on his couch when I met [Drive-By Truckers co-founder] Patterson Hood. Scott wrote beautiful songs, and he was a damn good singer. We'll all miss him a lot."

== Discography ==
Solo

- All My Friends (1991)
- Ok, How About This (2012) (with N.C. Thurman)

With Cowboy

- Reach for the Sky (1970)
- 5'll Getcha Ten (1971)
- Boyer & Talton (1974)
- Cowboy (1977)
- 10'll Getcha Twenty (2018)

With Tommy Talton

- Live At The NuttHouse (2016)

With The Decoys

- Live At Union Station (1992)
- Shot from the Saddle (2001)
- Live At The NuttHouse (2017)
