= Southern Ashe =

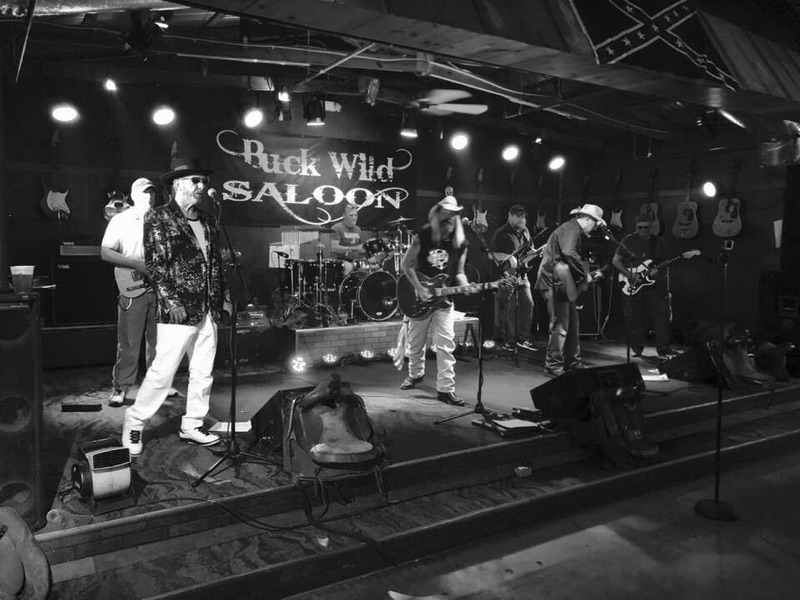

Background information
- Origin: Georgia/Alabama
- Genres: Southern Rock
- Years active: 1978–present
- Members: Jeff Frederick; Steve Westmoreland; Keith Stewart; Robert Earl Lowery; Alan Hussey; Jeff Greer

Southern Ashe is an American Southern Rock/Country Rock Band from Columbus, Georgia. They have toured with Wet Willie, Stillwater and Wild Cherry, and performed as a supporting act to artists such as Rush, The J. Geils Band, Joe Cocker, Alabama, Ronnie Milsap, Merle Haggard, Jerry Reed, Hank Williams Jr., Vince Gill, John Anderson and others. They are best known for their song "Paradise", which was co-produced by Leon Everette and reached #80 on the Billboard Country chart in August 1981.

== Band members ==
=== Current ===
- Jeff Fredrick - guitar, keyboard, vocals
- Steve Westmoreland - guitar
- Keith Stewart - guitar, vocals
- Robert Earl Lowery - bass
- Alan Hussey - drums
- Jeff Greer - drums, vocals

=== Former ===
- Terry Young
- Rud King
- Tony Stephens
- Jimmy Pope
- Robert Earl Lowery
- Mike McLain
- Duke Vaughn
- Gil Milligan
- Mike Funk
- Ben Cross

== Discography ==
=== Studio albums ===
- Highway Cowboy (1979)
1. "Highway Cowboy" (Fredrick, McLain) 3:14
2. "Love Stumblin' Blues" (Stephens) 3:04
3. "Pizza, Beer, and Rock 'n Roll" (Welch, Fredrick ) 3:22
4. "Tell Me" (Stephens) 4:20
5. "Love Games" (Pope) 3:17
6. "Apple Cider Sally" (Welch, Stephens)
7. "Rockin' the South" (Fredrick, Pope)
8. "Sweet Anne" (Fredrick)
9. "Last Train" (Fredrick, McLain)
10. "Rock 'n Roll Lovers" (Stephens, McLain)

=== Singles ===
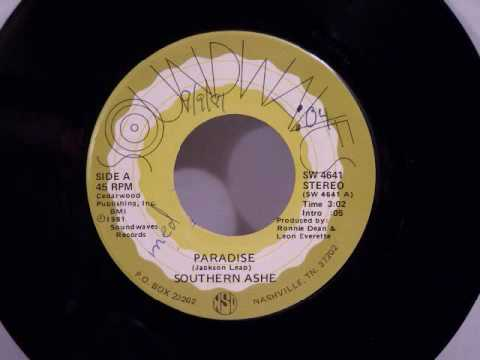
"Paradise"

- "Paradise" (1981) (B-side: Loving On A Three-Way Street)
- "Showdown" (1981)
- "Real Woman" (1982)
