= Cowboy (band) =

US musical group

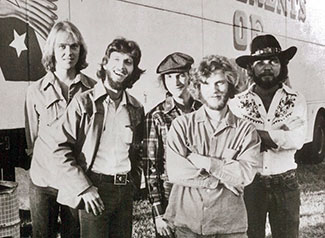
- The band's lineup of (left-to-right) David Brown, Scott Boyer, Bill Stewart, Randall Bramblett, and Tommy Talton

Background information
- Origin: Jacksonville, Florida, U.S.
- Genres: Country rock; Southern rock
- Years active: 1969–1977; 2007–2011
- Label: Capricorn Records
- Past members: Scott Boyer; Tommy Talton; Chuck Leavell; Bill Pillmore; George Clark; Peter Kowalke; Randall Bramblett; Tomm Wynn; Bill Stewart; David Brown; Arch Pearson

Cowboy was an American country rock and southern rock band formed in Jacksonville, Florida, in 1969. The group's main members consisted of songwriters Tommy Talton and Scott Boyer, alongside a rotating group of musicians. They released four albums on the Capricorn Records label in the 1970s: Reach for the Sky (1970), 5'll Getcha Ten (1971), Boyer and Talton (1974), and Cowboy (1977). The song "Please Be with Me"–perhaps their best-known song–featured a performance from Duane Allman. It was also later covered by Eric Clapton on his album 461 Ocean Boulevard (1974).

The group's sound has been compared to Hearts & Flowers, the Nitty Gritty Dirt Band, and Pure Prairie League. Steve Leggett of Allmusic considered Cowboy "one of Capricorn Records' and Southern rock's best-kept secrets during the genre's golden age in the 1970s." The group reformed in 2007 and recorded an album, released a decade later as 10'll Getcha Twenty. In addition, this iteration also issued a live album, Boyer & Talton: Cowboy Reunion 2010.

== Biography ==
Cowboy was formed in 1969 in Jacksonville, Florida by singer-songwriters Scott Boyer and Tommy Talton, with pianist/guitarist Bill Pillmore, bassist George Clark, guitarist Pete Kowalke, and drummer Tom Wynn rounding out the original lineup. The six musicians, all from around the Orlando/Jacksonville area, rented a home in Jacksonville where they lived and rehearsed together. Previously, Boyer had played with Duane Allman and his brother, Gregg, in the folk-rock group the 31st of February. Duane, at that point of the Allman Brothers Band, suggested them to Phil Walden, owner of Capricorn Records. Leggett writes that the band's lineup was ever-changing during this time, besides "Talton and Boyer, both of whom became de facto members of the Capricorn house band, playing with the Allman Brothers, Gregg Allman, Alex Taylor, and Bonnie Bramlett." Their debut album, Reach for the Sky, was released in 1971, and their second, 5'll Getcha Ten, followed later that year. The latter album featured "Please Be with Me", which featured Allman on dobro. Eric Clapton later covered the song for his album 461 Ocean Boulevard (1974).

By 1972, much of the original Cowboy lineup departed. "People just started moving in different directions. I don't remember there being any animosity about it," Talton recalled in 2014. He and Boyer continued on as Cowboy, supporting Gregg Allman on his first solo effort Laid Back in 1973, and accompanying him as his backing band on its ensuing tour, which was captured on the 1974 live album The Gregg Allman Tour. The band's third album, Boyer & Talton, saw release the same year. Their final, self-titled record was released in 1977. Leggett also notes that "the 1976 album Happy to Be Alive, attributed to the trio of Tommy Talton, Bill Stewart, and Johnny Sandlin, might be considered a Cowboy album in all but name."

Boyer and Talton continued to work together sporadically over the years. They reformed Cowboy thirty years after their dissolution in 2007. This iteration recorded at least an album's worth of music with Sandlin at his studio, Duck Tape Studio, in Decatur, Alabama. When asked about the album in an interview some years later, Boyer told AL.com that "the project fell to the wayside. We ran into some technical difficulties." In 2010, they performed their first concert in over thirty years, billed as Cowboy/Boyer & Talton, at the Cox Capital Theatre in Macon. They were joined by Stewart on drums, Stan Robertson on bass, and Randall Bramblett on keyboards, saxophone, and vocals. It was issued the following year as a live album, titled Boyer & Talton: Cowboy Reunion 2010.

Boyer died on February 13, 2018. His musical partner Talton said, "No one could write a more beautiful ballad than Scott Boyer. I love him and I miss him more than anything that can be said." Later that year, the band's final reunion album, titled 10'll Getcha Twenty, was released. It features the recordings made in 2007, and marks not only the original members' final recordings, but producer Sandlin's as well. Tommy Talton died on December 28, 2023, at the age of 74.

== Discography ==
Albums

Studio albums

- Reach for the Sky (1970)
- 5'll Getcha Ten (1971)
- Boyer & Talton (1974)
- Cowboy (1977)
- 10'll Getcha Twenty (2018)

Live albums

- Boyer & Talton: Cowboy Reunion 2010 (2011)

Compilation albums

- Why Quit When You're Losing (1973)
- The Best of Cowboy - A Different Time (1993)

Singles

- "It's Time" (1970)
- "A Patch & A Pain Killer" (1974)
- "I Will Be There (Pat's Song)" (1977)
- "Takin' It All The Way" (1977)
- "10'll Getcha Twenty" (2018)
