= Grinderswitch =

American rock band

- Origin: Macon, Georgia, U.S.
- Genres: Southern rock; country rock; blues rock
- Years active: 1973–1982, 2004–2005
- Labels: Capricorn; Atco; Auric Records; Robox Records; One Way Records; A New South Production; Halycon
- Past members: Dru Lombar; Joe Dan Petty; Larry Howard; Rick Burnett; Stephen Miller; Austin Petit; Chris Anderson; Eddie Stone; Jack Corcaran; Steve Miller; Wally Condon
- Website: grinderswitch.com

Grinderswitch was a southern rock band formed near Macon, Georgia in 1973. Formed from a collaboration of musicians through word of mouth and connections to already established bands and musicians, Grinderswitch became a known act during the peak of the southern rock era. They recorded two albums for Capricorn Records in the mid-1970s, but never achieved the widespread recognition enjoyed by some of the label's other artists, such as The Allman Brothers Band and Marshall Tucker Band. In the UK, they are perhaps best known for their recording "Pickin' the Blues", which was used for many years by the disc jockey John Peel as the theme tune for his BBC radio shows.

== History ==
Grinderswitch’s earliest incarnation began in 1972 when Allman Brothers roadie and guitar tech Joe Dan Petty was looking to put a band together. During this time, Dickey Betts was also attempting to form a band due to the uncertain fate of the Allman Brothers Band after the death of Duane Allman. Les Dudek, a guitar player who got word that Dickey Betts was starting a side band from the Allmans, travelled to Macon, Georgia to audition. Dickey’s band was put on hold due to the possibility of a new Allman Brothers album. Dudek was asked by Petty to join his new band but declined, hoping to take part in the new Allman Brothers album. Dudek suggested past "Blue Truth" bandmates Larry Howard and Rick Burnett to Petty. Les Dudek would go on to contribute to Brothers and Sisters. During this time Dru Lombar had also caught wind of Joe Dan Petty forming a band and travelled to Macon to complete the formation of Grinderswitch. The newly formed band went to stay at a farm near Warner Robins, Georgia to rehearse and eventually gain the interest of Paul Hornsby and Phil Walden of Capricorn Records.

Grinderswitch would go on to tour with The Allman Brothers Band, The Marshall Tucker Band, The Charlie Daniels Band, Wet Willie, Bonnie Bramlett, Lynyrd Skynyrd, and Raspberries (band) as well as involve many guest musicians on some albums. Grinderswitch was also a participant in the Volunteer Jam. They recorded three albums for Capricorn Records before signing to Rabbitt Records to release what many call their biggest album, Redwing.

== Discography ==
=== Studio albums ===
- Honest to Goodness (1974)
- Macon Tracks (1975)
- Pullin' Together (1976)
- Redwing (1977) US 144
- Right On Time (1980)
- Have Band Will Travel (1981)
- Unfinished Business (1982)
- Ghost Train From Georgia (2004)

=== Live albums ===
- Live Tracks (1994)
- Live At My Father's Place (2002)
