= Thomas Wynn and The Believers =

American rock band

- Origin: Orlando, Florida, United States
- Genres: Folk; Country; Southern Rock
- Years active: 2009–Present
- Labels: Provogue Records; Mascot Label Group
- Members: Thomas Wynn; Olivia Wynn; Chris Antemesaris; Dave Wagner; Ryan Miranda; Colin Fei

Thomas Wynn and the Believers is an American rock band from Orlando, Florida, formed in 2009. They gained a reputation in the Orlando area after being named the #1 Rock and #1 Country/Folk band for seven consecutive years by Orlando Weekly. They signed to Mascot Label Group and released their debut album, Wade Waist Deep, in 2017.

== History ==
The band was formed by Thomas Wynn and his sister, Olivia, after the dissolution of his previous band. The two both grew up playing music together in church, where Thomas played guitar and drums while his sister was a member of the choir. Their father is Tomm Wynn, drummer of the band Cowboy.

Prior to signing with Mascot Label Group, the band had released two albums: The Reason in 2009 and Brothers & Sisters in 2012. The band began work on their label debut in Nashville in the late summer of 2016, with producer Vance Powell. The album, titled Wade Waist Deep, was released on May 19, 2017. The video for the title track was produced by filmmaker Blake Judd.

The band toured throughout 2017 and 2018 in support of the record, including supporting The Temperance Movement on their UK tour, as well as performing at Firefly Festival and SunFest. The band was recognized by Billboard as a band "to know" for festival goers in 2018.
