= Brothers and Sisters (album) =

Studio album by the Allman Brothers Band
- Released: August 6, 1973
- Recorded: October–December 1972
- Studio: Capricorn Sound (Macon)
- Genre: Southern rock
- Length: 38:21
- Label: Capricorn
- Producers: Johnny Sandlin; The Allman Brothers Band

The Allman Brothers Band chronology
Beginnings (1973)	Brothers and Sisters (1973)	Win, Lose or Draw (1975)

Singles from Brothers and Sisters
- 1. "Ramblin' Man" / "Pony Boy" Released: August 6, 1973; 2. "Jessica" / "Come and Go Blues" Released: December 1973

Brothers and Sisters is the fourth studio album by American rock band the Allman Brothers Band. Co-produced by Johnny Sandlin and the band, the album was released on August 6, 1973, in the United States, by Capricorn Records. Following the death of group leader Duane Allman in 1971, the Allman Brothers Band released Eat a Peach (1972), a hybrid studio/live album that became their biggest-selling album to date. Afterwards, the group purchased a farm in Juliette, Georgia, to become a "group hangout". However, bassist Berry Oakley was visibly suffering from the death of Duane, excessively drinking and consuming drugs. In November 1972, after nearly a year of severe depression, Oakley was killed in a motorcycle accident (not dissimilar from Duane's), making it the last album on which he played.

The band carried on, adding new members Chuck Leavell on piano and Lamar Williams on bass. Brothers and Sisters was largely recorded over a period of three months at Capricorn Sound Studios in Macon, Georgia. Lead guitarist Dickey Betts assumed the role of band leader, and many of his compositions reflected a more country-inspired sound. Session guitarists Les Dudek and Tommy Talton sat in on several songs. The album was being produced at the same time as vocalist/organist Gregg Allman's solo debut, Laid Back, and features many of the same musicians and engineers.

The album represented the Allmans' commercial peak: it has sold over seven million copies worldwide, landing it at the time atop of the Top 200 Pop Albums for five weeks. "Ramblin' Man" became the band's first and only Top-10 hit single, peaking at number two on the Billboard Hot 100 in 1973. The album was followed by a tour of arenas and stadiums, but drug problems, strained friendships, and miscommunications marred relationships between group members during this time.

== Background ==
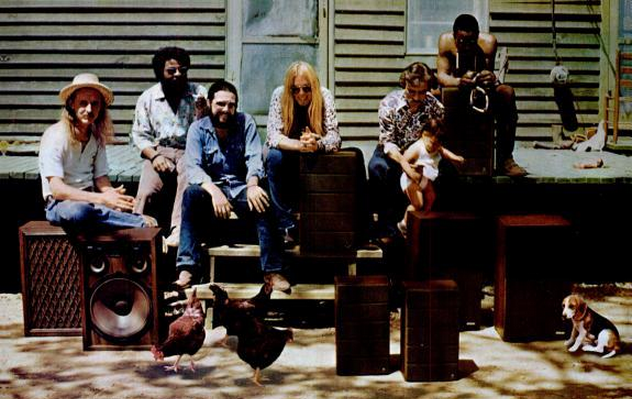
The Allman Brothers Band at "the Farm" in Juliette, Georgia, 1973.

Shortly following band leader Duane Allman's death in late October 1971, the Allman Brothers Band released Eat a Peach, a hybrid studio/live album that became their biggest release yet; it peaked at number four on the Billboard charts. The band performed nearly 90 shows in the following year, touring as a five-piece. The band also purchased 432 acres of land in Juliette, Georgia, for $160,000 and nicknamed it "the Farm"; it soon became a "group hangout" and fulfilled bassist Berry Oakley's communal dreams. Oakley, however, was visibly suffering from the death of Duane: he excessively drank and consumed drugs, and was losing weight quickly. According to friends and family, he appeared to have lost "all hope, his heart, his drive, his ambition, [and] his direction" following Duane's death. "Everything Berry had envisioned for everybody—including the crew, the women and children—was shattered on the day Duane died, and he didn't care after that," said roadie Kim Payne.

During recording sessions for their upcoming album, vocalist Gregg Allman was also working on his solo album, Laid Back, and the sessions occasionally overlapped. Chuck Leavell was asked to play piano for Allman's solo album, and gradually found himself contributing to the Allman Brothers as well. Allman and Betts took turns caring for Oakley, taking him outdoors to places like the zoo to keep him from drinking as much. "Time and time again, I have sat and wondered, 'God, what in the hell could I have done, what could have anybody have done, to help him?'" said Allman. Upon Leavell's entry into the group, Oakley went out of his way to make the new member comfortable. On November 11, 1972, overjoyed at the prospect of leading a jam session later that night, Oakley crashed his motorcycle into the side of a bus, just three blocks from where Duane had been killed in a bike accident. He declined hospital treatment and went home, but gradually grew delirious. He was taken to the hospital shortly thereafter and died of cerebral swelling caused by a fractured skull. Oakley was buried directly beside Duane at Rose Hill Cemetery in Macon, Georgia.

The band unanimously decided to carry on and arrange auditions for new bassists, with a renewed fervor and determination. Several bassists auditioned, but the band picked Lamar Williams, an old friend of drummer Jai Johanny Johanson's from Gulfport, Mississippi. The band immediately recognized that Williams represented the best of both Oakley's style and his own style, and they were pleased with his easygoing demeanor. The addition of Leavell and Williams to the band brought about renewed passion and uplifted spirits within the group.

== Recording and production ==
The band began recording Brothers and Sisters in the autumn of 1972 at Capricorn Studios in Macon, Georgia, prior to Oakley's death. The band had previously started rehearsals for the album in the summer. Allman brought a song he had worked on for a year, titled "Queen of Hearts", but he was drunk and none of the members of the band would listen to him. This was the catalyst that led to Allman beginning work on Laid Back, his debut solo album. After Williams helped record the album's third track, "Come and Go Blues", the rest of the recording process was smooth.

Betts became the group's de facto leader during the recording process. "It's not like Dickey came in and said, 'I'm taking over. I'm the boss. Do this and that.' It wasn't overt; it was still supposedly a democracy but Dickey started doing more and more of the songwriting," said road manager Willie Perkins. The band first recorded "Wasted Words" and "Ramblin' Man," the latter showcasing a more country-infused sound. The entire group was initially reluctant to record "Ramblin' Man" — "We knew it was a good song but it didn't sound like us," said drummer Butch Trucks — but the band gradually headed in a more country direction, as that was Betts' background. Betts was very serious about his songwriting, sitting down each afternoon to write.

The band was adamant about not replacing Duane's lead guitar role. Les Dudek, the guitarist who would eventually play on "Jessica" and "Ramblin' Man," had entered the sessions when he was asked to jam with Betts through mutual friends. The band enjoyed how Dudek played and Phil Walden, the band's manager, seemed set on Dudek being in the band. Word of mouth, propagated by Dudek himself, was that he "got the gig" and had become the Allman Brothers' new co-lead guitarist. "We went looking for this dude to kick his ass. Nobody was going to replace Duane and the very thought of it was infuriating to us," said Trucks. After recording completed, Dudek went on the road with Boz Scaggs and the Steve Miller Band. He wanted to end his contract with Phil Walden at Capricorn, and part of his release granted him no part of the publishing deal for Brothers and Sisters, including a songwriting credit for "Jessica", as he had no written contract.

== Writing ==
"Jessica"
"Jessica" is an instrumental with an upbeat opening inspired by Betts's daughter, Jessica. It was later used as the theme for Top Gear in the UK.

"Ramblin' Man" pre-dates the album, and was first created during songwriting sessions for Eat a Peach. An embryonic version, referring to a "ramblin' country man," can be heard on the bootleg The Gatlinburg Tapes, featuring the band jamming on an off-day in April 1971 in Gatlinburg, Tennessee. A version more similar to the finished recording was broadcast on ABC's In Concert TV program in December 1972, several months in advance of Brothers and Sisters's release.

"Jessica" was co-written by Betts and Dudek, although only Betts received credit. Betts first created the song as an experiment, to test whether or not he could write a song that could be played with just two fingers, in honor of Gypsy jazz guitar virtuoso Django Reinhardt, who played with two left fingers due to severe burns. When his baby daughter Jessica entered the room and began bouncing around to the melody, Betts attempted to capture her mood with the song. Dudek created the song's bridge when Betts became frustrated with the piece. Dudek was disappointed when he was told he would only be recording the acoustic guitar opening, as Betts felt Dudek performing the harmonies to both "Ramblin' Man" and "Jessica" would lead critics to assume he was a member of the band. Leavell also contributed heavily to "Jessica", mostly on the arrangement.

"Jelly Jelly" was the final song recorded for Brothers and Sisters, credited to Gregg Allman. The song actually contained lyrics from Bobby Bland's song of the same name, albeit with a very different melody and arrangement. Brothers and Sisters concludes with another country-inspired track, "Pony Boy," which showcases Betts' Dobro playing. The song was heavily inspired by Robert Johnson in its building rhythm, and Blind Willie McTell influenced its humor. The song was based on a true story involving his uncle, who would take his horse out to avoid driving under the influence (DUI) charges, as the horse knew the direction home. Williams played upright bass on the track to keep it an all-acoustic affair, and Trucks played percussion by banging a piece of plywood on the floor.

== Artwork ==
The photographs used for the album's artwork were taken at "the Farm" in Juliette, Georgia. The front album cover features a photograph of Vaylor Trucks, the son of drummer Butch Trucks and his wife Linda. The back cover features a photograph of Brittany Oakley, the daughter of Berry Oakley and his wife Linda. The gatefold spread reveals a photo of the band and their extended families. "I have an almost dreamlike memory of the way things were—parties, people giving the horses beer, various people in and out," said Brittany Oakley in 1996. She noted that despite the good memories, "it was painful" following her father's death, which is when the photo was taken. Vaylor Trucks later went on to study at Florida State University, where he formed a band. To promote a concert, they printed covers of the Brothers and Sisters album cover with the caption "Have you seen me lately?", which led to a sold-out crowd.

== Release ==
=== Commercial performance ===
Brothers and Sisters was immediately successful. The record went gold in retail sales within 48 hours after shipping began. Capricorn estimated that these early sales were due to hardcore fans of the group. The album sold 760,000 copies in its first three weeks, making it one of the fastest-starting albums in Warner/Elektra/Atlantic Records' history. Billboard called it the "success story of the summer," noting that there was no "sustained merchandising promotion effort needed" on the LP. Record stores credited the album with bringing business back to their stores in a lagging season. Brothers and Sisters was the band's best-performing album on the charts: it logged five weeks as the number one album in the country on the Billboard Top LP's & Tape chart.

Capricorn executives were split between issuing "Wasted Words" or "Ramblin' Man" as the lead single. National promotion director Dick Wooley sent advance tapes of "Ramblin' Man" to Atlanta and Boston radio stations and "listener phone-in reaction was near-phenomenal." "Ramblin' Man" became a rare rock hit on AM stations nationwide, and it rose to number two on the Billboard Hot 100. Although "Jessica" rose no higher than number 65 on the Hot 100, it later became a staple of classic rock radio. It was later employed as the theme song to the television program Top Gear in the United Kingdom.

Brothers and Sisters has since sold over seven million copies worldwide.

=== Critical reception ===
Professional ratings
Review scores
Source	Rating
AllMusic	4/5 stars
Creem	A−
Encyclopedia of Popular Music	3/5 stars
Rolling Stone Album Guide	4/5 stars

Reviews of Brothers and Sisters in 1973 were mostly positive. Bud Scoppa of Rolling Stone deemed the album "no masterpiece, but the new band has shown that it can carry on the work of the old, and add the appropriate new twists when necessary. They've finally discovered a form that feels as natural in the studio as it does in front of their people. It's heartening to see a group of this commercial and critical stature still working so hard at getting even better." Janis Schacht of Circus was very positive, writing, "Never, even in the face of adversity, do the Allman Brothers quit making strong, hard-driving rock/blues albums. ... This is another in the continuing line of quality products from The Allman Brothers Band." Billboard called it "A fine blues/rock set from this fine band, featuring top lead vocals from Gregg Allman and Dickey Betts, and the excellent instrumental fusion for which they are particularly well known." In Creem, Robert Christgau said "Gregg Allman is a predictable singer who never has an unpredictable lyric to work with anyway, and the jams do roll on, but at their best—"Ramblin' Man," a miraculous revitalization of rock's weariest conceit—they just may be the best."

Subsequent reviews have remained positive. Bruce Eder of Allmusic called Brothers and Sisters "not quite a classic album, especially in the wake of the four that had appeared previously, but it served as a template for some killer stage performances, and it proved that the band could survive the deaths of two key members." Andrew Mueller of Uncut deemed it their "indisputable commercial peak and arguable creative apogee."

A 2013 four-disc reissue of the album received very positive reviews as well. David Fricke of Rolling Stone gave it four stars, writing, "The road to that symmetry is caught in this four-CD set by a disc of rehearsals and outtakes that sounds like the work of a more brawny, Southern Grateful Dead." Walter Tunis of the Lexington Herald-Leader wrote that "The larger set is costlier, about $65, but the edition's two live discs chronicle the Chuck Leavell/Lamar Williams-era Allmans as exquisitely as Fillmore East did the groundbreaking Duane Allman/Berry Oakley lineup."

== Touring ==
Now leaderless and demoralized, the band was influenced mostly by the road crew that surrounded them. By industry standards the road crew was a cluster-fuck of drugged-out hangers-on that seemingly kept their job by keeping the ABB supplied with drugs and high most of the time. It was crazy and out of control.

— Dick Wooley, Capricorn Records

After completing Brothers and Sisters, the Allman Brothers Band returned to touring, playing larger venues, receiving more profit and dealing with less friendship, miscommunication and spiraling drug problems. This culminated in a backstage brawl when the band played with the Grateful Dead at Washington's RFK Stadium in June 1973. The roadies of the Dead dosed the food and drinks of as many people as possible with LSD, holding no compunction about the practice as they felt "evangelical" about the substance. The stage was very crowded with the Dead's entourage, and roadie Kim Payne instructed driver Tuffy Phillips to let no one onstage. When Capricorn promotional chief Dick Wooley attempted to get onstage, Phillips punched Wooley in the nose. Wooley competed in martial arts and began punching back. When all three roadies engaged in the fight, the Dead's security (the Hells Angels) assumed Wooley a "bad guy" and they joined. Soon, the Grateful Dead's roadies realized the situation at hand and they pulled Wooley from the pile.

Walden demanded that whoever was responsible be terminated; as a result, Kim Payne, Mike Callahan, and Tuffy Phillips all were fired. "That was a culmination of everything falling apart. ... They were a symptom of the problem—not the problem itself," said Perkins. The band again joined the Grateful Dead and the Band in July at Watkins Glen Speedway in New York's Finger Lakes region, for what was then deemed the largest rock concert ever. 150,000 tickets were sold, but the crowd expanded to nearly 600,000, causing it to be declared a disaster area. People abandoned their cars and walked up to ten miles to attend the concert. The jam between the three bands was later called "garbage" by Trucks, as all involved were under the influence of various substances, including alcohol, cocaine, and LSD. To promote the release of the album, Don Kirshner's Rock Concert program staged an episode set in Macon, taping performances from the Allman Brothers Band and the Marshall Tucker Band. Betts walked offstage midway through the performance, with Walden chasing him down the street and urging him to return. "Walking off the stage was a first for me. It was like, 'Dude, what are you doing? We're all brothers here. If there's a problem, let's talk about it,'" said Leavell.

Riding its soaring popularity, the band concentrated on playing arenas and stadiums. In 1974, it was regularly making $100,000 per show, and renting the Starship, a customized Boeing 720B used by Led Zeppelin and later the Rolling Stones.

== Track listing ==
Side one
No.	Title	Writer(s)	Personnel	Length
1.	"Wasted Words"	Gregg Allman	Personnel: Gregg Allman – lead vocals, rhythm guitar; Dickey Betts – slide guitar; Chuck Leavell – piano; Berry Oakley – bass; Butch Trucks – drums; Jaimoe – drums	4:20
2.	"Ramblin' Man"	Dickey Betts	Personnel: Dickey Betts – lead guitar, lead vocals; Les Dudek – lead guitar; Gregg Allman – organ, backing vocals; Chuck Leavell – piano, backing vocals; Berry Oakley – bass; Butch Trucks – drums, percussion; Jaimoe – drums, congas	4:48
3.	"Come and Go Blues"	Gregg Allman	Personnel: Dickey Betts – lead guitar; Gregg Allman – organ, lead vocals; Chuck Leavell – electric and acoustic pianos; Lamar Williams – bass; Butch Trucks – drums, congas, percussion; Jaimoe – drums	4:54
4.	"Jelly Jelly"	Billy Eckstine; Earl Hines	Personnel: Dickey Betts – lead guitar; Gregg Allman – organ, lead vocals; Chuck Leavell – piano; Lamar Williams – bass; Butch Trucks – drums, congas, percussion; Jaimoe – drums	5:46

Side two
No.	Title	Writer(s)	Personnel	Length
1.	"Southbound"	Dickey Betts	Personnel: Dickey Betts – lead guitar; Gregg Allman – organ, lead vocals; Chuck Leavell – piano; Lamar Williams – bass; Butch Trucks – drums, percussion; Jaimoe – drums	5:11
2.	"Jessica"	Dickey Betts	Personnel: Dickey Betts – lead guitar; Les Dudek – acoustic guitar; Gregg Allman – organ; Chuck Leavell – electric and acoustic pianos; Lamar Williams – bass; Butch Trucks – drums, timpani, percussion; Jaimoe – drums, congas	7:31
3.	"Pony Boy"	Dickey Betts	Personnel: Dickey Betts – Dobro, lead vocals; Tommy Talton – acoustic guitar; Chuck Leavell – piano; Lamar Williams – acoustic bass; Butch Trucks – drums	5:51

- The credits for the song "Jelly Jelly" are not included in the liner notes for the original 1973 LP release. Instead, there are credits for the song "Early Morning Blues," a Gregg Allman-penned outtake that would be featured on the deluxe 2013 rerelease.

== Personnel ==
All credits adapted from liner notes.

=== The Allman Brothers Band ===
- Gregg Allman – vocals, Hammond organ, rhythm guitar on "Wasted Words", backing vocals on "Ramblin' Man"
- Dickey Betts – lead guitar, vocals on "Ramblin' Man" and "Pony Boy", slide guitar on "Wasted Words", dobro on "Pony Boy"
- Berry Oakley – bass guitar on "Wasted Words" and "Ramblin' Man"
- Jai Johanny Johanson – drums, congas on "Ramblin' Man" and "Jessica"
- Butch Trucks – drums, percussion, timpani on "Jessica", congas on "Come and Go Blues" and "Jelly Jelly"
- Chuck Leavell – piano, electric piano on "Jessica" and "Come and Go Blues", backing vocals on "Ramblin' Man".
- Lamar Williams – bass guitar

=== Additional musicians ===
- Les Dudek – co-lead guitar on "Ramblin' Man", acoustic guitar on "Jessica"
- Tommy Talton – acoustic guitar on "Pony Boy"

=== Production ===
- Johnny Sandlin – production, engineer, remix
- Ovie Sparks – engineer, remix
- Buddy Thornton – engineer
- George Marino – mastering engineer
- Judi Reeve – graphic content
- Dan Hudson Jr. – photography
- Bo Meriwether – photography
- Barry Feinstein – layout, design
- Vicki Hodgett – layout, design

== Charts ==
Chart (1973)	Peak position
Australian Albums (Kent Music Report)	5
Canada Top Albums/CDs (RPM)	1
Dutch Albums (Album Top 100)	10
UK Albums (Official Charts)	42
US Billboard 200	1

Chart (2013)	Peak position
German Albums (Offizielle Top 100)	52

Chart (2015)	Peak position
Spanish Albums (Promusicae)	97

== Certifications ==
Region	Certification	Certified units/sales
United States (RIAA)	Platinum	1,000,000^{^}
^{^} Shipments figures based on certification alone.
