= Ian Copeland =

British-American music promoter

- Born: Ian Adie Copeland; April 25, 1949; Rif Dimashq Governorate, Syria
- Died: May 23, 2006 (aged 57)
- Other name: Leroy Coolbreeze
- Occupations: Music promoter; booking agent
- Spouse: Constance Walden
- Children: 2
- Parents: Miles Copeland Jr. (father); Lorraine Copeland (mother)
- Family: Miles Copeland III (brother); Stewart Copeland (brother); William John Adie (grandfather)

Ian Adie Copeland (April 25, 1949 – May 23, 2006) was a British-American music promoter and booking agent who helped launch the new wave movement in the United States.

== Early life ==
Copeland was born in Rif Dimashq near Damascus, Syria, the second of four children born to American CIA officer Miles Copeland Jr. and his British wife Lorraine Copeland (née Adie), an archaeologist. His older brother Miles Copeland III founded I.R.S. Records and his younger brother Stewart Copeland is the drummer in The Police. His younger sister Lorraine (nicknamed "Lennie") is a writer and producer.

After a wayward youth growing up in the Middle East, where he was part of a gang involved in petty crime, Copeland enlisted in the U.S. Army in 1967 at the height of the Vietnam War. He was assigned to the 1st Infantry Division and was promoted to the rank of sergeant at age 19. He served with distinction and was awarded the Bronze Star Medal amongst other decorations. It was during his tour of duty in Vietnam that he earned the nickname "Leroy Coolbreeze". Although Copeland later had misgivings about the Vietnam War, he was proud to have fought for his country.

== Music industry ==
Copeland began his career in the music industry with the help of his brother Miles, first as a tour manager for Wishbone Ash, and then as a booking agent in London at John Sherry Enterprises, where he discovered the Average White Band and other artists. In 1977, he moved to Macon, Georgia, to work for the Paragon Booking Agency booking tours for rock groups. Ian and Miles developed a strategy of using small venues and clubs to break the British band Squeeze in the North American market, a formula they would repeat with other bands. Around this time he also helped his brother Stewart write the lyrics of the song "Nothing Achieving", which became the B-side of The Police's first single "Fall Out". Although officially uncredited, Copeland also contributed lyrics to Stewart Copeland's single "Too Kool to Kalypso" and The Police's "Dead End Job".

In 1979, Copeland founded Frontier Booking International (FBI) in New York, a talent agency that represented many of the premier new wave acts of the 1980s, including the B-52's, The Cure, The Police, Simple Minds, The Beat (UK), and The Go-Go's. The agency grew to include hundreds of diverse musical performers on its roster (including the Buzzcocks, Nine Inch Nails, Concrete Blonde, The Mission, Iggy Pop, General Public, Charlie Peacock, Let's Active, R.E.M., Sting, and Morrissey), as well as representing actors. The music division of FBI was merged into InterTalent Agency in 1992, and Copeland moved to Los Angeles soon thereafter.

== Personal life ==
Copeland married Constance "Connie" Walden of Macon, and they had two daughters before divorcing.

Copeland's other romantic partners included FBI client Marianne Faithfull and actress Courteney Cox, with whom he had a three-year relationship in the 1980s after his divorce from Connie.

Along with his brothers, Stewart and Miles, Ian was honoree and recipient of the Humanitarian Award from the AMC Cancer Research Center in 1985. The awards program noted:

Seventeen years ago, the first AMC Humanitarian Award went to Judy Holliday, a brilliant musical star and actress. Tonight, we are proud to continue the tradition and honor Miles, Ian, and Stewart Copeland and their famous, and oftentimes infamous, contributions to the music and entertainment industry. Early in each of their individual careers, the Copeland Brothers were considered mavericks – the new frontiersman. Miles, attending to music management; Ian, involved as a music agent; and, Stewart, a talented composer, engaged as a drummer in The Police – all were iconoclasts. While they were bucking the established institution, practices and attitudes of the music industry, they were on the cutting edge of pioneering "new music" into the United States. Their methods, once scorned, are now imitated. It is fitting that we pay tribute to the Copeland Brothers and their pioneering spirit.

Copeland published an autobiography, Wild Thing in 1995. In 1997 he opened the Backstage Cafe bar and restaurant in Beverly Hills which he owned and operated until his death from melanoma at age 57. His funeral was held at House of Blues on Sunset Boulevard in Los Angeles.

== Bibliography ==
- Copeland, Ian. Wild Thing: The Backstage, On the Road, In the Studio, Off the Charts Memoirs of Ian Copeland. Simon & Schuster, 1995. ISBN 978-0684815084.
