= Frank Fenter =

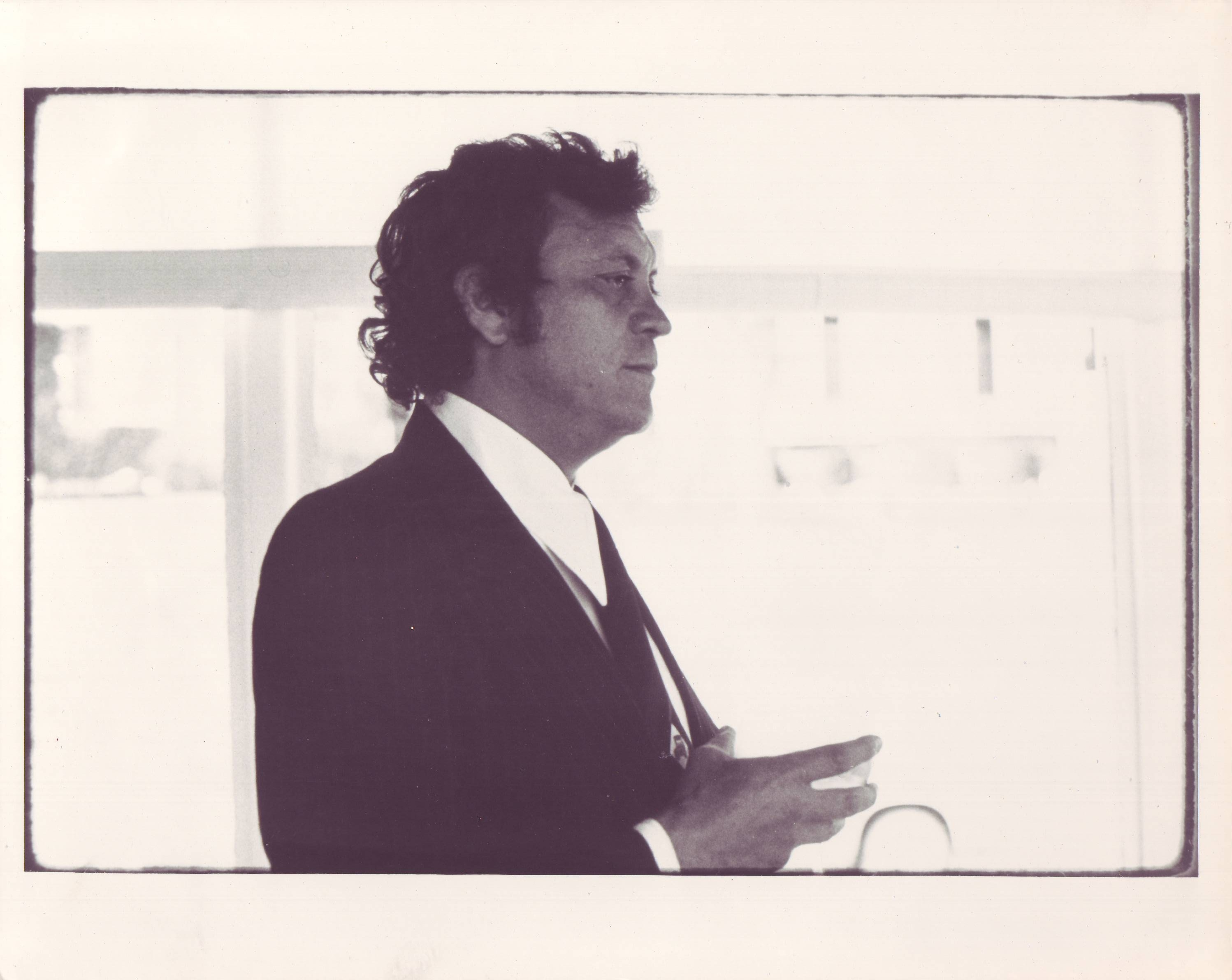
- Frank Fenter c. 1976

Background information
- Birth name: Frank Fenter
- Born: February 25, 1936; Johannesburg, South Africa
- Origin: Johannesburg, South Africa
- Died: July 21, 1983 (aged 47); Macon, Georgia
- Genres: Southern Rock, Rhythm and Blues and British Rock
- Occupation(s): impresario, music manager, record executive, record label co-founder and partner, record producer, actor
- Years active: 1958–1983
- Labels: Capricorn Records, Atlantic Records, Fast Forward Productions, Zip Code Productions, Chapell Music Publishing Co., Liberty-Imperial Record Publishing, ARC/Chess Music.

Frank Fenter (February 25, 1936 – July 21, 1983) was a South African music industry executive.

Fenter was the first managing director of Atlantic Records for Europe, where he helped discover and get signed to Atlantic late-1960s British Invasion groups, including Led Zeppelin and the progressive rock bands Yes and King Crimson. Frank Fenter was also instrumental in introducing and breaking Rhythm and Blues music across Europe, with such artists as Otis Redding and Sam and Dave. He went on in the 1970s to be a co-founder, co-owner, partner and executive vice president of Capricorn Records, the label identified with Southern Rock, led by The Allman Brothers, The Marshall Tucker Band, Wet Willie and Elvin Bishop. In 2014, Frank Fenter was posthumously Inducted into The Georgia Music Hall of Fame.

== Early career in London, England. 1958 to 1966 ==
Frank Fenter was born in Johannesburg, South Africa, and moved to London, England, in 1958, at the age of 22, initially determined to become an actor. Fenter's acting career included a feature role in the BBC's 1963 The Big Pull; in 1964, he produced, co-wrote and acted in Africa Shakes, the first South African rock movie, which featured Fenter's music act Bill Kimber and the Couriers. The movie was the first to have an interracial cast in Apartheid South Africa.

While doing part-time acting, Fenter began to book bands around London in the early 1960s, including The Rolling Stones, The Animals and Manfred Mann, long before they had recording contracts. Fenter got his first big break in the music industry in 1964, when he joined Chapell Music Publishing Co.; he went on to head Liberty-Imperial Record Publishing and later ARC/Chess Music.

== Atlantic Records. London, England. 1966 to 1969 ==
In 1966, Frank Fenter was chosen by Atlantic Records partner Nesuhi Ertegun to head the label in the United Kingdom. Within six months, Frank Fenter was the managing director in charge of Atlantic Records' operations in all of Europe. Fenter was responsible for making Atlantic Records "the most important American label in promoting British music", according to the late Ahmet Ertegun, co-founder and Chairman of Atlantic Records and The Rock and Roll Hall of Fame, who went on to say, "We wound up with quite a lot of British bands, due in large part to the fact that we had put Frank Fenter in charge of all Atlantic Records activity in Europe" In Frank Fenter's capacity and role as managing director of Atlantic Records European Operations, he played a vital role in having brought Led Zeppelin to Atlantic Records and helped discover and sign such British progressive-rock groups as Yes and King Crimson.

According to Ahmet Ertegun, Frank Fenter was also "instrumental in breaking Rhythm and Blues music throughout Europe", having brought the legendary "Hit the Road Stax" tour abroad in the spring of 1967; the tour included the acts Otis Redding, Sam and Dave and Booker T and the MGs. At the start of the European tour, according to renowned producer, Tom Dowd, Fenter suggested he record the live concerts and, with Frank Fenter's direction, Stax Records, a label affiliated with Atlantic Records, experienced a sales jump, with seven of the eleven albums recorded live on the European tour received gold certifications.

== Capricorn Records. Macon, Georgia. 1969 to 1983 ==
In 1970, Frank Fenter and Phil Walden, former co-manager of Otis Redding, Sam and Dave, and other Stax artists, formed Capricorn Records with a distribution deal from Atlantic Records. Working with Phil Walden and Jerry Wexler, Frank Fenter negotiated the Capricorn deal with his mentor, Ahmet Ertegun Frank Fenter and Phil Walden envisioned a new kind of record company structure that would be vertically integrated. Capricorn Records would have loosely held subsidiary companies that encompassed all facets of the music business, including artist management, with Phil Walden and Associates; a booking agency, the Paragon Agency; a music publishing house, No Exit Music; and artist merchandising, with the Great Southern Company.

Frank Fenter took the helm of Capricorn Records while Phil Walden focused on artist management where they together pioneered and popularized the music genre known as Southern Rock. At the height of Capricorn Record's success, Fortune magazine, the business periodical, went on to recognize Fenter as a "Promotional Genius". Singly or together, the two partners discovered and signed such recording artists as The Allman Brothers, The Marshall Tucker Band, Elvin Bishop, Wet Willie, Sea Level, The Dixie Dregs, Jonathan Edwards, Billy Thorpe, Stillwater and Alex Taylor and eventually made Capricorn Records one of the most successful independent recording companies in America.

Capricorn Records declared bankruptcy in late 1979, but, in 1983, Capricorn Records was restructured and ready to forge a comeback, however, in the middle of negotiating a distribution deal with Mo Ostin, the chairman of Warner Bros. Records, Fenter died of a heart attack in the Capricorn office; and with his death, the deal with Warner Bros. fell apart.
