= Tommy Talton =

American guitarist (1949–2023)

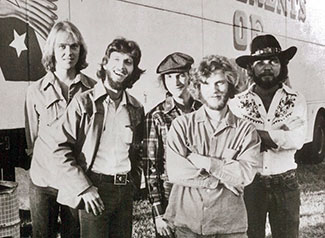
- Talton (first from right) as part of the rock band "Cowboy" in the 1970s

Background information
- Born: January 9, 1949; Orlando, Florida, U.S.
- Died: December 28, 2023 (aged 74)
- Genres: Country rock, jam, Americana, Southern rock
- Occupation: Musician
- Instrument: Guitar
- Years active: 1966–2023
- Labels: Capricorn, RCA, HittinTheNote Records, Tommy Talton Music
- Website: www.tommytaltonmusic.com

Tommy Talton (January 9, 1949 – December 28, 2023) was an American guitarist who was a member of the rock groups Cowboy and We the People. He was also noted for playing and recording with Gregg Allman, Paul Butterfield, the Allman Brothers Band, Bonnie Bramlett, Clarence Carter, Corky Laing, Billy Joe Shaver, Dickey Betts, Kitty Wells, Martin Mull and Johnny Rivers.

== Biography ==
In the 1950s, Tommy Talton was exposed to the music of Elvis Presley. When he was eight, Talton became interested in the guitar when he saw an instrument owned by one of his uncles and plucked one of the strings. Talton ultimately learned to play the instrument when he was 13. In 1966, Talton joined We the People, and left the group when he was 18. In 1969, Talton met up with Scott Boyer, Chuck Leavell, and Bill Stewart in California and formed the band Cowboy. Talton had been close friends with guitarist Duane Allman and went on to play with Gregg Allman on his first tour as a solo artist, as well as acoustic guitar on the Allman Brothers Band song "Pony Boy" on their album, Brothers and Sisters. Talton also made an appearance on Dickey Betts' Highway Call.

Beginning in 2008, he released six solo albums — In Europe: Someone Else's Shoes; Live Notes From Athens; Let's Get Outta Here; Until After Then; Somewhere South of Eden; and Distant Light (Live Acoustic) — plus Live at the NuttHouse, a collaborative album with his Cowboy co-leader Scott Boyer.

In 1994, Talton relocated to Luxembourg where he lived for nine years. He died on December 28, 2023, at the age of 74.
