= Stillwater (band) =

Rock band from the United States

- Origin: Warner Robins, Georgia, United States
- Genres: Southern rock
- Years active: 1973–1984; 1996–1998
- Label: Capricorn Records
- Past members: Michael Causey; Rob Roy Walker; Bobby Golden; Al Scarborough; Mark Percy (backup singer); Bob Spearman; Jimmy Hall; Sebie Lacey; David Heck

Stillwater was an American band, based in Warner Robins, Georgia, that played Southern rock and was active, initially from 1973 to 1984 and then also during 1996. They released two albums on Capricorn Records, Stillwater (1977; containing "Mind Bender", which peaked at number 46 on the Billboard Hot 100 in February 1978), and I Reserve the Right (1978), before the label folded in 1979. Drummer David Heck joined Stillwater in 1981; they released the album Runnin' Free in 1996.

== Band members ==
- Mike Causey – guitar
- Bobby Golden – guitar, backing vocals
- Rob Roy Walker – guitar, backing and lead vocals
- Jimmy Hall – percussion, lead and backing vocals (not the Jimmy Hall who sang lead for Wet Willie, another southern rock band signed to Capricorn in the 1970's)
- Bob Spearman – keyboards, backing vocals (died 2002)
- Al Scarborough – bass guitar, backing vocals
- Sebie Lacey – drums, backing and lead vocals
- Ken Kelly – guitar
- David Heck – drums

== Discography ==
=== Albums ===
- Stillwater (1977)
- I Reserve the Right! (1978)
- Runnin' Free (1998)

=== Singles ===
- "Mind Bender" (1977)
- "I Reserve the Right" (1978)
- "Women (Beautiful Women)" (1979)
