= Johnny Sandlin =

- Birth name: John Everett Sandlin Jr.
- Born: April 16, 1945 Decatur, Alabama, U.S.
- Died: September 19, 2017 (aged 72) Decatur, Alabama, U.S.
- Genres: Southern rock
- Occupation(s): Audio engineer, record producer
- Labels: Capricorn Records, Criteria Studios, Duck Tape Music

John Everett Sandlin Jr. (April 16, 1945 – September 19, 2017) was an American recording engineer and record producer. He is best known for producing albums by bands such as the Allman Brothers Band, Widespread Panic, Wet Willie, and Col. Bruce Hampton and the Aquarium Rescue Unit.

== Life and career ==
Sandlin was born in Decatur, Alabama, and attended Athens State University. Sandlin began his music career as a guitar player in The Impacts, a band he co-founded while attending Decatur High and went on to become the drummer of The Five Minutes, was a member of Hour Glass alongside Duane and Gregg Allman, and recorded as a session musician in Miami, playing drums, bass, and guitar. He began producing albums with Johnny Jenkins' Ton-Ton Macoute! (1970), and went on to mix At Fillmore East (1971) and Eat a Peach (1972), and produce Brothers and Sisters (1973), and Win, Lose or Draw (1975). He worked with a variety of other bands, including the Athens, Georgia-based band Widespread Panic on their sophomore album, Mom's Kitchen.

== Death ==
Sandlin died of cancer in Decatur, Alabama, at the age of 72.

== Awards and honors ==
- 2016 Alabama Music Hall of Fame inductee
