= Phil Walden =

American music executive (1940–2006)

- Born: January 11, 1940; Greenville, South Carolina, United States
- Died: April 23, 2006 (aged 66); Atlanta, Georgia, United States
- Education: Mercer University
- Occupations: Record company founder, talent manager

Phil Walden (January 11, 1940 – April 23, 2006) was the American co-founder of the Macon, Georgia-based Capricorn Records, along with former Atlantic Records executive Frank Fenter.

== Biography ==
Walden received his undergraduate degree in economics from Macon's Mercer University (where he was a member of Phi Delta Theta and a ROTC cadet) in 1962. He served as Otis Redding's manager from 1959 until Redding's death in 1967. While a college student, he began his career as a booking agent and manager for R&B acts, hosting one of Redding's first shows at the University's Phi Delta Theta lodge in the early 1960s.

As he continued to build his business, Walden was commissioned as a second lieutenant in the United States Army through a deferred service program in the summer of 1963. He recruited his younger brother, Alan (then a sophomore at Mercer), to run Phil Walden Artists and Promotions and served in Germany as a personnel officer before returning to the company following the completion of his service in 1965. That year, Redding and Phil Walden co-founded the Redwal Music publishing company.

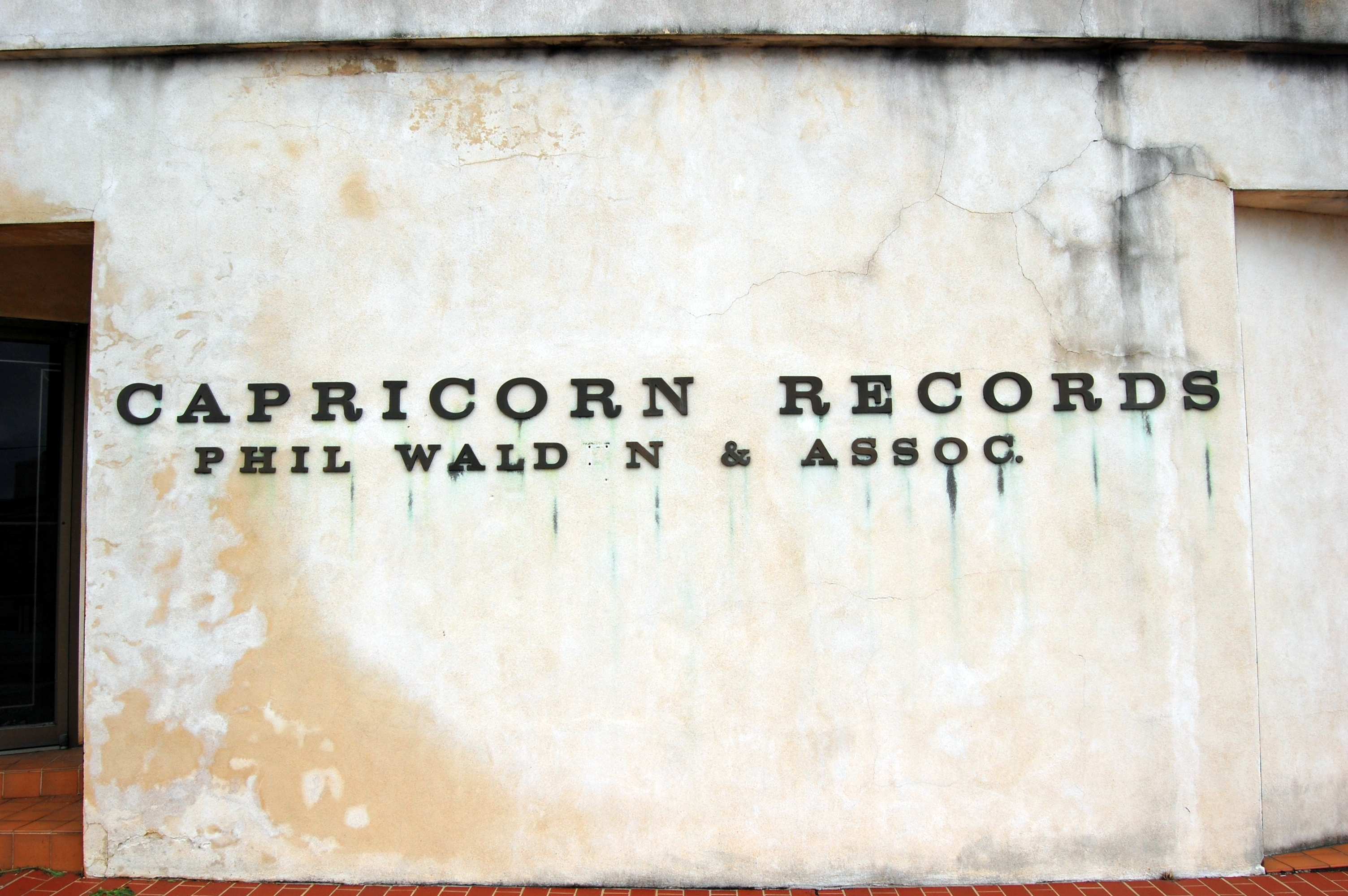
Capricorn headquarters, Macon, 2009

Walden's management of Redding and dozens of notable R&B acts in the 1960s (including Al Green, Sam & Dave and Percy Sledge) led to his early affiliation with Atlantic Records co-founder/producer Jerry Wexler, who specialized in the genre. Working with Wexler, Walden and Frank Fenter, who had run Atlantic Records' European offices in London, established Capricorn, an independent production outlet distributed by Atlantic/Atco Records and named for Wexler and Walden's astrological sign in Macon in 1969. Walden met guitarist Duane Allman (then under contract to Rick Hall, owner of FAME Studios) through Wexler and set about making him a star in his own right, precipitating the formation of The Allman Brothers Band.

The Allman Brothers Band were not an instant success, selling just 33,000 copies of their debut album, which stalled at No. 188 in the Billboard 200. However, the breakthrough of 1970's Idlewild South (which peaked at No. 38) and the 1971 live double set At Fillmore East (which peaked at No. 13 and ultimately attained a RIAA platinum certification) convinced Walden to end Capricorn's affiliation with Atlantic and move to Warner Bros. Records. The success of the Allmans led Capricorn to become the crucible of the blues-, soul- and country-based "Southern rock" subgenre that permeated the epoch; at its peak, the label's roster also featured Allman Brothers Band spinoff group Sea Level, The Marshall Tucker Band, Elvin Bishop, Wet Willie, Bonnie Bramlett, White Witch, Hydra, Grinderswitch and the Dixie Dregs. The label belied its reputation by also signing such outliers as Alex Taylor (the elder brother of James Taylor), traditional country musician Kitty Wells, soul singer Dobie Gray and vanguard hard rock ensemble Captain Beyond (whose second album was produced by Walden).

In spite of the label's notable imprimatur, a later distribution agreement with Polygram (contingent on the label's assets as collateral for a multi-million dollar "runway" loan) ended in 1979 when Polygram called in the remaining balance of the loan. After declaring bankruptcy in October 1979, the initial iteration of Capricorn Records folded a year later.

Redding's death in a 1967 plane crash was a huge blow to Walden, who had enjoyed a close friendship with the singer since adolescence. He suffered another devastating loss in 1971, when Duane Allman died in a motorcycle crash. Yet Walden soldiered on, creating a small empire in Macon with the label, a recording facility, real estate holdings and other ventures. In 1976, Walden and the Allman Brothers Band played an integral role in financing Jimmy Carter's presidential campaign throughout the primary season. However, as the label entered a fallow period in the late 1970s due to the dissolution of the Allman Brothers Band and the decline of Southern rock as a cultural force, Walden could not acclimate to the ascent of post-punk and new wave music, refusing the opportunity to build relationships with such prospective British signees as Squeeze, Dire Straits and Gang of Four; instead, the latter two groups were signed by Wexler (who had left Atlantic in 1975) to Warner Brothers.

Walden dropped out of sight during the 1980s, struggling with cocaine and alcohol dependencies and other setbacks. When he returned to artist management, his anchor was not a rock band but comic actor Jim Varney, whose "Hey Vern" commercials made him a hillbilly icon and the star of a string of movies. During this period, Walden also met struggling actor/screenwriter Billy Bob Thornton, serving as his manager for several years.

In 1991, Walden relaunched Capricorn in Nashville, Tennessee via a joint venture with Warner Brothers. The label's first signing was the Athens, Georgia-based jam band Widespread Panic. The label made several changes in partners and ended up at Mercury Records, due to the enthusiasm then-Mercury president Danny Goldberg had for the Capricorn roster, which had grown to include such diverse acts as 311, CAKE, Sonia Dada, the reconstituted Lynyrd Skynyrd and Allman Brothers Band spinoff Gov't Mule. Walden was also the first to sign then-unknown country singer Kenny Chesney. After reading an article about a memorial ceremony for blues guitarist Robert Johnson in Billboard in September 1991, Walden contacted Mount Zion Memorial Fund founder Skip Henderson (who had produced that event) and commissioned a bronze sculpture mounted on a granite headstone in honor of Elmore James, whose catalog was then owned by Capricorn. The memorial was placed on James' grave in the Newport Baptist Church Cemetery in Ebenezer, Mississippi on December 10, 1992. Several members of the Mississippi state legislature attended the event along with Walden, members of James' family and many others.

In 2000, Walden sold the majority of Capricorn's catalog. In the early 2000s, with the Capricorn name retired, Walden tried his hand with another startup label, Velocette. The entire staff was made up of Waldens, including his son, Philip Jr., daughter, Amantha, and nephew, Jason.

Walden was inducted into the Georgia Music Hall of Fame in 1986.

He died of cancer at the age of 66 in his home in Atlanta, Georgia on April 22, 2006. "Phil was one of the preeminent producers of great music in America," former president Jimmy Carter said in a statement. Walden's work with Redding, the Allmans and others, Carter said, "helped to put Macon and Georgia on the musical map of the world."
