= Capricorn Records =

Defunct independent record label

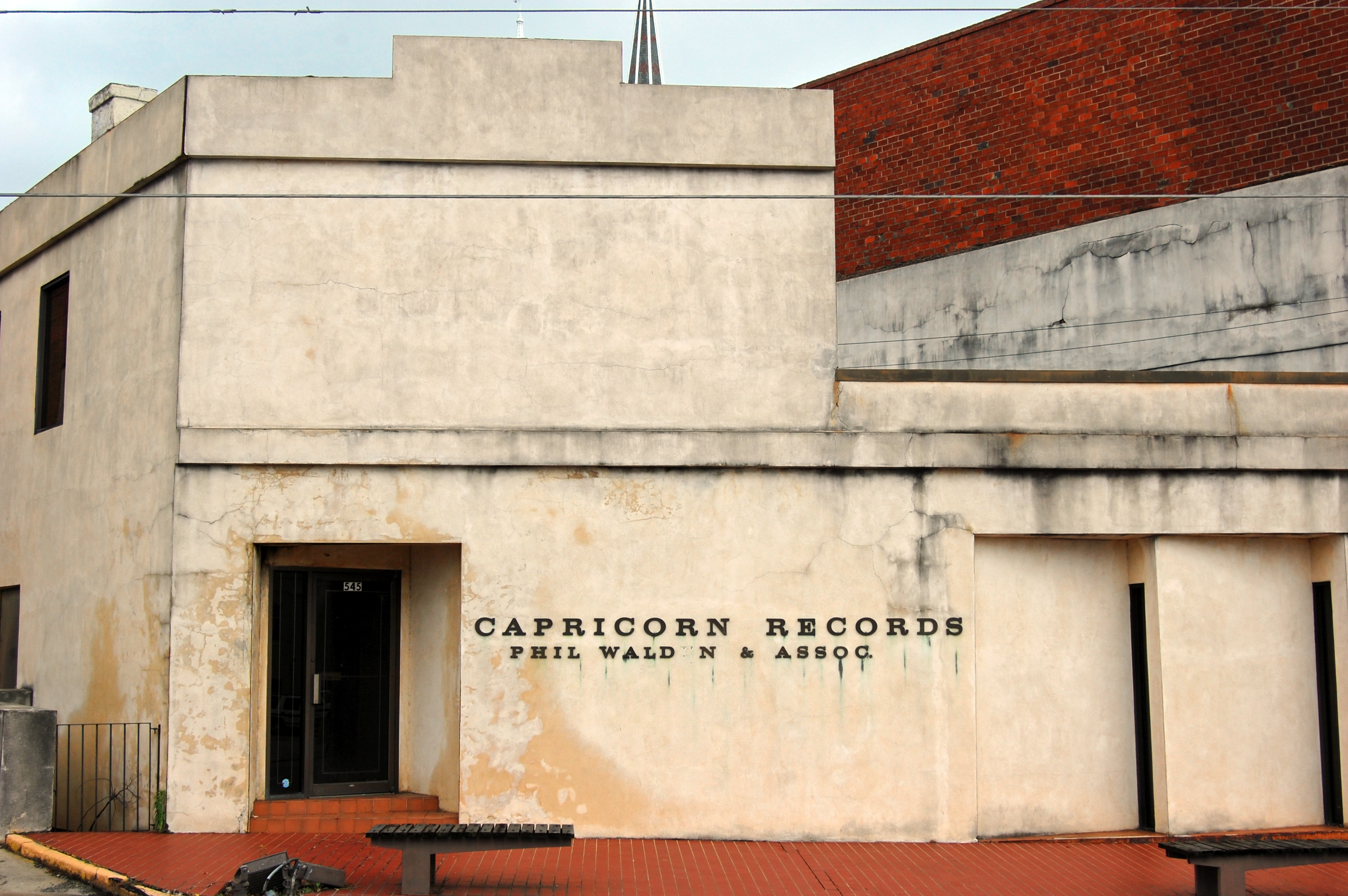
- Parent company: Universal Music Group (first incarnation catalogue); Sony Music Entertainment (second incarnation catalogue)
- Founded: 1969; 57 years ago
- Founder: Phil Walden, Frank Fenter
- Defunct: 2000; 26 years ago
- Status: Sold to Volcano Entertainment: Defunct
- Distributors: First Incarnation; Atlantic Records (1969 - 1972); Warner Bros. Records (1972 - 1977); PhonoDisc (1977 - 1979); Second Incarnation; RED Distribution; PolyGram; The Island Def Jam Music Group; Reissues; Island Records/UMe (first incarnation catalogue); Volcano Entertainment/Legacy Recordings (second incarnation catalogue)
- Genre: Southern rock; soul; jazz fusion; country; alternative rock
- Country of origin: U.S.
- Location: Macon, Georgia

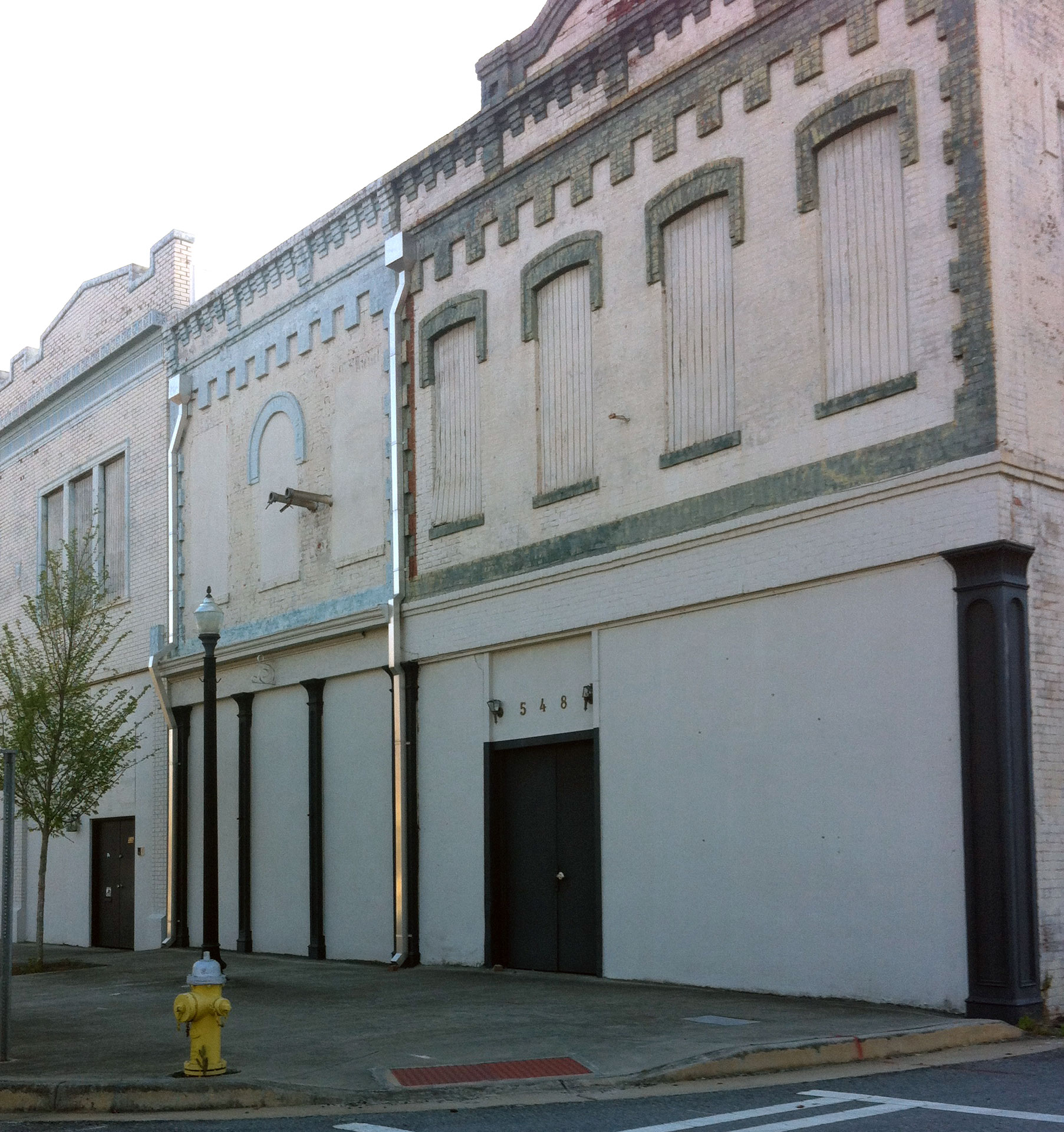
Capricorn Sound Studios in 2014.

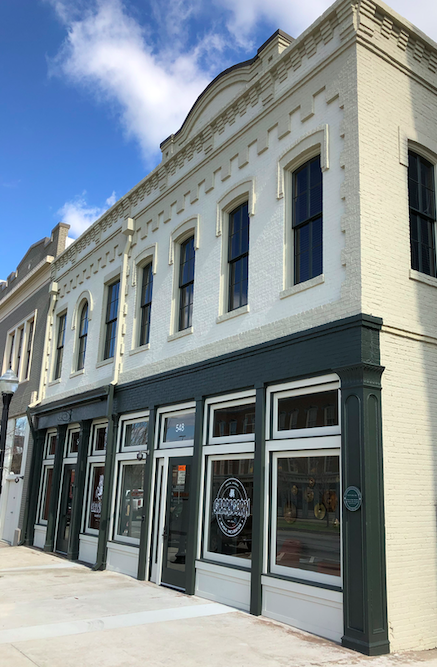
Exterior of the newly renovated Mercer Music at Capricorn in 2020.

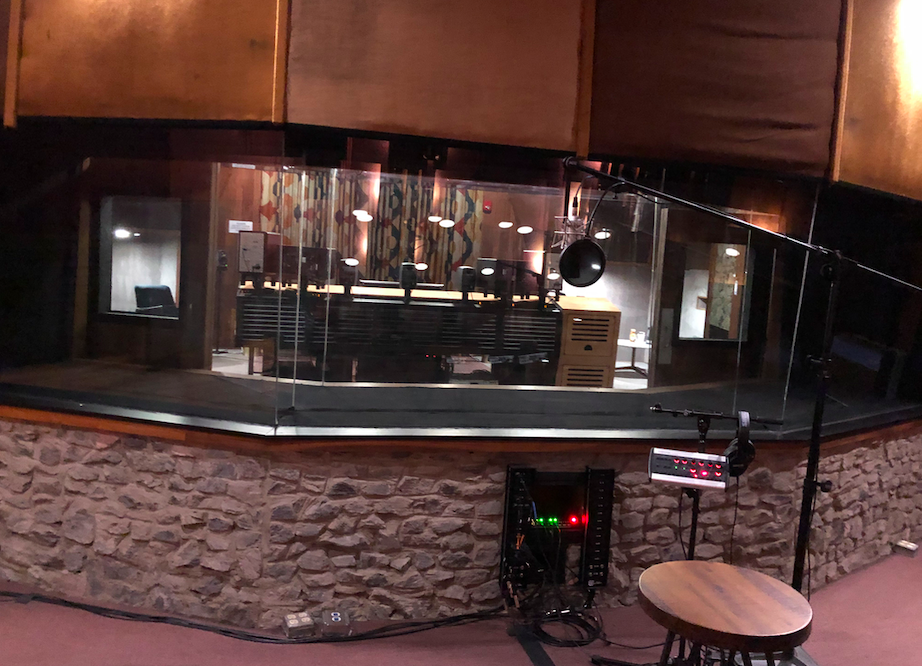
The view of the Capricorn Studio control room from standing inside Studio A. Little has changed in both the studio space and control room since 1972.

Capricorn Records was an independent record label founded by Phil Walden and Frank Fenter in 1969 in Macon, Georgia. Capricorn Records is best known for helping launch the careers of Otis Redding and the Allman Brothers Band.

== History ==
=== Label and studio founding ===
In the early 60s, Phil Walden and his brother Alan Walden had made a family business of managing and representing Rhythm and blues (R&B) performers including Otis Redding, Sam & Dave, Al Green, and Percy Sledge. As Redding's fame grew internationally, the partners founded Redwal Music, purchased a four-building block in downtown Macon, and opened a small office space a few blocks away on Cotton Avenue. After Otis Redding's death in 1967, Phil Walden continued their shared dream for a recording studio, but the initial plan for an R&B driven label no longer held its original appeal without Redding.

Walden and Frank Fenter approached Vice President of Atlantic Records Jerry Wexler about funding the project. Wexler liked Walden's idea of a studio with studio musicians but thought the studio should also include a record label. They decided to call the label and studio “Capricorn” after their shared astrological sign. With a monetary investment from Wexler and a distribution deal with Atlantic Records, Capricorn Records was close to completion in 1969 with a production deal with Atlantic Records. Walden began looking for talent, both musicians and engineers.

=== First incarnation: the 1970s ===
Between the time Redding and the Walden brothers purchased the studio property and Phil Walden's partnership with Wexler, the studio was called the Otis Redding Memorial Studio. Under both names, the space blended into its surroundings and from the outside looked like an old, abandoned storefront with no outside signage among other similarly vacant buildings. The inside of the space was reminiscent of a warehouse – high ceilings and open space.

Jim Hawkins originally designed the main recording studio, and a redesign followed in 1972 by Tom Hidley. According to docents at the Mercer Music at Capricorn, the Hidley redesign changed the studio walls from soundproof tiles to walls with a fabric-covered upper half and a stone and wood bottom half. Strips of cedar shingles placed strategically throughout the room covered lights and further diffused sound. Four echo chambers built under the studio connected directly to the control room to create popular vocal and instrumental echo effects.

Musicians remember the atmosphere of the studio referring to it as “home” or recollecting that anything could happen or anyone could stop by. Elvin Bishop called Capricorn Records "the only thing happening in town that was different from anything in a thousand other towns around the South at the time".

Walden planned to model the studio after Stax Records and FAME Studios by offering an intimate recording experience with state-of-the-art equipment and a backing studio band. The Capricorn Rhythm Section provided a distinctive full-band sound to artists or on tracks needing accompaniment. Often referred to as CRS, the studio band members were drummer Johnny Sandlin, keyboardist Paul Hornsby, guitarist Pete Carr, and bassist Robert “Pops” Powell.

When it came time to start recruiting talent, Walden tracked down Duane Allman, a guitarist who he heard on a FAME Studios recording of Wilson Pickett's cover of "Hey Jude," ultimately purchasing Allman's contract. Allman would go on to help Walden build what would become the Allman Brothers Band. Though the Allman Brothers' 1969 self-titled first release wasn't a best-seller, critics praised the effort for its mixing of country, jazz, blues, and rock genres. Music historians cite the group's third release, At Fillmore East, as the impetus of the rise of southern rock as a popular music genre. At Fillmore East was the first gold album for both the band and label. The partnership would garner more top-charting releases with Eat a Peach, Brothers and Sisters, and Win, Lose or Draw.

Between the years of 1969 and 1979, Capricorn produced nine platinum albums, seventeen gold albums, and five gold singles. Other Capricorn-signed artists had chart-topping songs and albums, but the studio also held sessions for other artists including Razzy Bailey, Martin Mull, the Charlie Daniels Band, and Livingston Taylor.

Other notable Capricorn artists during this era included:

- Bonnie Bramlett
- The Cooper Brothers
- Cowboy
- Delbert McClinton
- Dixie Dregs
- Grinderswitch
- Hydra
- Kitty Wells
- The Marshall Tucker Band
- Percy Sledge
- Sea Level
- Stillwater
- Wet Willie
- White Witch

=== End of an era ===
When Warner Brothers could not successfully negotiate a buyout of the label in 1975, Capricorn made a new distribution deal with PolyGram. In the following year Capricorn's most successful and prolific act, the Allman Brothers Band, would split up.

The 1970s recession affected Capricorn record sales, especially later in the decade. Between July and September 1979, the label faced numerous foreclosure and debt charges including a possible buyout and contract renegotiation from PolyGram forcing the label to close its Los Angeles office and cut positions in Macon. When renegotiations were unsuccessful, PolyGram filed a lawsuit seeking all label and studio assets as collateral on a $5 million loan made to the company in 1977.

At this point, many artists terminated their contracts with Capricorn including Sea Level, Stillwater, and Dixie Dregs and the Allman Brothers filed suit to stop the release of a greatest hits album.

Together, Chapter 11 bankruptcy proceedings and the reorganization of Capricorn Records took a total of 18 months. The reorganization allowed Walden to retain the label name, studio, Cotton Avenue office, and both Rear Exit and No Exit Music Companies. Polygram received all master recordings, musical copyrights, existing tapes, records, and other property. Another stipulation of the final agreement was the creation of a special fund to pay off other creditors over the next seven years. Walden received 100% of the company stock after reorganization, leaving Fenter out.

In January, 1983, Walden and Fenter restructured their business partnership and announced that Capricorn was releasing its first record in three years with the CBS Columbia Label album Sweet Young Thing by Rick Christian. The album did not revive the label's name recognition as Walden and Fenter had hoped, but neither partner was deterred. Fenter made an attempt in July 1983 to revive the label, but that effort dissolved when he had a heart attack in the midst of completing negotiations with Warner Bros. Records and died at 47.

A Capricorn Records liquidation sale event at the Macon Coliseum in the summer of 1986 saw the sale of assets including gold records, personal effects, and filing cabinets containing financial documents, press, and promotional pieces, and contracts.

=== Second incarnation: the 1990s ===
The label relaunched in Nashville, Tennessee, as a joint venture with Warner Brothers, this time through the partnership of Walden and his son. The first act to sign onto the resurrected label was Athens, Georgia's, Widespread Panic, who released their first album on the label in the summer of 1991.

Cake and 311 were the most commercially successful artists to come out of Capricorn during this period with Cake's third album Prolonging the Magic going platinum and 311's Soundsystem going gold. Capricorn's Nashville division signed a then-unknown Kenny Chesney, while the Atlanta division signed various rock acts including jam band favorites like Gov't Mule and Col. Bruce Hampton and the Aquarium Rescue Unit.

Throughout the label's run in the 1990s, distribution changed from Sony Music's independent RED Distribution network to PolyGram by way of its flagship label Mercury Records. In 1997, Capricorn closed its Nashville office moving all operations to its downtown Atlanta office. Walden sold Capricorn to Volcano Records in 2000 for $13 million and began work on a new independent label project, Velocette Records, which featured Georgia artists including Vic Chesnutt, Kevn Kinney, and Jucifer.

=== Studio renovation and reopening ===
In 2010, the Georgia Trust for Historic Preservation listed the Capricorn Recording Studio among its annual “Places in Peril.” Leading up to this announcement, the Capricorn Sound Studios sat vacant during the decades after the label declared bankruptcy, surviving a fire that destroyed neighboring buildings. The studio remained untouched while the rest of the property fell into further disrepair throughout the early 2000s. Studio tours were available to fans through special reservations as featured in an episode of NPR's All Things Considered.

In 2015, a multi-million dollar renovation project through a partnership between Mercer University, NewTown Macon, Sierra Development, and Southern Pines Plantations announced plans to fully restoring the original studio space, early plans included a large recording studio for film score and orchestral recordings, a Capricorn museum, and loft apartments on the upper floors.

While the record label is defunct, the legacy of Capricorn lives on through Mercer Music at Capricorn. On December 3, 2019, on the 50th anniversary of the original studio opening, the original studio space reopened. Grants from the Peyton Anderson Foundation and John S. and James L. Knight Foundation along with historic tax credits and donations made up the $4.3 million project's funding.

In addition to the loft apartments on the upper floors, the four-building remodel includes a small bar and lounge-style entrance, a museum with interactive kiosks, a music incubator space designed for musicians to collaborate creatively or store equipment, rental office space, and two recording studio spaces. Studio B is both a performance venue and large studio space designed acoustically for choirs, orchestral recording, and film scoring. Studio A, the original historic Capricorn recording studio, remains unchanged from Hidley's 1972 studio redesign. The main control room remains mostly unchanged except for a custom 40-channel API console based on the original soundboard.

== Economic and cultural impact ==
From the early to mid-1970s, Capricorn's economic impact on Macon and the surrounding area included more than just the studio and label. The southern city had gained notoriety as having a vibrant music scene, keeping small venues like Grant's Lounge, historic halls like the Grand Opera House and the Macon City Auditorium, and large venues like the Macon Coliseum filled with internationally known acts and up-and-coming talent. As a company, Capricorn invested in local real estate including Capricorn Park on Cotton Avenue.

Further putting Macon and Capricorn Records in the spotlight was Phil Walden's involvement in the 1976 presidential campaign of then Georgia governor Jimmy Carter. Capricorn label bands including the Allman Brothers Band and Marshall Tucker Band played rallies and benefit concerts and Carter chose "The South's Gonna Do It" by the Charlie Daniels Band to be his campaign song.

Walden's interest in politics wasn't the only activity bringing attention to his company or hometown. His annual Barbecue and Summer Games held at his lakeside home from 1972 to 1978, attracted both fans and stars. Notable attendees throughout the years included Carter, Don King, Bette Midler, and Andy Warhol.

Internationally, a special production of the Old Grey Whistle Test called "Macon Whoopee" featured performances by the Marshall Tucker Band, Wet Willie, Bonnie Bramlett, Stillwater, and others.

== See also ==
- Albums released on Capricorn Records
- List of record labels
- Paragon Booking Agency

== Other sources ==
- Sippel, John (January 29, 1983) " Together Again, Capricorn Records President Phil Walden and label Executive Vice President Frank Fenter".Billboard. Billboard
- Woodward, Garret (December 8, 2019) "Inside Capricorn Sound Studios, Ground Zero for Southern Rock." Rolling Stone. Inside the Rebirth of Capricorn Sound Studios, Ground Zero for Southern Rock
- Home website
