= Omaha Sessions =

Compilation album by 311
- Released: October 1998
- Recorded: 1988–1992, 1998
- Genre: Alternative Rock • Funk Rock • Reggae Rock• Rap Rock
- Length: 38:19
- Label: What Have You Records
- Producer: 311, J.E. Van Horne, Tom Lippold

311 chronology
Transistor (1997)	Omaha Sessions (1998)	Live (1998)

Omaha Sessions is an album released by 311 that was sold only through their website in October 1998. The album contains re-masterings of highlights from their three independent albums: Dammit!, Hydroponic, and Unity. The majority of these songs predate S.A. Martinez's full-time membership in the band; as such, he does not appear as frequently as on later albums.

== Track listing ==
All tracks are written by 311.

No.	Title	Length
1.	"Soulsucker" (new mix)	4:51
2.	"Today My Love" (new mix)	4:20
3.	"Slinky" (new mix)	5:15
4.	"Summer of Love"	5:06
5.	"Damn"	3:32
6.	"Down South"	3:29
7.	"Rollin'"	3:10
8.	"Right Now"	4:11
9.	"This Too Shall Pass" (new mix)	4:21

== Personnel ==
- Nick Hexum - rhythm guitar, vocals
- Tim Mahoney - lead guitar
- S.A. Martinez - vocals
- P-Nut - bass
- Chad Sexton - percussion, drums
- Jim Watson - guitar on "This Too Shall Pass"

== Production ==
- Producer:
  - Tracks 1–8 produced by 311 & J.E. Van Horne
  - Track 9 produced by 311 & Tom Lippold
- Mixing and Recording:
  - Tracks 1–8 by 311 & J.E. Van Horne at Rainbow Recording Studios, Omaha, NE www.rainbowmusicomaha.com
  - Track 9 by 311 & Tom Lippold at IEV Studios, Omaha, NE
  - Tracks 1, 2, 3, and 9 re-mixed by Scotch Ralston
- Re-Mastering: Joe Gastwirt at Oceanview
- Art direction & design: Pawn Shop Press
- Photography: Nils Anders Erickson President:Rainbow Recording Studios www.rainbowmusicomaha.com
