= Supermarioland =

1992 single by Ambassadors of Funk

Single by Ambassadors of Funk featuring MC Mario

from the album Super Mario Compact Disco
- Released: October 1992
- Genre: Novelty pop
- Length: 3:30
- Label: Living Beat
- Songwriters: Simon Harris; Colin Case
- Producer: Simon Harris

Audio
- "Supermarioland" (radio version) on YouTube

"Supermarioland" is a song by Ambassadors of Funk, a musical project managed by British musician Simon Harris. Vocals on the song are provided by British rapper Einstein (also known as Colin Case), who performed under the name MC Mario for the track. The song is heavily based on the music and sound effects from the 1989 platform video game Super Mario Land, developed by Nintendo and composed by Hirokazu Tanaka. Nintendo game director Shigeru Miyamoto gave permission for Harris to release the song and record an album featuring similar material.

Released in October 1992 via Harris's Living Beat sublabel, "Supermarioland" was swiftly promoted and marketed in the United Kingdom, allowing the song to reach number eight on the UK Singles Chart. The song also charted in Ireland and the Netherlands the same year. Along with Doctor Spin's "Tetris", H.W.A.'s "Supersonic" and Power-Pill's "Pac-Man", this song contributed to the brief trend of video game music entering mainstream popularity. Nintendo UK provided an actor for the song's music video, which was filmed at Chessington World of Adventures in London.

== Background ==
Simon Harris, the mastermind behind Ambassadors of Funk, explained to video game website Eurogamer that he initially had no intention to create Super Mario-themed compositions, but after his friend introduced him to Nintendo's Game Boy console, he became fond of the theme music from Super Mario Land, composed by Hirokazu Tanaka. He realised that the songs on the game's score had a similar tempo to house music, so he was able to incorporate the samples into "Supermarioland" easily, recruiting Einstein to provide the rap vocals. After Harris created the track, he contacted Nintendo to clear the music samples, and the company, liking what Harris had done, also requested that he and Einstein record an album of Super Mario material. Nintendo UK quickly began to promote and market "Supermarioland", even providing an actor for the music video, but Nintendo of America was difficult to contact, and the track was not released in the United States until 1993. Mario's designer, Shigeru Miyamoto, approved the project, and the album, titled Super Mario Compact Disco, was released in Japan in August 1993, featuring tracks from other Mario games such as Super Mario Bros. 3, Super Mario World, and Super Mario Kart.

== Release and promotion ==
Living Beat, a sublabel of Harris's Music of Life label, released "Supermarioland" in the United Kingdom in October 1992. On 25 October, the song debuted at number 14 on the UK Singles Chart, taking two weeks to rise to its peak of number eight. The song spent five more weeks on the chart before dropping out, and at the end of 1992, Music Week ranked it at number 97 on the UK year-end chart. In Ireland, the song debuted on the Irish Singles Chart in November and peaked at number 22. The song also charted in the Netherlands, reaching number 69 in December and spend five weeks on the Single Top 100. On the Eurochart Hot 100, the song peaked at number 35 on 17 November. In Australia, "Supermarioland" was released on 16 November 1992 and reached number 126 on the ARIA Singles Chart two weeks later. This song, along with "Tetris" by Doctor Spin, "Supersonic" by H.W.A. and "Pac-Man" by Power-Pill began a short period of recreated video game music entering mainstream popularity. The song's music video, filmed at Chessington World of Adventures in London, features Einstein and several others dancing along to the song with an actor wearing a Mario costume.

== Critical reception ==
Upon the song's release in October 1992, Computer and Video Games magazine called it "the essential item for Mario-loving ravers everywhere" and predicted it would enter the UK top 20 charts.

== Track listings ==
- Standard CD single; US 12-inch single
1. "Supermarioland" (radio version) – 3:30
2. "Supermarioland" (club house mix) – 5:15
3. "Supermarioland" (instrumental) – 5:10
4. "Supermarioland" (Daisy's breakdown) – 5:00
- UK 7-inch and cassette single
1. "Supermarioland" (radio version) – 3:30
2. "Supermarioland" (instrumental) – 5:10
- UK 12-inch single

A1. "Supermarioland" (club house mix) – 5:15
A2. "Supermarioland" (radio version) – 3:30
B1. "Supermarioland" (instrumental) – 5:10
B2. "Supermarioland" (Daisy's breakdown) – 5:00

== Charts ==
=== Weekly charts ===
Chart (1992)	Peak position
Australia (ARIA)	126
Europe (Eurochart Hot 100)	35
Ireland (IRMA)	22
Netherlands (Single Top 100)	69
UK Singles (OCC)	8
UK Airplay (Music Week)	37

=== Year-end charts ===
Chart (1992)	Position
UK Singles (OCC)	97
