= Asher D (rapper) =

British rapper

Asher D is an English rapper who was part of a successful partnership with reggae artist Daddy Freddy, known as the duo Asher D and Daddy Freddy. His name was later used by another English rapper.

== Early life and career ==
Of Jamaican ancestry, Asher D had returned from a trip to Jamaica in 1986 when he was spotted rapping on the street in Peckham and put in touch with the record label Music of Life. The label's founder, Simon Harris, who was looking for an artist who could combine reggae with hip-hop, was impressed by the rapper's ability and arranged for him to record a tune with another rapper. Unfortunately, the original rapper backed out at the last minute, and instead Harris brought in Daddy Freddy as a last minute replacement. The tune, "Ragamuffin Hip-Hop" (Music of Life, 1987), was one of the label's earliest successes and lay the foundations for a lasting partnership. The track spawned a subgenre that was also known as 'ragamuffin hip hop'.

"Ragamuffin Hip-Hop" was an instant success and picked up radio airplay in the United Kingdom, but it was the New Music Seminar in New York that broke the sound in the US, when Simon Harris (who attended as a featured panelist at the convention) gave the new record to WBLS DJ Mr. Magic, the hip-hop DJ who featured the record. The airplay on WBLS gained the attention of Run DMC's label Profile Records who released "Ragamuffin Hip Hop" in the US.

The duo recorded and released an album, also called Ragamuffin Hip-Hop (Music of Life, 1988), described by AllMusic as "a sterling blend of reggae and hip-hop", and achieved modest worldwide fame for their tunes. Their next single, "Brutality" (Music of Life, 1988) was another success and was followed by a cover version of Mungo Jerry's "In the Summertime". The duo then featured on Music of Life's album Hustlers Convention (1989) which is regarded as hip hop's first live album. Asher D was later arrested and imprisoned on drug related charges. By the time he was released, Daddy Freddy had continued as a solo artist, leaving Asher to do the same - although the pair did team up again for "We Are the Champions" (Mango Records, 1991).

Asher's first solo release was the single "Raggamuffin Darlin'" (Music of Life, 1990), which was followed by a single and album Still Kickin (Music of Life, 1991). Since then, however, he has disappeared from the spotlight, and finding out information about him since the arrival of his namesake on the scene is all the more difficult. A sample of the Asher D and Daddy Freddy song, "Raggamuffin Duo Take Charge", was used in 187 Lockdown's 1998 hit "Kung-Fu" and the Prodigy's "Take Me to the Hospital", from their 2009 album Invaders Must Die.

== Discography ==
=== Albums ===
- Ragamuffin Hip-Hop (Music of Life, 1988) - with Daddy Freddy
- Still Kickin (solo album) (Music of Life, 1991)

=== Singles ===
- "Ragamuffin Hip-Hop" (Music of Life, 1988) - with Daddy Freddy
- "Brutality" (Music of Life, 1988) - with Daddy Freddy
- "Summertime" (Music of Life, 1988) - with Daddy Freddy
- "We Are the Champions" (Chrysalis, 1989) - with Daddy Freddy
- "Ragamuffin Darlin'" (1990)

=== Compilation appearances ===
- Hustlers Convention (1989)
- Dancehall Reggae (on 2 tracks: "Like a Bike" with Prento Youth & "Still Kickin'" with Joseph Cotton) (Eurostar Schallplatten GmbH, 1992)
