= Daddy Freddy =

Jamaican ragga vocalist (born 1965)

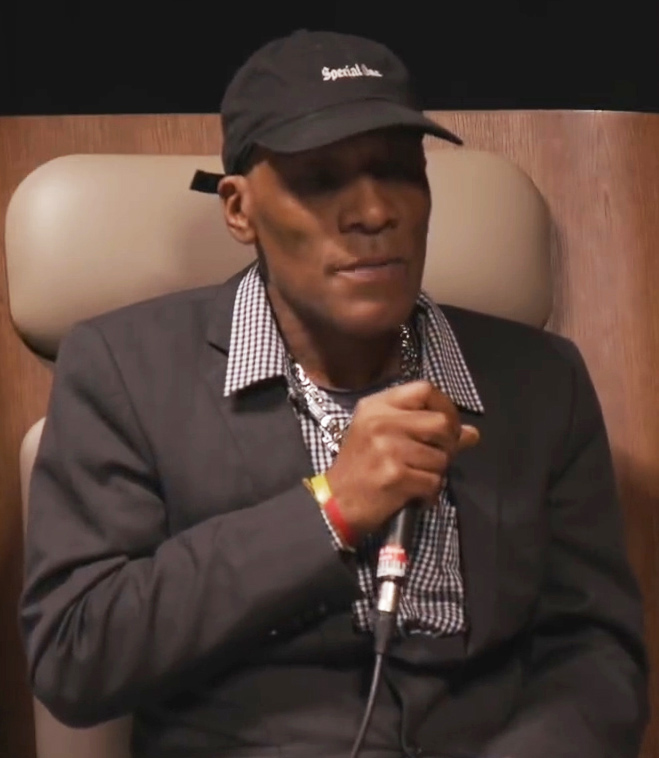
- Daddy Freddy in 2019

Background information
- Born: S. Frederick Small; 1965 (age 60–61)
- Origin: Kingston, Jamaica
- Genre: Raggamuffin
- Instrument: Vocals
- Years active: 1985–present
- Label: Chrysalis/EMI

S. Frederick Small (born 1965) and better known as Daddy Freddy, is a Jamaican ragga vocalist.

== Early life ==
Small was born in 1965, in Kingston, Jamaica, and grew up in the city's Trenchtown district. His house was a few minutes walk from Coxsone Dodd's influential record studio Studio One.

His neighbours were Jacob Miller and Ranking Joe. Ranking Joe took Freddy under his wing and taught him the basics skills of performing. Freddy's natural ability meant he was quickly enlisted to work with Lt. Stichie (of "Natty Dread" fame) and then later with Sugar Minott. It was performing on Minott's soundsystem that founded Freddy's fame in Jamaica.

He recorded his first single, "Zoo Party", in 1985 for Studio One.

== Gaining fame ==
He released his first album, Body Lasher, in 1986, and that year had six top ten hits in Jamaica, including a number one with "Joker Lover", a collaboration with Pinchers.

After successful touring in the U.S. under the Chrysalis record label, Freddy came to England in 1987. His first UK work was a collaboration with Asher D called Raggamuffin Hip-Hop. This album created a new style of music that was a fusion of Jamaican ragga and UK hip-hop. The anthemic title track has the much sampled vocal "The ragga-muffin, the ragga-muffin, hip-hop". Freddy also managed to influence and support fledgling UK reggae stars Top Cat, Tenor Fly and Prento Youth who went on to the Lloyd Coxsone Sound and the record label Congo Natty Rebel MC.

This album created even more interest for Freddy. Artists such as Dr. Dre, Cypress Hill, David Morales and Norman Cook all requested collaborations and others like the Prodigy, Meli'sa Morgan ("Through the Tears"), Salt 'n' Pepa and KRS-One all sampled his unique voice.

This fame culminated in Freddy attempting and breaking the world record for the world's fastest rapper in 1989 as part of the Capital Radio Music Festival. Eventually Freddy broke the record four times taking it from 346 to 598 syllables a minute; the first and second time in the UK (in Covent Garden and on BBC's Record Breakers show where he appeared with Roy Castle) and two times in America (New York Empire State Building and in Washington). Renowned live performances have always been Freddy's hallmark, most notably at the New Music Seminar in New York and Tim Westwood's live rap shows on Capital Radio.

He was signed to Chrysalis Records in 1991 by A&R VP Duff Marlowe, joining Gang Starr and Arrested Development as part of Marlowe's stateside re-make of the UK rock label, releasing the album Stress.

== Career break ==
By the end of the 1990s, Freddy was exhausted. His hectic life-style had taken it out of him so he found time to return to Jamaica and re-discover his roots. Whilst he still lent vocals to prominent dancehall tracks in Jamaica, his next major work did not come until he came back to the UK, with a new lease of life. Freddy teamed up with the dub producer the Rootsman in 2000 to make the new album Old School – New School (Third Eye Music).

Since then, Freddy has relocated to Bristol, England, where he has been making new music — often teaming up with Blackout JA — and recording and training dancehall artists.

== Discography ==
=== Albums ===
- Body Lasher (1986)
- Ragamuffin Hip-Hop (with Asher D) (1988)
- Cater Fe She (1989)
- Stress (1991)
- Raggamuffin Soldier (1992)
- The Big One (1994)
- Greatest Hits (1996)
- Old School New School (with the Rootsman) (2000)
- Hardcore (2004)

=== Singles ===
- "Ragamuffin Hip Hop" (with Asher D), Music of Life (1988) (Profile/Arista/BMG US)
- "Brutality" (with Asher D), Music of Life (1988)
- "Summertime" (with Asher D), Music of Life (1988)
- "We Are the Champions" (with Asher D), Chrysalis/EMI (1989)
- "Daddy Freddy's in Town", Chrysalis (1990)
- "Ragga House" (with Simon Harris), Music of Life (1990)
- "Respect", Music of Life (1990)
- "Don't Stop the Music", Living Beat Rec (1990)
- "Freddy's Back" (with Duke/Royal Family), Music of Life (1990)
- "The Crown", Music of Life (1991)
- "Haul and Pull", Chrysalis (1992)
- "Dancehall Clash" (with Tenor Fly), Live (1992)
- "Respect Due" (with Heavy D & Frankie Paul), Music of Life (1993)
- "Respect Due" (Sly & Robbie Remixes), Music of Life (1993)
- "Pain Killa", Music of Life (1994)
- "Freddy's in the Jungle" (Japanese single) (1997)
- "War" (2002)
- "Muggle" (Ragga Meridional Crew) (2007)
- "Can't Take This No More" (with the Bug), Acid Ragga/Ninja Tune (2012)
- "Ganja Baby" (with the Bug), Acid Ragga/Ninja Tune (2012)

=== Compilation and guest appearances ===
- 1989: Kreem of the Krop; songs: "Dance Hall Clash", "Must Want a Man", "Rude Boy" and "Advert"
- 1989: Hustlers Convention (Music of Life); song: "Live Jam", "The Ragamuffin Duo Take Charge", "Come Selector" and "Grand Finale"
- 1989: Silver on Black; song "London's Finest" by Simon Harris featuring Asher D and Daddy Freddy
- 1993: Music; special guest on song "Nix Hex" by 311
- 2003 Politicians and Paedophiles and Run the Place Red on the Bug album Pressure
- 2003: Smojphace EP; song "Run the Place Red (AFX Mix)"
- 2007: Vavamuffin; song "Poor People" (featuring Daddy Freddy)
- 2012 Drużyna Mistrzów compilation; song "Fi Di Youths" (Firma, Daddy Freddy & Młody Bosski)
