= MC Duke =

British rapper (died 2024)

Kashif Adham (born Anthony Hilaire, 1966 – 21 April 2024), better known by the stage name of MC Duke, was a British rapper from the East End of London. He was one of the pioneers of the early British hardcore rap sound and later went on to produce breakbeat hardcore. Throughout his career he worked with his DJ partner Leader One and was part of IC3.

== Biography ==
Originally a model and dancer, Duke began his music career at a DMC World Championships after show party, where the winner of the MC battle competition got on stage and boasted that he would beat any rapper who challenged him. Duke climbed on stage to take the challenge, and emerged victorious. The battle was witnessed by Derek Boland, who was acting as an A&R man for Music of Life records. He quickly arranged a meeting between Duke and Simon Harris, the head of the record label, where instead of bringing a demo tape, Duke rapped live in Harris' office. Harris agreed to sign him.

Duke debuted with the track "Jus-Dis" on the compilation album Hard as Hell (Music of Life, 1987) - an album which also included Overlord X's first track before he was later signed by Mango Records: in later years, Duke and X would develop a grudge that led to both producing music belittling each other. In 1988, Duke was support to Salt-N-Pepa on their UK tour.

A series of singles followed, with Duke finally pairing with longtime partner DJ Leader One on the single "Throw Your Hands in the Air" (Music of Life, 1989) and adding his name to the sleeve with Duke right up to their reincarnation as IC3 for the EPs Excalibur (Shut Up and Dance, 1992).

Duke and Leader One's first album, Organised Rhyme (Music of Life, 1989), was heavily featured on Music of Life's 1989 Hustlers Convention album. It contained their most famous single, "I'm Riffin' (English Rasta)" (Music of Life, 1989). The single was popular amongst hip hop fans, and received airplay and often crops up on compilation albums.

More singles followed, as well as the follow-up album Return of the Dread-I (Music of Life, 1991), but Duke parted company with Music of Life. Following this, he guested on other artists' tracks, such as Phat Skillz' "Dress Like Your Enemy"/"Phat Skillz" (Effect, 1992), before moving to the Shut Up and Dance record label for the IC3 project.

In the 1990s, he linked up with the Suburban Base record label to put out breakbeat and jungle tracks on his own record label Hard Disk.

An album for Shut Up and Dance never materialised, but Duke continued to guest on other artist's tunes, such as Lisa Pin-Up, DJ Elvira & DJ Modelle's "Another Jam" (Rock Hard Recordings, 2000). Following this, Duke disappeared from the limelight, although his track "I'm Riffin' (English Rasta)" was sampled for C90's dance hit "Miracle Maker (I'm Riffin)" (Twenty-Three Seven Recordings, 2001).

In 2007, he also appeared in UK hip hop artist Charlie Sloth's song, "Can't Forget About UK". The song was a tribute to pioneering rappers from the UK.

Duke usually appeared at live events and in videos with his backing dancers Billy Boy and Seeker. Both featured on the front cover of the Organised Rhyme album.

Duke died on 21 April 2024. He was 58 years old.

== Discography ==
- Organised Rhyme (Music of Life, 1989)
- Return of the Dread-I (Music of Life, 1991)
- Excalibur EP (with IC3 and Leader One) (Shut Up And Dance, 1992)
- Dubplate Business (as EKUDCM) (Hard Disk, 1993)

=== Live album ===
- Hustlers Convention (with other hip-hop artists) (1989)
