= Do You Right =

Promotional single by 311

from the album Music
- B-side: "Do You Right (Album)"
- Released: 1993
- Studio: Ocean (Burbank, California)
- Length: 4:17
- Label: Capricorn
- Songwriters: Nick Hexum; SA Martinez; Chad Sexton
- Producer: Eddy Offord

311 singles chronology
| "Freak Out" (1992) | "Do You Right" (1993) | "Visit" (1993) |

Music video
- "Do You Right" on YouTube

"Do You Right" is a song by American rock band 311. It was released as a promotional single from the band's debut studio album, Music, which was released on February 9, 1993. It was their first single to chart.

== Charts ==
| Chart (1993) | Peak position |
|---|---|
| US Modern Rock Tracks (Billboard) | 27 |
