= Demon Boyz =

British hip hop group

The Demon Boyz was an English hip hop group formed in London by Demon D, Mike J, and DJ Devastate. They began rapping in their early teens, performing with Twilight Soul Sound. They won a competition on a Dave Pearce rap show, which brought them fame, and their prize was to perform live onstage with Derek B, Faze One, and T La Rock at a Camden Palace gig. Derek B (also known as Derek Boland) was the A&R man for Music of Life. He put them in touch with the company’s founder, Simon Harris.

== History ==
The group assisted the label, The Twilight Firm, in recording the song "This Is a Jam" for the inaugural release of the label's classic series, Hard as Hell (Music of Life, 1987). The group was quickly signed based on the song's reception. The Demon Boyz rapped in their "natural accents" instead of rapping in the more traditional American accent, and they influenced the British hip hop scene.

Three singles and their debut album Recognition, produced by The Twilight Firm (Music of Life, 1989) followed, and the band was heavily featured on Music of Life's album Hustlers Convention, which claimed to be the world's first-ever live rap album. The success of that album brought the group to the attention of Island Records’ subsidiary, Mango Records. The group moved to the new label, along with The Twilight Firm, and released the single "International Karate" (Mango Records, 1990) to high acclaim. However, Island closed their subsidiary soon afterwards and the group found they had no record deal.

They joined the Tribal Bass label in 1991, and were also joined by a new DJ, DJ Def K. The new label was run by their friend Rebel MC. The group released two more singles, "Dett" and "Glimity Glamity". "Dett" featured two mixes: Feeder Mix (produced by DJ Pogo) and Jungle Mix (produced by Rebel MC). "Glimity Glamity" was a collaboration of Mike J, DJ Def K, and Cutmaster Swift. This single remained number one in the hip hop charts for more than four weeks. Their second album, Original Guidance (The Second Chapter) (Tribal Bass, 1992), soon followed. The album was well received within the scene, but shortly afterward the group disbanded.

Mike J guested on the single "High Grade" (Knowledge and Wisdom Records, 2001) by Knowledge and Wisdom. He then collaborated with the Freestylers on the singles "No Replica" (Against the Grain, 2003), "Boom Blast", and "Dogz and Sledgez"; all of which appear on the album Raw as F**k. Mike continued to record an album entitled Spektrum, which was released in May 2008 under the name Million Dan on his own label Million Dappa Records. Demon Boyz and Million Dan both have songs featured on the Herbalizer's 2006 Fabriclive 26 mix CD, with "Glimmity Glammity" and "Dogz n Sledgez" respectively.

== Discography ==
Demon Boyz

- Recognition (Music of Life, 1989)
- Original Guidance (The Second Chapter) (Tribal Bass, 1992)

=== Compilation appearances ===
- Hustlers Convention (1989)

Million Dan

- Spektrum (2008)

== Bibliography ==
- Hoffmann, Frank (May 22, 2005). Rhythm and Blues, Rap, and Hip-hop. Infobase Publishing. ISBN 9780816069804 – via Google Books.
