= Asher D and Daddy Freddy =

Music duo

Asher D and Daddy Freddy were an English/Jamaican duo that recorded for the Music of Life label (licensed to Profile Records in the US) in the late 1980s, releasing an album—Ragamuffin Hip-Hop—considered groundbreaking for its fusion of dancehall and hip-hop, later known as ragga.

The duo then collaborated on major-label single "We Are the Champions" in 1989, which was later included on Daddy Freddy's 1991 album Stress. Both also recorded as individuals.
