= Stress (Daddy Freddy album) =

Studio album by Daddy Freddy
- Released: 1991
- Genre: Raggamuffin
- Label: Chrysalis
- Producer: Simon Harris

Daddy Freddy chronology
Cater Fe She	Stress	Raggamuffin Soldier

Stress is an album by the Jamaican musician Daddy Freddy, released in 1991. It made Billboard's Top R&B Albums chart. Daddy Freddy incorporated samples from rock bands like the Rolling Stones and Led Zeppelin. "Nuff Respect" is a version of the Otis Redding song. "Ragga House (All Night Long)" samples Stephen Bishop's "On and On".

== Critical reception ==
Professional ratings
Review scores
Source	Rating
AllMusic	3/5 stars
Calgary Herald	C

The Baltimore Sun called the album "derivative, but fun," writing that "unlike a lot of 'ragamuffin' rap, Daddy Freddy's work tends to play down the reggae-based style's impenetrable patois and sing-song cadences." The Calgary Herald noted that "Freddy is a ragamuffin powerhouse early on, blending the street-wise sounds of urban America with the woeful angst of the Kingston slums." The Dayton Daily News wrote that "there's a grittiness on Stress, not unlike that found on hard-core urban American raps."

== Track listings ==
=== CD ===
1. "Intro" - 0:13
2. "Go Freddy Go" - 5:06
3. "Talking Beatbox" - 5:07
4. "Born Christian" - 4:02
5. "Haul & Paul Badboy" - 0:19
6. "Daddy Freddy's in Town" - 5:07
7. "Ragga House (All Night Long)" - 4:57
8. "Article Don" - 4:23
9. "Up to Full Speed" - 0:20
10. "Nuff Respect" - 4:52
11. "Rockin' with the Best" (featuring Dale Joyner) - 6:17
12. "Roughneck Nuh Ramp" (featuring Tenor Fly) - 4:25
13. "The Crown" - 5:10
14. "Go Freddy Go" (Simon Harris remix) (featuring Tenor Fly) - 5:09
15. "We Are the Champions" (featuring Asher D) - 5:29

=== 12" vinyl ===
Side A

1. "Intro" - 0:14
2. "Go Freddy Go" (featuring Tenor Fly) - 5:06
3. "Talking Beatbox" - 5:07
4. "Born Christian" - 4:02
5. "Haul and Paul Badboy" - 0:19
6. "Daddy Freddy's in Town" - 5:07
7. "Ragga House (All Night Long)" (featuring Simon Harris) - 4:57
8. "Article Don" - 4:23

Side B

1. "Up to Full Speed" - 0:20
2. "Nuff Respect" - 5:01
3. "Rockin' with the Best" (featuring Dale Joyner) - 6:17
4. "Roughneck Nuh Ramp" (featuring Tenor Fly) - 4:25
5. "The Crown" - 5:10
6. "Go Freddy Go" (remix) (featuring Tenor Fly) - 5:00
7. "We Are the Champions" (featuring Asher D) - 5:44
