= Bullet from a Gun (album) =

Studio album by Derek B
- Released: 1988
- Genre: Hip hop
- Length: 59:46
- Label: Tuff City
- Producer: Derek B; Simon Harris

Singles from Bullet from a Gun
- 1. "Rock the Beat" Released: 1987; 2. "Get Down" Released: 1987; 3. "Good Groove" Released: 1988; 4. "Bad Young Brother" Released: 1988; 5. "We've Got the Juice" Released: 1988

Professional ratings
Review scores
| Source | Rating |
|---|---|
| AllMusic | 3/5 stars |

Bullet from a Gun is the only album by British rapper and producer Derek B, released in 1988 on Tuff City Records. It reached number nine on the UK Albums Chart. American rap mogul Russell Simmons signed Derek to Rush Artist Management and the album was re-released on Profile Records later in the year. Thanks to the tie-up with Simmons, Derek B toured the world with Public Enemy and Run-DMC that year to promote the album.

The album was one of the first successful hip hop albums by a British artist, and has been cited as an influence by later stars of British urban music. Former BBC Radio 1 DJ Zane Lowe has said Bullet from a Gun "was a massive album for me" and London rapper Ty recalls "he was absolutely groundbreaking. He definitely broke the door down."

== Track listing ==
All songs written by Derek Boland, except where noted.

UK and Europe track listing

1. "Bullet from a Gun" – 5:41
2. "Bad Young Brother" – 3:58
3. "Power Move" – 4:05
4. "Human Time Bomb" – 5:21
5. "All City" (Boland, Lintott, Morgans, Woodbridge) – 4:21
6. "Rock the Beat" – 5:30 (bonus track on cassette and CD only)
7. "Get Down" – 5:36
8. "We've Got the Juice" (Boland, Cockfield) – 4:37
9. "Alright Now" (Boland, Scott) – 5:00
10. "Good Groove" (Boland, The Corporation) – 5:52
11. "Success" – 4:49
12. "Derek B's Got...! – 4:01 (bonus track on CD only)
13. "Bad Young Brother" (Billy Beat Mix) – 4:48 (bonus track on CD only)
- Note: the two sides of the vinyl LP and cassette versions of the album were labelled "East End" and "West End", respectively, referring to the East End and West End of London.

US track listing

1. "Bullet from a Gun" – 5:39
2. "Goodgroove" (Boland, The Corporation) – 6:31
3. "Power Move" – 4:05
4. "Bad Young Brother" – 4:04
5. "We Got the Juice" (Boland, Cockfield) – 5:44
6. "Def Beat Boy" – 3:46
7. "All City" (Boland, Lintott, Morgans, Woodbridge) – 4:21
8. "Rock the Beat" – 4:42
9. "Human Time Bomb" – 5:22
10. "Get Down" – 5:40
11. "Success" – 4:50
12. "It's Alright Now" (Boland, Alan Scott) – 5:02

== Production ==
- Producer/vocalist: Derek B
- Producer: Simon Harris
- Producer: "Chief Engineer" Scott
