= At the Beeb (radio series) =

At the Beeb is a short-lived radio programme that aired from March to April 1999. There were four half-hour episodes and it was broadcast on BBC Radio 2. It starred Christien Pritchard as Elaine and Simon Harris as Gareth.

== Notes and references ==
Lavalie, John. At the Beeb. EpGuides. 21 Jul 2005. 29 Jul 2005 <https://web.archive.org/web/20070813234722/http://www.epguides.com/AttheBeeb/%3E.
