= Full Service (band) =

US musical group

- Origin: Austin, Texas, U.S.
- Genres: rock, hard rock, surf rock, alternative rock, progressive metal, reggae rock
- Years active: 2004–present
- Members: Tim "Bonesaw" Kepner; Dave "Hoag" Kepner; Elliott "Smellman" Larden
- Past members: Sean "Sunny" Eckel; Anthony "Twinky-P" Pitt; Sam "Tighty" Marshall
- Website: www.fullservicemusic.com

Full Service is an American, Austin, Texas-based band. They are currently a quartet consisting of Tim "Bonesaw" Kepner (vocals, guitar), Dave "Hoag" Kepner (vocals, drums), Elliott "Smellman" Larden (vocals, percussion, keys), and Matt "Weber Effess" Weber (vocals, bass). They have had four bassists counting the newest member of their band Matt "Weber Effess" Weber, the previous one being Sean "Sunny" Eckel, who left the band in August 2015 after about four years in order to pursue other interests. Influences include The Beach Boys, 311, Guns N' Roses, Mastodon, and more. Known for their “takeover” tours and grassroots-or-die ethos, the band inspires strong loyalty from its so-called “fansaws.”

== Takeover Tour ==
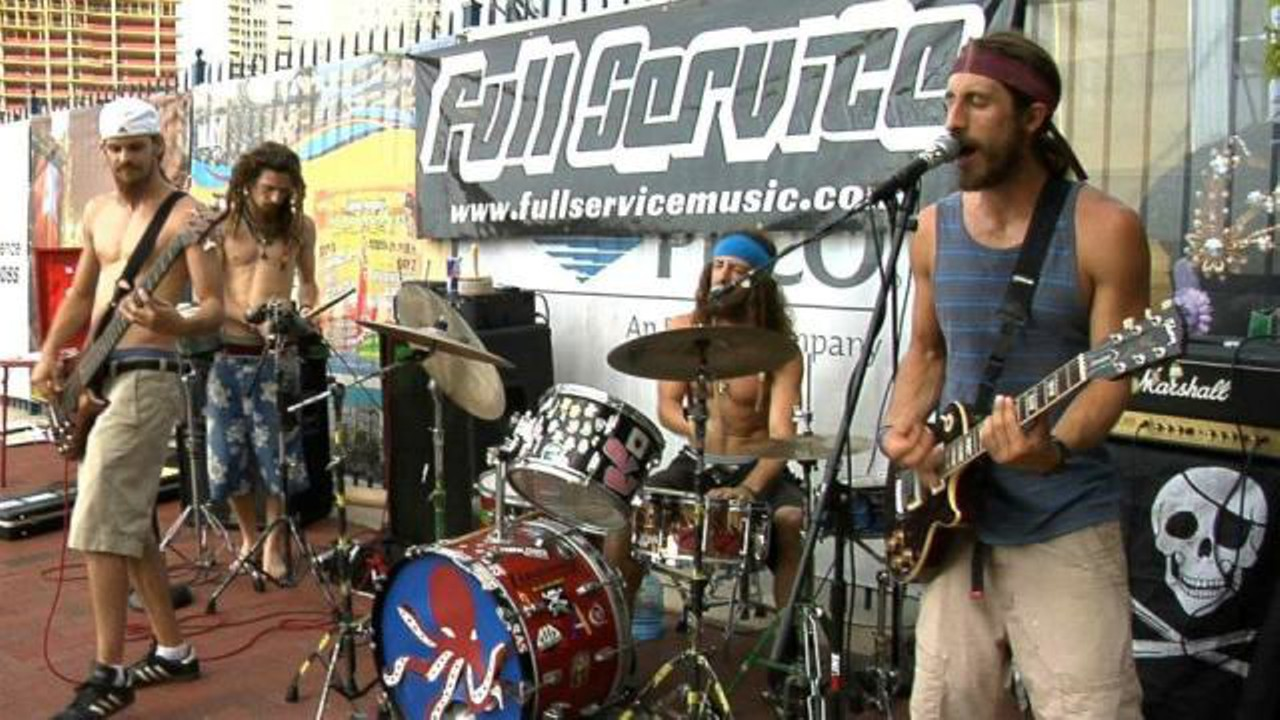
Playing on a sidewalk during a "takeover"

In the summer of 2008, Full Service embarked on a "takeover" tour in which they played in the parking lots of the venues during a summer tour featuring 311 and Snoop Dogg. As they were not invited on the tour, these shows occasionally resulted in confrontations with local authorities. After one of these incidents in Houston, they played from inside their van (known as "The Whale") while passing the venue entrance.

The takeover effort ended up successful in that Full Service was allowed to play inside The Backyard in Austin at the end of 311's tour. Later, 311 asked Full Service to open for them at three shows in 2009, including one at the Austin Music Hall.

311 has since invited Full Service to play on their Caribbean Cruises since 2011 along with their 2011 Pow Wow festival at Spirit of the Suwannee Music Park in Florida. The night before 311 Day in New Orleans in March 2014, Full Service played two sets at a club, one of them made up of covers of 311 songs.

Full Service has a deeper history playing takeover shows. In the past, the band has performed generator-powered sets at college campuses or anywhere they could find a space where people could listen to their music.

The band has created a documentary of the 2008 takeover tour, which they are trying to find distribution for.

In late June 2013, Bonesaw and Full Service was featured as an interview guest of Steve Rennie's "Renman Live!" show, starting about 53:00 in. The Takeover Tour was highlighted, along with the documentary being made available for viewers to watch.

== 20 Tour ==
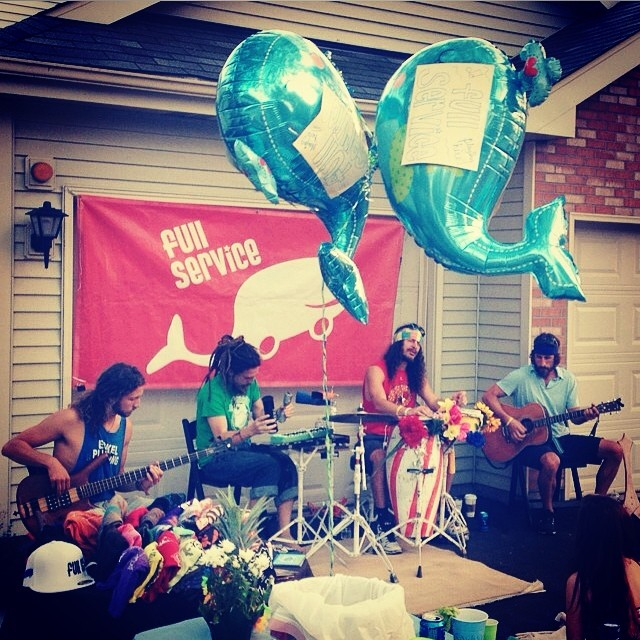
Example of a 20 Tour show at a fan's home

To promote their second acoustic album (Roaming Dragons), Full Service went on a "20 Tour" during 2011. These shows have consisted of fans contacting the band to let them know they would like to host a set for approximately 20 people, and the band will come out and play at a location of the fan's choosing.

This is often at the fan's own home but has included the beach, a private room above a bar, and even an Air Force base. Typically, the band will select a region of the country and perform a dozen or so shows, with hosts collecting $20 on average from each person to help cover the travel costs. Fans are also encouraged to bring food for a potluck-style meal.

On April 14, 2011, Full Service kicked off the "20 Tour" at Casa de Stroud, a nickname for Steffan Stroud's home, in which 20 crowd members performed the band's first homemade crowd surf. This was in conjunction with Full Service's finale. The next year, on April 6, 2012, the band returned and rechristened it "Casa de Kazoo" in a song written specially for that show. The name is a reference to host Steffan's Fansaw nickname, "The Kazoologist," for the many times he has played with the band during live performances of Trumpets.

Full Service continues to perform "20 Tour" shows as a staple of their traveling schedule, with their most recent one taking them to the Pacific Northwest for the second time.

Fans that host two of more shows have been inducted into the Full Service Fansaw Hall of Fame, a distinguished honor among the Fansaws.

== Full Service Circus ==
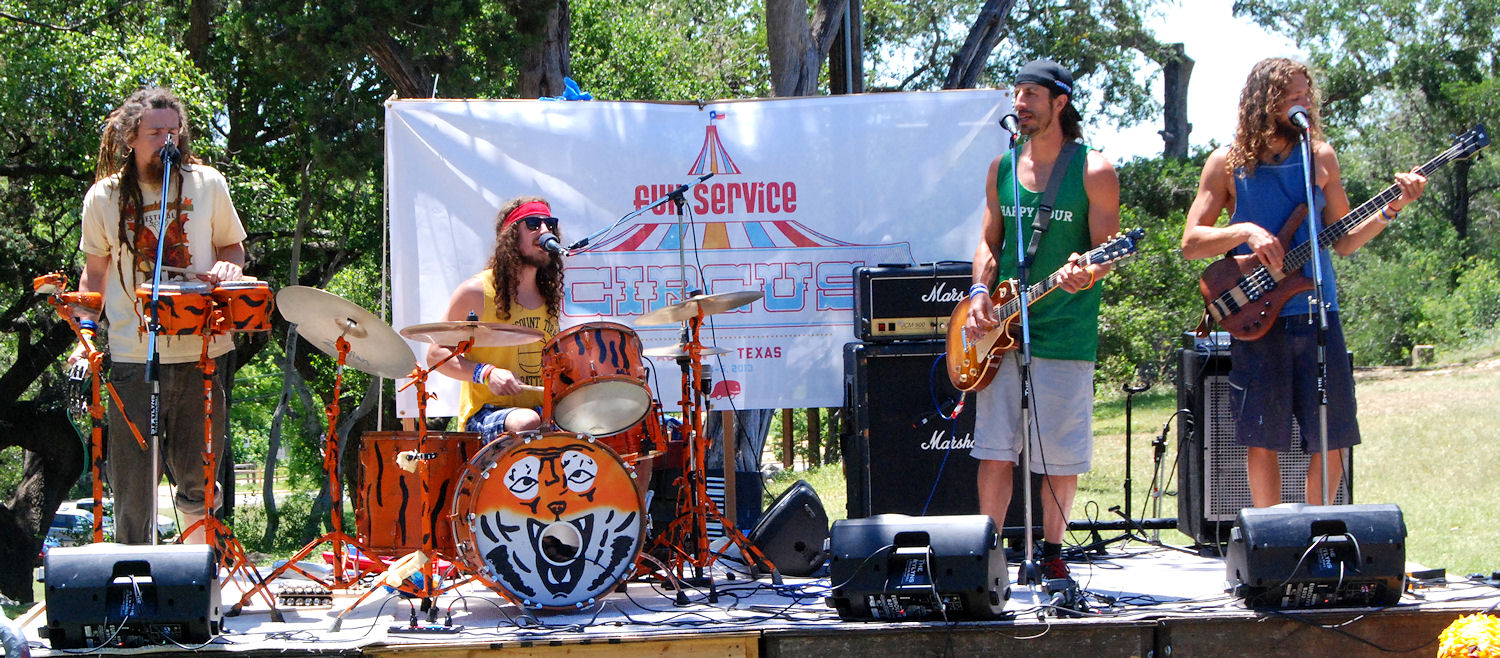
Performing at the Full Service Circus in 2013

On December 5, 2012, Full Service announced that they would be hosting a festival in Austin, Texas, in May 2013. The Full Service Circus would be akin to a "reverse 20 tour"; instead of the fans hosting the band, this time the band would host the fans in their hometown and, literally, their own backyard. The Circus would not feature animals ("just the band members") but instead showcase the sights and sounds of Austin, visiting such places as FSHQ (the band's home and headquarters), Antone's, and Zilker Park. Sponsors, including Austin's Pizza and Wahoo's Fish Taco, would host events and offer discounted food and drinks throughout the event ($1 pizza slices, tacos and local draft beers).

On December 17, 2012, the band hosted a "muppet-style" telethon online where they performed songs and skits, spoke with callers and answered questions viewers had about the Circus. During the nearly three-hour event, the band sold the first 100 of the approximately 230 tickets that would ultimately be purchased.

For the Circus itself, May 3–5, 2013, fans arrived from all parts of the United States and enjoyed three days full of events.

- Friday included sports at Zilker Park (volleyball, frisbee, etc.) then a gathering at FSHQ. People played carnival-style games (basketball, balloon darts, wheel of fortune, etc.) for chances to win merchandise. Gift bags containing information were handed out, and announcements were made. Full Service also designed a self-guided museum style tour of their home and yard, putting up 86 "points of interest" people could read about. For the public show at Antone's, Sip Sip performed as the opening band and local friend and comedian Ramin Nazer did stand-up before Full Service played to 350+ people, many dressed in "circus freak" costumes along with the band members themselves.
- Saturday morning featured yoga with Bonesaw near the Barton Springs Pool, plus disc golf with Sunny and Smell at Zilker Park. In the afternoon, an acoustic show was performed at FSHQ for about half the fans while others had free time to check out local events such as the Pecan St. Festival or shop along South Congress. People met at Wahoo's Fish Taco downtown for a party before the evening show back at FSHQ for the rest of the fans. Following the show, some enjoyed an after-party at the Javelina Bar on Rainey St.
- Sunday was highlighted by a midday show near the Moon Tower at Zilker Park, with Shinyribs opening. Notably, fans staged an impromptu takeover of their own in the middle of the song "Youuuuu," gathering in front of the stage for a large group photo while the band played. Afterward, many fans went for a swim at the Barton Springs Pool to close out the weekend.

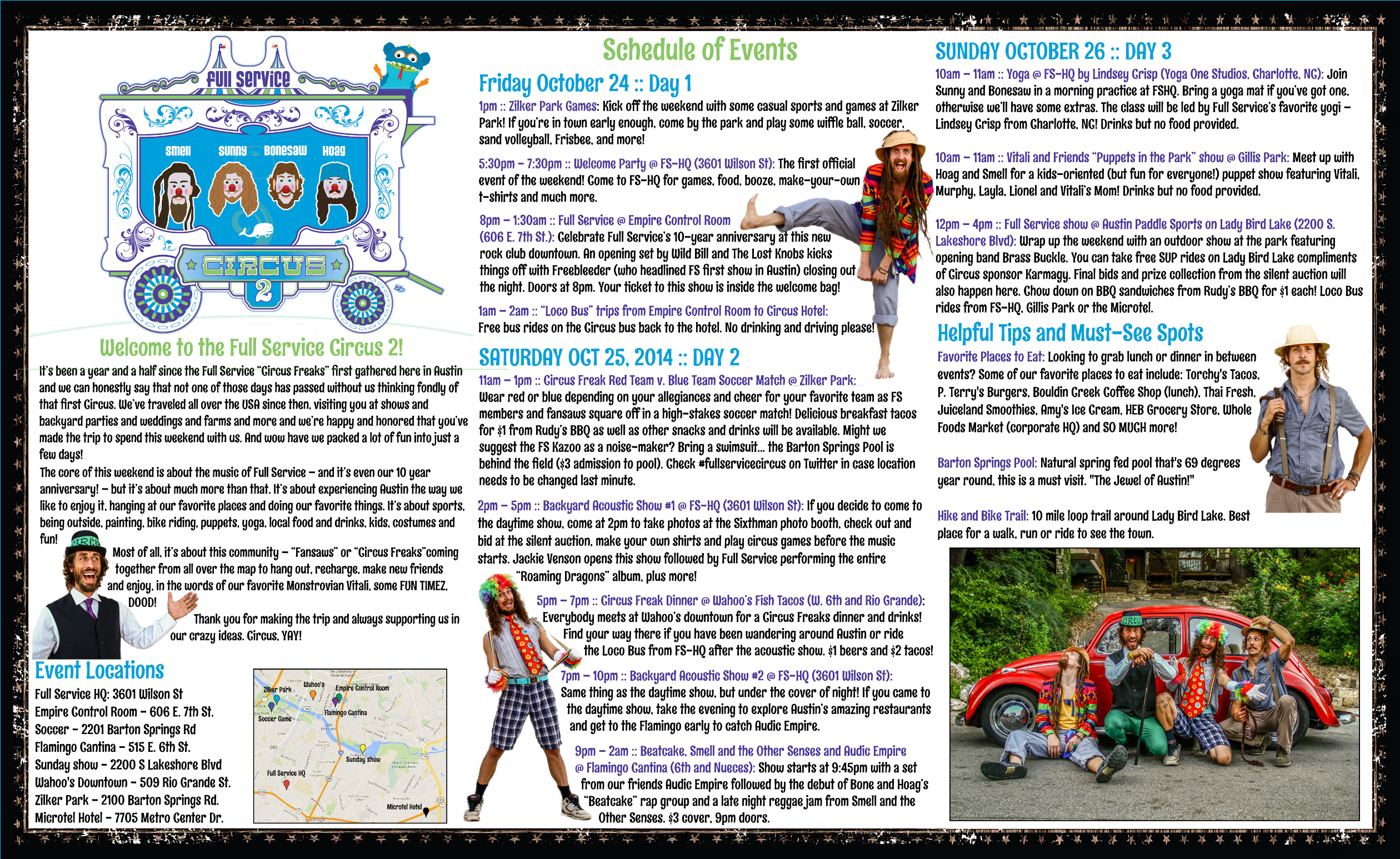
Full Service Circus 2 program

Based on the overall success of the first Full Service Circus, the band hoped to make this an annual event. Full Service Circus 2 was held October 24–26, 2014, with a similar format as the first. Highlights included a silent auction of various band-related items (proceeds going toward tour van maintenance, etc.), a show at Empire Control Room, a "Red Team vs. Blue Team" soccer match consisting of the band members along with attendees interested in playing, two backyard acoustic shows in which the album "Roaming Dragons" was played in its entirety, and a show at The Buzz Mill with a puppet show prior to it (relocated due to city maintenance work). A school bus was also rented and decorated as the "Locobus" to transport people to and from various places. The graphic is from an information packet each attendee received.

Following Full Service Circus 2, Steve Rennie drew attention to it on his website, calling Full Service "the poster boys of F*ck the Gatekeepers," a mentality he describes as "the idea of overcoming obstacles on the way to doing something great."

The third Full Service Circus took place in Oct 2016, which included several shows and the annual Red vs Blue soccer match with the Red team in a close victory.

The fourth and final Full Service Circus was planned for Oct 26-28. This will showcase all original members of the band in a reunion with four shows total.

== Promotion and marketing ==
As an unsigned, unrepresented band, most of Full Service's attention comes from fan word-of-mouth along with their online presence. Full Service makes frequent use of YouTube to create skits, post general band updates, and make the occasional instructional video to show people how to play a song. In addition, they often stream jams and practices online along with seeking fan input when it comes to ideas and suggestions, which helps strengthen the connections made. They are active on Facebook and Twitter as well.

To promote Carousel, released Oct. 1, 2013, Full Service held a 3-hour webcast with skits and live performances on Sep. 26, 2013. This was done from their home in Austin as they offered for sale 200 packages that included a digital copy of the album, two CDs with the intent purchasers would give one to a friend as a way of introducing them to the band, an autographed lyric sheet, and a promise to send a tree sapling to be planted at a location of the buyer's choosing. This method was described by the band as one of trying to connect music to people in a different manner.

Another webcast was held on October 27, 2015, to promote the new album Lockers. This time 250 packages were made available, including a digital download as a pre-release, with physical CDs expected to be sent in November along with a t-shirt, sticker, and signed lyric sheet. The concept of one CD for the buyer plus one to give to a friend is being repeated.

== Discography ==
2004: 3 Will Ride Forth
- Released Nov. 8, 2004
- 13 songs, 46 minutes
- 1. "40% Chance" - 1:56
- 2. "Bonesaw" - 3:32
- 3. "Bebop" - 2:10
- 4. "Late January" - 3:04
- 5. "Single Note Slayer" - 2:48
- 6. "This Is A Tale" - 0:46
- 7. "Rise The Sun" - 4:08
- 8. "'boons With 'boards" - 3:49
- 9. "Battleship" - 4:39
- 10. "Feelings Stirred" - 4:39
- 11. "Have You Been Listening?" - 4:42
- 12. "Blocks Fall" - 4:56
- 13. "Rasful Heights" - 4:38
2005: Irie Love (acoustic)
- Released Jun. 8, 2005
- 15 songs, 61 minutes
- 1. "Get Me Out Of Here" - 2:49
- 2. "Olivia" - 2:05
- 3. "Hooked In" - 3:29
- 4. "Ghost Of Gettysburg" - 5:07
- 5. "Bad News" - 4:14
- 6. "Irie Love" - 3:57
- 7. "Beautiful Taste" - 4:03
- 8. "Lizards On The Tree" - 4:11
- 9. "Pizza Song" - 3:10
- 10. "Girls" - 4:45
- 11. "For Seasons" - 3:40
- 12. "Love Is Requited" - 3:15
- 13. "Restless" - 4:43
- 14. "Pulse" - 5:28
- 15. "542" - 5:51
2005: Sawngs
- Released Dec. 13, 2005
- 7 songs, 28 minutes
- 1. "Oh Kill Me" - 4:50
- 2. "Bo Ding Is Not A Crime" - 3:16
- 3. "Ate Enough" - 3:36
- 4. "3 Will Ride Forth" - 5:38
- 5. "Water" - 3:28
- 6. "Homies" - 2:59
- 7. "Goonies" - 3:26
2006: Recess
- Released Sep. 14, 2006
- 19 songs, 74 minutes
- 1. "Freezing Dub" - 3:15
- 2. "Your Emo Band" - 3:17
- 3. "Ramona" - 4:24
- 4. "Maybe It's Just You" - 3:48
- 5. "Sully's Wedding" - 2:20
- 6. "Clock Ticks" - 4:16
- 7. "In The Meantime" - 4:25
- 8. "Steel Drum Solo" - 1:55
- 9. "Undertow" - 4:06
- 10. "Alpine" - 3:33
- 11. "In A Rescue" - 4:51
- 12. "Moon Cradle" - 2:58
- 13. "Empty Sea" - 4:47
- 14. "Black Is Back" - 4:27
- 15. "Yanamo" - 4:29
- 16. "Broken Women" - 3:35
- 17. "Legs" - 5:12
- 18. "Aimee In Arizona" - 4:27
- 19. "A New Way" - 3:46
2007: Good Question
- Released Mar. 28, 2007
- 3 songs, 12 minutes
- 1. "Hi Ho" - 3:56
- 2. "Late January" - 3:56
- 3. "Imaginary Girl" - 3:23
2008: The Dig
- Released Jan. 17, 2008
- 11 songs, 39 minutes
- 1. "Hi Ho" - 3:33
- 2. "Tasteless Gravy" - 2:52
- 3. "Blueberry Farm" - 3:44
- 4. "Hotter In The House" - 3:55
- 5. "Subterranean" - 3:10
- 6. "Don't Deny" - 3:14
- 7. "Blasted Lands" - 3:42
- 8. "Egwene" - 4:11
- 9. "Bombs Killed My Father" - 3:32
- 10. "Do It Again" - 2:59
- 11. "Blueglass Lake" - 3:44
2009: Public Service Announcement (live album)
- Released Feb. 3, 2009
- 16 songs, 64 minutes
- "Black Is Back" - 4:43
- 2. "Tasteless Gravy" - 2:59
- 3. "Freezing Dub" - 2:49
- 4. "Hi Ho" - 3:36
- 5. "Don't Deny" - 4:00
- 6. "Clock Ticks" - 4:04
- 7. "Hotter In The House" - 4:21
- 8. "Subterranean" - 3:22
- 9. "Battleship" - 5:27
- 10. "Trumpets" - 3:42
- 11. "Oh Kill Me" - 4:52
- 12. "Blueberry Farm" - 3:56
- 13. "Bombs Killed My Father" - 3:35
- 14. "Tomatoes" - 2:50
- 15. "Ramona" - 4:50
- 16. "Blueglass Lake" - 4:10
2009: The Earth Still Wants You
- Released Mar. 10, 2009
- 17 songs, 62 minutes
- 1. "Rocketships" - 4:57
- 2. "Trumpets" - 3:25
- 3. "Gymnasium" - 3:16
- 4. "Brazil" - 4:04
- 5. "Ride Your Bike" - 4:29
- 6. "Tomatoes" - 2:38
- 7. "Sit At The Table" - 3:57
- 8. "Hoag's Bells (interlude)" - 1:04
- 9. "Multitudes" - 3:56
- 10. "Laundry On The Line" - 5:42
- 11. "Eyes Like Snow" - 4:40
- 12. "Hops" - 3:59
- 13. "Crickets And Spiders" - 4:23
- 14. "Sunsplash (interlude)" - 2:10
- 15. "Everybody" - 4:00
- 16. "Tennessee Traveler" - 2:57
- 17. "It Ain't Easy Bein' Nessie" - 1:14
2010: Live 2010 (live album)
- Released 2010
- 23 songs, 80 minutes
- 1. "Don't Deny" - 3:32
- 2. "Tasteless Gravy" - 3:28
- 3. "Hi Ho" - 3:33
- 4. "Black Is Back - 5:11
- 5. "Gymnasium" - 3:21
- 6. "Greet Your Neighbor" (commentary) - 0:38
- 7. "Rocketships" - 5:19
- 8. "Water" - 3:31
- 9. "Sneak Peek" (song snippet) - 1:25
- 10. "Brazil" - 3:52
- 11. "Battleship" - 4:43
- 12. "Yes I'm A" - 3:41
- 13. "Ramona" - 4:38
- 14. "Greetings From Beyond" - 5:29
- 15. "It Ain't Easy Bein' Nessie" - 1:05
- 16. "Crowd Surfing" (commentary) - 0:37
- 17. "Trumpets" - 3:30
- 18. "'boons With 'Boards" - 4:24
- 19. "Bonesaw" - 3:32
- 20. "Late January" - 4:24
- 21. "In The Meantime" - 4:27
- 22. "Tennessee Traveler" - 3:33
- 23. "You Are My Sunshine" - 1:08
2010: Roaming Dragons (acoustic)
- Released Nov. 27, 2010
- 18 songs, 56 minutes
- 1. "Lately" - 4:44
- 2. "Temporarily" - 2:49
- 3. "Kristine" - 3:37
- 4. "Hallways" - 4:40
- 5. "Greetings" - 3:39
- 6. "Roaming Dragons" - 4:21
- 7. "Minnows" - 3:16
- 8. "The Dub Stops Here" - 1:19
- 9. "Island On An Island" - 1:47
- 10. "No One Can Find Me" - 2:36
- 11. "Headstone" - 4:14
- 12. "Strings" - 3:17
- 13. "Send No More Letters" - 2:47
- 14. "Light On" - 1:55
- 15. "Chickens" - 2:27
- 16. "The Owl Owns The Tree" - 1:50
- 17. "Ordinary Unknown Crime" - 4:29
- 18. "Loris" - 1:48
2012: Coconuts And Other B-Sides
- Released Jan. 2, 2012
- 6 songs, 23 minutes
- 1. "Coconuts" - 4:01
- 2. "Yes I'm A" - 3:32
- 3. "The Pieta" - 3:23
- 4. "Already Had A Heart" - 4:42
- 5. "Breakdancer" - 3:27
- 6. "Flavors (Hoag's Mix)" - 3:48
2012: I Wanna Go Home (single)
- Released Mar. 27, 2012
- 2 songs, 8 minutes
- "I Wanna Go Home" - 3:36
- 2. "Ice Cream Cone" - 3:29
2013: Home Is Where The Yard Is
- Released Feb. 1, 2013
- 19 songs, 72 minutes
- (Note: Songs 1-9 were released as 3-track EPs, then collected as a full album with song 10 and the bonus demos. The EP versions are no longer available separately.)
- 1. "Revisited" - 5:12
- 2. "Apples" - 3:29
- 3. "Like A Pony" - 4:36
- 4. "Better Back Then" - 4:24
- 5. "Greetings From Beyond" - 4:41
- 6. "Row Your Boat" - 3:33
- 7. "Youuuuu" - 4:21
- 8. "Shove" 3:41
- 9. "Dreamwork" - 4:13
- 10. "Dumb Angel" - 4:35
- 11. "Apples (Demo Session Remix)" - 3:30
- 12. "Revisited (Demo Session Remix)" - 4:26
- 13. "Like A Pony (Demo Session Remix)" - 4:32
- 14. "Better Back Then (Demo Session Remix)" - 3:30
- 15. "Shove (Demo Session Remix)" - 3:15
- 16. "Row Your Boat (Demo Session Remix)" - 0:58
- 17. "Greetings (Demo Session Remix)" - 0:57
- 18. "Dreamwork (Demo Session Remix)" - 2:52
- 19. "Youuuuu (Demo Session Remix)" - 4:38
2013: Live from the Full Service Circus (live album)
- Released Jul. 1, 2013
- 29 songs, 125 minutes
- (Note: Available from the band's own website. This is from a show at Antone's in Austin, TX, May 3, 2013.)
- 1. "Intro to the Circus" - 2:05
- 2. "Rocketships" - 5:20
- 3. "Better Back Then" - 6:15
- 4. "Lately" - 4:28
- 5. "Ramona" - 4:40
- 6. "Circus Freak w/ Drum Solo" - 8:53
- 7. "Sunsplash (Instrumental)" - 1:35
- 8. "Coconuts" - 4:04
- 9. "Tennessee Traveler" - 4:57
- 10. "Ate Enough" - 3:45
- 11. "Meet the ParentSaws (Interlude)" - 2:07
- 12. "She Loves You (featuring ParentSaws)" - 2:48
- 13. "Revisited" - 5:02
- 14. "Vitali Makes an Appearance (Interlude)" - 1:22
- 15. "Hi Ho" - 3:46
- 16. "Oddball Memories (named Mike Jackson at the time)" - 7:10
- 17. "Bonesaw" - 3:58
- 18. "I Wanna Go Home" - 4:21
- 19. "Black Is Back" - 6:28
- 20. "Flower Boxes" - 3:45
- 21. "Ride Your Bike" - 4:17
- 22. "Tasteless Gravy" - 3:57
- 23. "Eyes Like Snow" - 4:41
- 24. "Apples" - 4:03
- 25. "Kevin vs. The Kazooologist (Interlude)" - 1:33
- 26. "Trumpets" - 5:01
- 27. "Hops" - 4:00
- 28. "Blasted Lands" - 4:00
- 29. "Battleship" - 6:01
2013: Carousel
- Released Oct. 1, 2013
- 12 songs, 53 minutes
- 1. "Honeybee" - 5:33
- 2. "Evergreen" - 4:32
- 3. "Circus Freak" - 4:07
- 4. "Two Old Birds" - 5:16
- 5. "Ba Da Ba" - 3:26
- 6. "30th Anniversary" - 3:49
- 7. "Sawdust" - 4:17
- 8. "Oddball Memories" - 5:42
- 9. "Flower Boxes" - 3:27
- 10. "Me and the Moon" - 4:34
- 11. "Swimming Mood" - 4:37
- 12. "Huge Gray Blue" - 3:35
2015: Lockers
- Released Oct. 28, 2015
- 14 songs, 65 minutes
- 1. "Mushed 'em" - 4:12
- 2. "Tim Roberts" - 4:26
- 3. "Mikey Mussel" - 4:43
- 4. "Lockers" - 4:00
- 5. "That's My Jam" - 5:13
- 6. "She has the Capacity to Geek" - 5:40
- 7. "Phil Collins" - 4:48
- 8. "Slow Drops" - 4:27
- 9. "She Geeks" - 4:32
- 10. "Sea Otter" - 3:42
- 11. "Vukota" - 4:23
- 12. "Earl Thomas" - 4:43
- 13. "I, Duke of Finsburg" - 5:13
- 14. "Corn on the Cob" - 4:38
