= 311 (band) =

American rock band

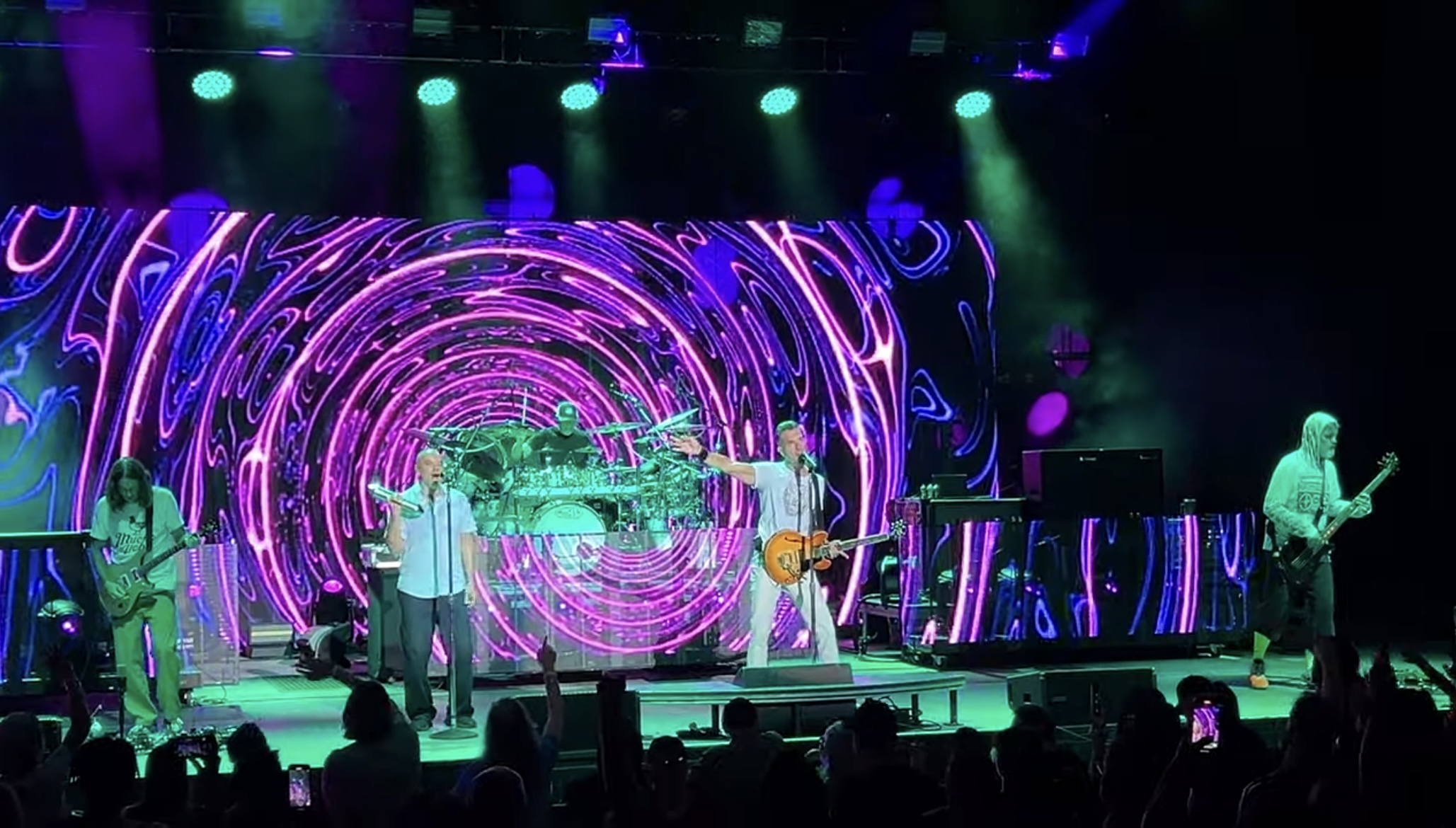
- 311 performing live in July 2024. From left to right: Tim Mahoney, SA Martinez, Chad Sexton, Nick Hexum, P-Nut

Background information
- Origin: Omaha, Nebraska, U.S.
- Genres: Alternative rock; rap rock; reggae rock; funk rock; funk metal
- Years active: 1988–present
- Labels: 311; ATO; Volcano; Capricorn; MapleMusic; BMG; Cleopatra
- Members: Nick Hexum; Aaron "P-Nut" Wills; Chad Sexton; Tim Mahoney; Doug "SA" Martinez
- Past members: Jim Watson
- Website: www.311.com

311 (pronounced "three eleven") is an American rock band from Omaha, Nebraska. The band was formed in 1988 by vocalist and guitarist Nick Hexum, lead guitarist Jim Watson, bassist Aaron "P-Nut" Wills, and drummer Chad Sexton. Watson was replaced by Tim Mahoney in 1990. In 1992, Doug "SA" Martinez joined as a second vocalist and turntablist.

311 has released fourteen studio albums, two live albums, four compilation albums, four EPs and four DVDs. After a series of independent releases, 311 was signed to Capricorn Records in 1992 and released the albums Music (1993) and Grassroots (1994) to moderate success. They achieved greater success with their 1995 triple platinum self-titled album, which reached number 12 on the Billboard 200 on the strength of the singles "Down" and "All Mixed Up", the former of which topped the Billboard Hot Modern Rock Tracks in 1996. The band's next three albums—Transistor (1997), Soundsystem (1999), and From Chaos (2001)—were also successful, with the first going platinum and the last two going gold. Their 2004 compilation album Greatest Hits '93–'03 was also certified platinum. The band's latest studio album is 2024's Full Bloom. By 2022, 311 had sold over 10 million records in the United States.

The band's name was chosen by Wills from the police code for indecent exposure in Omaha after Watson was arrested and cited for skinny dipping in a public pool.

== History ==
=== Early recordings (1988–1992) ===
311's first independent release was the Downstairs EP, which was recorded in 1989 in Nick Hexum's basement. Unlike many of their releases, it had no cover art. It features the song "Feels So Good," which was recreated/remastered in the album Music and is a staple of most of 311's live shows.

In 1990, 311 produced 300 cassettes of their second independent release, Dammit!, recorded at IEV Studios in Papillion, Nebraska.

In 1991, Tim Mahoney replaced Jim Watson on guitar and 311 released their third independent release, Unity, recorded at Rainbow Recording Studios in Omaha. 1000 CDs and 500 cassettes of Unity were printed; they were distributed through consignment and sold at shows. The band began to headline shows in local clubs, such as the Ranch Bowl and Sokol Auditorium.

In 1992, Doug "SA" Martinez, whose nickname stands for Spooky Apparition and who had been making various appearances with 311 over the past years as a vocalist, was officially asked to join the band. 311 recorded a six-track demo, called Hydroponic, also recorded at Rainbow Recording Studios, and moved to Los Angeles. Within their first few months, 311 was signed to Capricorn Records.

=== Music and Grassroots (1993–1994) ===
Their first major record, Music, was released in 1993. The single "Do You Right" received airplay on modern rock stations and reached No. 27 on Billboard's Modern Rock Tracks chart. However, the album failed to chart at the time. The album was produced by Eddy Offord, who famously produced Yes and Emerson, Lake & Palmer.

Financing their own tour, the band drove around in an old RV borrowed from Sexton's father and towed a Volkswagen bus which held their equipment. After tackling a steep incline while en route to an Omaha show, the RV caught fire. The only door out of the vehicle was surrounded by flames so the band jumped through the fire. All of their equipment and possessions were lost, though no one was seriously injured. The band continued their tour using borrowed equipment.

The following year, they released their second studio album, Grassroots.

=== Mainstream breakthrough (1995–2001) ===
In 1995, 311 released the self-titled 311 (colloquially known as "The Blue Album"). Produced by Ron St. Germain, the album was recorded live in contrast to their previous two albums in which all instruments were recorded separately. The first single "Don't Stay Home" was a modest success, reaching No. 29 on Billboard's Modern Rock Tracks chart. But the follow-up single "Down", which was released 14 months after the album, received heavy airplay on mainstream radio, and the accompanying music video was on MTV's rotation. The song hit No. 1 on the Modern Rock chart. The band made their network television debut on Late Night with Conan O'Brien on August 23, 1995. The third single, "All Mixed Up", enjoyed almost identical success, reaching No. 4 on the Modern Rock chart. They also appeared on Late Show with David Letterman playing "Down".

In the following years, 311 continued touring and on August 5, 1997, they released Transistor, which debuted at No. 4 on the Billboard 200, their highest position on that chart. The album went platinum.

In 1998, 311 released Live, a live album from a 1997 performance in New Orleans, Louisiana. 311 also released Omaha Sessions, a compilation album from their early independent releases.

In 1999, 311 released their fifth major album, Soundsystem. The song "Come Original" reached No. 6 on Billboard's Modern Rock Tracks chart. The second single, "Flowing", featured American Pie's Eddie Kaye Thomas in the music video.

Since 2000, the band has recorded every album at the Hive, a North Hollywood, California, recording studio they purchased in 1995. The sessions for From Chaos, 311's sixth major record release, were the first to be held there. From Chaos was released in late 2001. Its first single, "You Wouldn't Believe" featured basketball star Shaquille O'Neal in the video.

=== Evolver and Don't Tread on Me (2002–2006) ===
311's seventh major release, Evolver (produced By Ron Saint Germain), came out in 2003. In summer 2003, 311 launched their inaugural Unity Tour. The tour included openers G. Love & Special Sauce, OAR, and Something Corporate.

In 2004, 311's cover of The Cure's "Love Song" became a No. 1 hit on the Modern Rock Tracks chart. It also reached No. 59 on the Billboard Hot 100, their first single to reach that chart. It was featured on the soundtrack for the motion picture 50 First Dates and then a few months later on their own Greatest Hits '93-'03. The compilation featured two new songs: "How Do You Feel?" and "First Straw".

In summer 2004, 311 played a free show at a city park in Omaha for the city's 175th Anniversary Celebration. The band changed all marijuana-related lyrics in the songs they played for the appearance. Later that summer, then the band kicked off their second annual Unity Tour with openers The Roots and Medeski Martin & Wood.

On August 16, 2005, 311 released their eighth studio album, titled Don't Tread on Me. "Don't Tread on Me," the first single, reached No. 2 on the Billboard Modern Rock chart and No. 7 at Bubbling Under Hot 100 Singles.

In mid-2005, 311 kicked off their third annual Unity Tour with openers Papa Roach and Unwritten Law.

On July 20, 2006, 311 kicked off their Summer Unity Tour, playing 37 shows in 27 states and featuring opening bands Pepper and Wailers. After completion of the tour, 311 announced they would be taking a break from recording.

=== Uplifter and Universal Pulse (2007–2011) ===
In January 2007, 311 stepped back into their Hive Studios with Nick's younger brother Zack Hexum. They recorded a cover of Toots & the Maytals song "Reggae Got Soul" for the soundtrack from the film Surf's Up, which was released on June 5, 2007.

Their Summer Unity Tour in 2007 included supporting acts Matisyahu and The English Beat. In 2008, they featured opening acts Snoop Dogg and Fiction Plane.

Uplifter, 311's ninth studio album, was released on June 2, 2009. The album, produced at 311's Hive Recording Studios in Los Angeles by Bob Rock, debuted at No. 3 on the Billboard 200, the band's highest chart position in the U.S. to date. The band followed up the release of the album with tours in Summer and Fall 2009. They have completed their Spring 2010 tour, which included 311 Day 2010, held in Las Vegas, Nevada. A Summer tour with The Offspring began in June 2010. 311 also held a 2010 fall tour.

2009's Summer Unity Tour featured opening acts Ziggy Marley and The Expendables, and 2010's featured supporting act The Offspring and opening act Pepper.

In early 2011, 311 finished recording their tenth studio album called Universal Pulse at the Hive in Los Angeles, with producer Bob Rock. The album was released July 19, 2011. The album's first single, "Sunset in July" was released on June 3, 2011. Universal Pulse is their shortest album yet, only having 8 songs.

In 2011, Sublime With Rome and DJ Soulman & DJ Trichrome were the openers on the Unity Tour.

=== Stereolithic, Archive Compilation and Mosaic (2012–2017) ===
In summer 2012, 311 embarked on their tenth annual Unity Tour with Slightly Stoopid, SOJA, and The Aggrolites.

On August 24, 2012, Doug "SA" Martinez told Phoenix's Up on the Sun that an eleventh 311 studio album was in the works and planned for release in 2013. However, on July 15, 2013, they announced the album would be released on March 11, 2014, to coincide with 311 Day 2014. The album was produced by Scotch Ralston.

On July 2, 2013, 311 started their eleventh annual Unity Tour with Cypress Hill and G. Love & Special Sauce. The tour ended on August 4, 2013.

Stereolithic, the band's first independently released studio album since 1991's Unity, was released on March 11, 2014.

On November 18, 2014, 311 released a live album, 311 with the Unity Orchestra – Live from New Orleans – 311 Day 2014. The album documents part of the 311 Day 2014 concert wherein the band was accompanied onstage by a symphony orchestra for nine songs.

311 Archive, a four-disc compilation album featuring 81 previously unreleased songs, B-sides, and demos, was released on June 30, 2015.

As of February 2016, according to Nick Hexum, 311 was working on a new album, and in February 2017, the band revealed the new album's title, Mosaic, on their PledgeMusic update feed. Six song titles were released to the public, "Hey Yo", "Island Sun", "Extension", "Too Much to Think", "Syntax Error", and "Too Late"; the first two were debuted at 311 Day 2016. 311 invited their fan base to submit a photo of themselves to be featured on the album artwork. Mosaic was released on June 23, 2017, and was met with positive reviews. It was their 12th studio album and their 10th consecutive to debut in the Top 10 of US Billboard 200. It debuted at number six, with 39,000 album-equivalent units, of which 37,000 were pure album sales.

On March 9, 2017, the band released "Too Much to Think", the first single from Mosaic. Following that, 311 released the singles "Too Late" and "Perfect Mistake"

=== Voyager and Full Bloom (2018–present) ===
In 2018, 311 and the Offspring toured together on the Never-Ending Summer tour. That summer, the Offspring released a cover of 311's "Down" and 311 released a "reggaefied" cover of the Offspring's "Self Esteem". Hexum states that 311 had "the bulk of an album written" and is working with producer/co-writer John Feldmann of Goldfinger on some tracks. Later that summer, Mahoney confirmed that they were working with both Scotch Ralston and John Feldmann on Voyager. Voyager was released on July 12, 2019. The documentary Enlarged to Show Detail 3 was released to theaters for one day only on March 11, 2019.

On March 11, 2020, PRS Guitars asked the band if they were planning to make a new live album or follow-up to Voyager. Guitarist Tim Mahoney said, "This year is all about playing live and celebrating 30 years. Although we do have a few blocks of time set aside for new music writing and recording, the soonest for any new release would be 2021." As part of their 30th anniversary tour, the band was scheduled to co-headline a North American trek with Incubus in the summer of 2020, but it was cancelled because of the COVID-19 pandemic.

On May 16, 2022, P-Nut announced via Twitter that he would be taking a hiatus from the band after they had finished their upcoming tour schedule. On November 30, 2022, P-Nut followed up with an announcement also via Twitter that he would not be taking a hiatus, after having had discussions with the band and having seen support from his family and fans.

On June 7, 2024, 311 premiered the music video for "You're Gonna Get It", their first new single since 2019. The music video, directed by Brian Bowen Smith, sees Hexum as a bare-knuckle pugilist fighting in an underground arena, reminiscent of the 1999 David Fincher film, Fight Club. Hexum said of the track: "The story behind the lyrics to 'You're Gonna Get It' is going back into the mindset of when we were young, and dumb and doing a lot of crazy stuff. Sometimes getting away with it, sometimes with consequences. And I'm going in and out of the first person saying to myself, 'get your stuff together! Or else you're gonna get it.'"

On September 18, 2024, 311 announced the release of their 14th studio album, Full Bloom, along with its second single, "Need Somebody". The album was released on October 25, 2024. The band took to Instagram, describing the album as "311 on steroids."

== 311 Day ==
On March 11, 2000, 311 began celebrating an unofficial holiday of their own creation called 311 Day. The band chose the date because March 11 is written in the United States as 3/11. Every other year on March 11 between 2000 and 2020, and every year since 2021, the band performs an extended concert for thousands of their fans.

In recent years, 311 Day has been split across two or three days. The 2021 event was held as a livestream, due to COVID-19-related restrictions in effect at the time, and consisted only of the band performing the Transistor album in full, while the 2023 event was their first to take place aboard a cruise.

311 Day Events
Date	Location	Venue	Songs Played	Show Notes
March 11, 2000	New Orleans	State Palace Theatre	47	
March 11, 2002	New Orleans	UNO Lakefront Arena	59	
March 11, 2004	New Orleans	UNO Lakefront Arena	68	The band played entire albums, rarities, and covers. Later that year, a DVD was released of the performance that contained 64 of the 68 songs.
March 11, 2006	Memphis	Mid-South Coliseum	65	The intended set list was cut short from 69 songs because of a strict midnight curfew. The band recorded the entire show in high definition, and a 2-hour edit of the show aired on HDTV on December 10.
March 11, 2008	New Orleans	New Orleans Arena	63	Sold-out crowd of 14,000 fans, who represented all 50 states and 13 countries.
March 11, 2010	Las Vegas	Mandalay Bay Events Center	60	All 60 songs, 32 of which were different from 311 Day in 2008, were broadcast live on the web in a video on demand format described as a "professional multi-camera HD production."
March 10/11, 2012	Las Vegas	MGM Grand Garden Arena	Night 1: 39 Night 2: 40	For the first time, was split into two days.
March 11, 2014	New Orleans	New Orleans Arena	66	On July 3, 2013, the band announced at the Unity Tour show in Chicago that 311 Day 2014 would be returning to New Orleans.
March 11/12, 2016	New Orleans	Smoothie King Center	Night 1: 42 Night 2: 42	
March 10/11, 2018	Las Vegas	Park Theater	Night 1: 42 Night 2: 44	86 total songs were played, including a cover of Pink Floyd's "Wish You Were Here" with an In Memoriam video tribute to late musicians and 311 fans Renee O'Neal, Meredith Hight, and Hexum's youngest brother Patrick.
March 11/12/13, 2020	Las Vegas	Park Theater	Night 1: 33 Night 2: 34 Night 3: 36	Celebrated 30 years of 311. 103 songs performed over 3 nights, including Bob Marley's "Lively Up Yourself" (311's first cover song) and the Rolling Stones' "Waiting on a Friend". Nick Hexum on guitar and his daughter, Echo, on piano performed an instrumental cover of Asia's "Only Time Will Tell".
March 11, 2021	Los Angeles	311's The Hive Studios	21	There was no physical 311 Day due to the COVID-19 pandemic, but there was a virtual performance of the album Transistor in its entirety at the 311 studio in North Hollywood, CA called "The Hive".
March 11/12, 2022	Las Vegas	Dolby Live	Night 1: 45 Night 2: 44	89 total songs were played, including a cover of John Lennon's "Imagine". P-Nut also covered Aaliyah's "Try Again" during the bass solo.
March 8/11/12, 2023	Caribbean Sea	Norwegian Pearl	Night 1: 23 Night 2: 25 Night 3: 25	First 311 day on a cruise; a total of 73 songs played.
March 9/10, 2024	Las Vegas	Dolby Live	Night 1: 43 Night 2: 43	86 total songs were played, including a cover of Billy Joel's "Only the Good Die Young". P-Nut also covered Paul Simon's "Graceland" and Daft Punk's "Around the World" during the bass solo. The March 10th show concluded after midnight on March 11. The band also released a Tiny Desk concert on March 11.
March 7/8, 2026	Las Vegas	Dolby Live	Night 1: 38 Night 2: 42	80 total songs were played.

== Caribbean Festival Cruises and Pow Wow Festival ==
In March 2011, 311 began hosting a Festival Cruise. The environment is similar to an outdoor music festival involving camping.

The 2011 Caribbean Festival Cruise departed on March 3, 2011, from Miami, FL aboard the Carnival Destiny for Grand Turk, Turk and Caicos. The festival cruise featured three shows, over four days leaving from Miami to Turks and Caicos, and featured guest bands: The Movement, DJ Soulman and Nocturnal Arts, Full Service, Pepper and The Expendables.

On May 10, 2012, 311 hosted their second Caribbean Festival Cruise on the Carnival Destiny, departing from Miami and landing on a private island, Half Moon Cay, in the Bahamas for three consecutive nights and featured guest bands including: The Dirty Heads, Shwayze, 2 Skinnee J's, DJ Soulman, Outlaw Nation, Shootyz Groove, BALLYHOO!, Passafire, Cisco, Full Service, DJ Trichrome, Exes Of Evil, Trailer Park Ninjas, Moral Defect among others.

311's 2013 Caribbean Festival Cruise departed Miami on March 1, 2013, on its new home, the Norwegian Pearl, but this time went to a different private island in the Bahamas, Great Stirrup Cay. The 2013 Caribbean Cruise featured guest bands and comedians including: Rebelution, Less Than Jake, Exes of Evil, DJ ABD, The Urge, Tom Green, Doug Benson, SA Martinez and Exes of Evil performing in their side project Ghostwolf. DJ Kilmore (From Incubus), BALLYHOO!, Badfish: A Tribute to Sublime, Bad Rabbits, The Aggrolites, DJ Soulam, Full Service, J Randy, Krooked Treez, Beat Squad, Trailer Park Ninjas, Hey Monea, DJ Trichome, and DJ ABD.

311's 2015 Caribbean Festival departed from Miami on February 25, 2015, aboard the Norwegian Pearl. It made port in Jamaica. The line up included 311 with three sets, Dirty Heads, Pepper, Chali 2na, RX Bandits, The Green, RDGLDGRN, Full Service, The Funk Hunters, Doug Benson, DJ Soulman, J Randy, Andy Haynes, Papafish, Beatcake, Singles, Tony Hinchcliffe, DJ Native Wayne, DJ Trichrome, The Unity All Stars, Headphone Disco among others.

2017 marked the fifth 311 Caribbean Cruise. Departed from Tampa to Cozumel, March 2–6, 2017, on board the Norwegian Jade as the Pearl was in drydock. Lineup of bands, DJs and comedians, including Rebelution, Reel Big Fish, Stick Figure, People Under the Stairs, Ballyhoo!, RDGLDGRN, Los Stellarians (side project of 311 member SA Martinez) and ILL Communication. The band headlined set lists as usual and hosted other bands as well. 311 played their hit songs plus debuting two new tracks; "Extension" and "Too Late" while also covering Prince's "Let's Go Crazy".

During 311 Day 2022, Nick Hexum announced that the 311 Caribbean Cruise will return in 2023. Just prior to 311 Day 2024, the band announced that the 311 Caribbean Cruise will return in March 2025.

311 hosted their first "Pow Wow" Festival from August 4 to 6, 2011, at the Spirit of the Suwannee Music Park in Live Oak, FL. Along with 311, it featured DJ Trichome, Murs, SOJA, Deftones, DJ Soulman, The Movement, Full Service, Streetlight Manifesto, The Dirty Heads, Sublime with Rome, Shinobi Ninja, Ballyhoo!, The Supervillains, Ozomatli, G. Love & Special Sauce, and comedians Doug Benson and Graham Elwood. Along with fire performances by Nocturnal Arts. 311 played four sets and the album Transistor in its entirety.

== Business collaborations ==
=== Beverages ===
In 2015, the band collaborated with Nebraska Brewing Company and Rock Brother Brewing on an amber ale named the "311 Amber Ale". The beer was available in Florida, Georgia, South Carolina, Nebraska, and southern California, with more Midwest locations originally planned. Many varieties of the beer were available for at-home delivery. As of 2026, the 311 Amber Ale is no longer in production. In February 2023, the band launched a new collaboration with El Segundo Brewing Company titled "Come Original IPA", a West Coast-style IPA distributed primarily in Southern California. This was followed in January 2024 by the release of "Stealing Hoppy Hours", a non-alcoholic hazy IPA produced in partnership with DrinkSip. The band also previously released "I'll Be Here Awhile", a honey apricot ale with Rock Brothers Brewing, which has since been discontinued.

=== Other collaborations ===
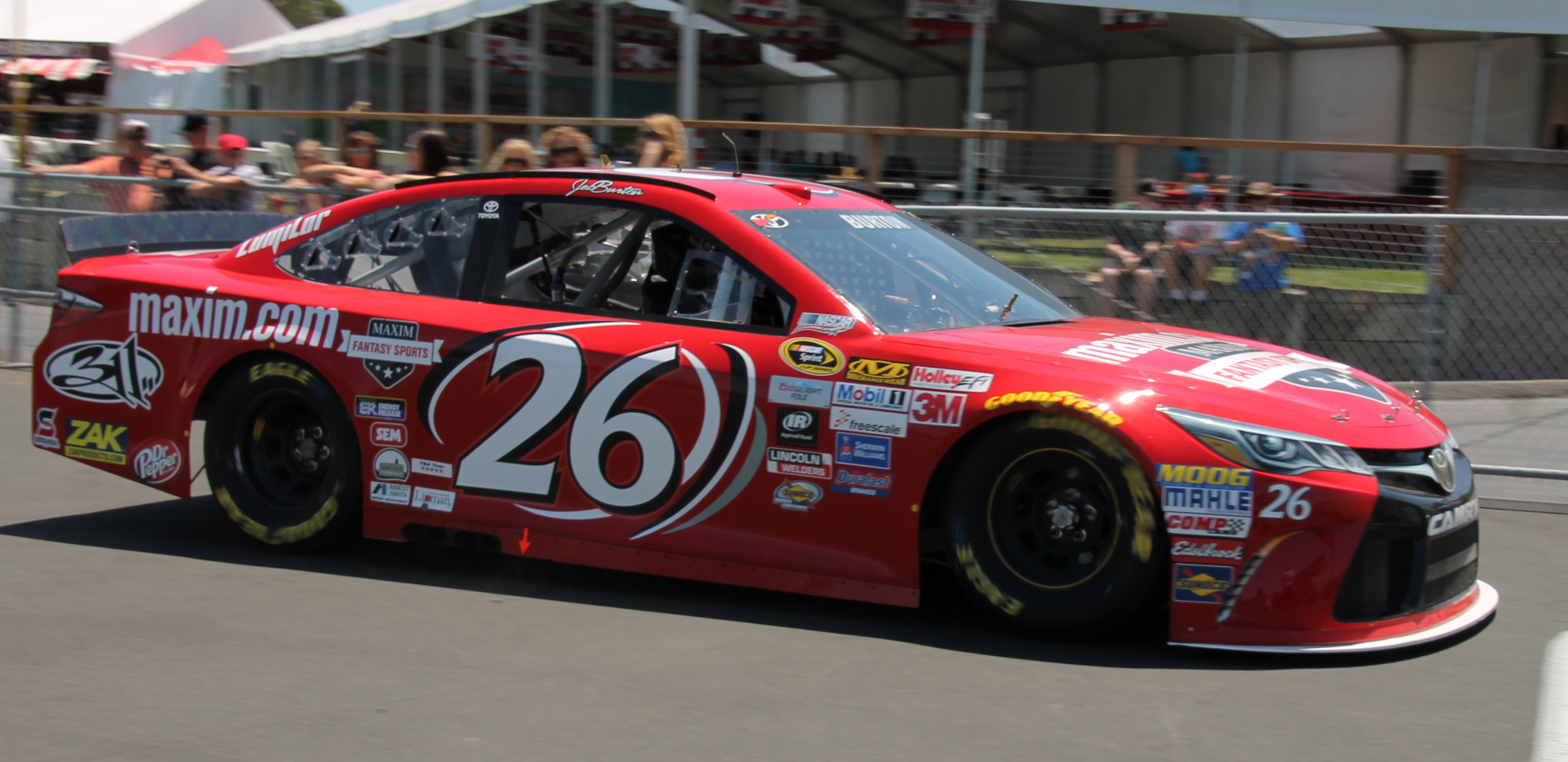
311 sponsored the NASCAR stock car of Jeb Burton in 2015

In 2017, they also released a cannabis vapor pen dubbed the "Grassroots Uplifter." The pen is available in Colorado, Washington, Oregon and California. In 2018, Grassroots Uplifter v2 was released in California. 311 are also official media sponsors for BK Racing on the NASCAR Sprint Cup series. The 311 logo appears on all BK Racing cars.

== Musical style and influences ==
311's music is a blend of rock, reggae, hip-hop and funk. 311 has been described as alternative rock, reggae rock, rap rock, funk metal, funk rock, rap metal, post-grunge, alternative metal and nu metal. 311 have also cited numerous bands and artists as influences, including The Clash, The Cure, Descendents, Red Hot Chili Peppers, Cypress Hill, Led Zeppelin, Bob Marley, Fishbone, Jane's Addiction, Faith No More, De La Soul, Public Enemy, and A Tribe Called Quest.

== Members ==
=== Current members ===
- Nick Hexum – vocals, rhythm guitar, keyboards, percussion, programming (1988–present), lead guitar (1988–1990)
- Aaron "P-Nut" Wills – bass guitar (1988–present)
- Chad Sexton – drums, percussion (1988–present)
- Tim Mahoney – lead guitar (1991–present)
- Doug "SA" Martinez – vocals, turntables, percussion (1992–present)

=== Former members ===
- Jim Watson – lead guitar (1990–1991)

=== Side projects ===
- Nick Hexum
  - The Nick Hexum Quintet – My Shadow Pages (2013)
  - DJ Leisure (Sean Perry) vs DJ Lofton (Nick Hexum) – Battlestations (1997)
- Doug "SA" Martinez
  - Ghostwolf – vocals – Lunar Halos (2012)
  - Los Stellarians – vocals
- Aaron "P-Nut" Wills
  - Ghostwolf – bass – Lunar Halos (2012)
  - Hollows Follow – First Birthday (2006)
- Chad Sexton – drums – Introducing Zack Hexum... (1998)

== Discography ==
- Music (1993)
- Grassroots (1994)
- 311 (1995)
- Transistor (1997)
- Soundsystem (1999)
- From Chaos (2001)
- Evolver (2003)
- Don't Tread on Me (2005)
- Uplifter (2009)
- Universal Pulse (2011)
- Stereolithic (2014)
- Mosaic (2017)
- Voyager (2019)
- Full Bloom (2024)
