= The Big One (Daddy Freddy album) =

Studio album by Daddy Freddy
- Released: 1994

Daddy Freddy chronology
Raggamuffin Soldier (1992)	The Big One (1994)	Greatest Hits (1996)

The Big One is an album by Daddy Freddy.

== Track listing ==
1. "Love Sick" – 5:18
2. "Keep Talkin'" – 4:39
3. "Pain Killa" – 5:07
4. "Rude Boy" – 5:19
5. "Thru The Dancehall" – 5:01
6. "The Girl Is Fine" – 5:10
7. "Spanish Lingua" – 5:07
8. "Mikey" – 0:10
9. "Boo Yaka" – 5:50
10. "How We Do It" – 4:20
11. "The Big One" – 5:15
12. "Bye Bye Love" – 5:17
13. "Keep Talkin (Dub Mix)" – 4:38
14. "Pain Killa (Full Length Mix)" – 5:08
15. "Pain Killa (Dubstrumental Mix)" – 5:07
