= Body Lasher =

Studio album by Daddy Freddy
- Released: 1986
- Genre: Raggamuffin
- Label: Sunset

Daddy Freddy chronology
Body Lasher	Ragamuffin Hip-Hop

Body Lasher is the debut album of Daddy Freddy ("The D.J. Chemist") on the Sunset label. The album was pressed to 12" vinyl for release.

== Track listing ==
1. "Miraculous" - 3:43
2. "Body Lasher" - 3:55
3. "In a Me Prime" - 3:46
4. "Jah Jah We Need" - 3:44
5. "Look How We Neat" - 4:01
6. "Some Girl a Model" - 3:43
7. "Get Fat" - 3:25
8. "Born Christian" - 3:59
9. "Zoo Party" - 3:14
