= Grassroots (album) =

Studio album by 311
- Released: July 12, 1994
- Recorded: 1993
- Studio: Mad Hatter (Los Angeles)
- Genres: Rap metal; reggae
- Length: 45:05
- Label: Capricorn
- Producers: Eddy Offord; 311

311 chronology
Music (1993)	Grassroots (1994)	311 (1995)

Singles from Grassroots
- 1. "Homebrew" Released: 1994; 2. "Lucky" Released: 1994; 3. "8:16 a.m." Released: 1995

Grassroots is the second studio album by American rock band 311, released on July 12, 1994, through Capricorn Records. The album was intentionally recorded to have a "muddy" tone, and was recorded in a small house in Van Nuys where all of the band members lived together. This album also contains the track "Applied Science", which is a staple in 311's live show and has included a full-band drum solo since 2000. P-Nut records with a five-string Warwick bass for the first time here as well. The album was certified gold in 1999 by the RIAA. With their second album, 311 started recording with Eddy Offord, but parted ways very early in the process. Funds for the album were cut off, but the band persevered by doing it themselves. 311 finished recording the album in their band house, leading to the unique sound of this record.

A special vinyl edition of the record was pressed for Black Friday in 2011 at United Record Pressing in Nashville, Tennessee.

== Critical reception ==
Professional ratings
Review scores
Source	Rating
AllMusic	4.5/5 stars
The Encyclopedia of Popular Music	3/5 stars
The Rolling Stone Album Guide	2/5 stars

Sandra Schulman of the South Florida Sun Sentinel chastised Grassroots for resembling "Beastie Boys meets the Spin Doctors", writing that while musical fusion is a "fine" template to work from, the album is unsuccessful for reminding them of the musical styles of other musicians, rather than presenting "something new to groove on". They also added that while 311 may have "a lot to say", "none of it is getting across" behind the group's funk bass backdrops, speedy tempos and "thick as thieves" lyrics. By contrast, J.D. Considine of the Tucson Citizen wrote that while 311 are stylistically similar to the Beastie Boys and the Red Hot Chili Peppers, there is "nothing secondhand" about the music on Grassroots, partly for the band's "more natural fusion of rock and rhyme" than the aforementioned groups in which sung and rapped parts "coexist in their own songs without seeming crowded together", and partly for the group's jazzy swing, as exemplified on songs like "8:16 a.m." He further praised the band for being energetic without "getting mirred in musical extremes".

Rodo Pocowatchit of The Wichita Eagle also drew comparisons to the Beastie Boys and Chili Peppers, as well as "a dash of Faith No More", but noted that the further incorporation of reggae, funk and hip-hop flavours and "biting, mile-a-minute lyrics" made Grassroots feel "as raw as any urban underground from-the-gut record", and praised the group's energy and tone. Retrospectively, Jacob N. Lunders of AllMusic selected Grassroots as an "Album Pick" and wrote that it was 311's artistic peak and one of 1994's most underrated records, adding that it "evenly balancing the band's rap-metal intensity with reggae vibrations, Grateful Dead-like jams, and hallucinogenic ambience." He recommended it to fans of the Red Hot Chili Peppers, Rage Against the Machine and Sublime, but also noted how the album "artistically ignores corporate rock's temptations of conformity, which consequently threaten the possibility of mainstream airplay."

== Track listing ==
No.	Title	Writer(s)	Length
1.	"Homebrew"	Hexum; SA Martinez; Tim Mahoney; Chad Sexton; Aaron "P-Nut" Wills	3:04
2.	"Lucky"	Hexum; Martinez; Sexton	2:50
3.	"Nutsymtom" (Appears as "Nutsymptom" in the liner notes)	Hexum; Martinez; Martinez; Sexton; Wills	3:01
4.	"8:16 a.m."	Hexum	3:43
5.	"Omaha Stylee"	Hexum; Martinez	4:14
6.	"Applied Science"	Hexum; Martinez; Sexton	2:44
7.	"Taiyed"	Mahoney; Martinez; Wills	1:49
8.	"Silver"	Hexum; Martinez; Mahoney; Sexton	2:47
9.	"Grassroots"	Hexum; Sexton	4:12
10.	"Salsa"	Hexum; Martinez; Mahoney; Sexton	2:27
11.	"Lose"	Hexum	4:17
12.	"Six"	Hexum; Martinez; Sexton	3:15
13.	"Offbeat Bare Ass"	Hexum; Martinez; Sexton; Wills	3:43
14.	"1, 2, 3"	Hexum; Sexton	2:59
Total length:			45:05

30th anniversary edition bonus tracks (also included on the Archive compilation)
No.	Title	Writer(s)	Length
15.	"Summer of Love"	Hexum	5:29
16.	"Homebrew" (Pre-Production Version)		2:58
17.	"Offbeat Bare Ass" (Pre-Production Version)		3:44
18.	"Six" (Pre-Production Version)		3:20
19.	"Lose" (Pre-Production Version)		4:16
Total length:			64:52

== Personnel ==
Credits adapted from album’s liner notes.

311

- Nick Hexum – lead vocals, rhythm guitar, programming
- S.A. Martinez – vocals, turntables
- Chad Sexton – drums, percussion, programming
- Tim Mahoney – lead guitar
- P-Nut – bass

Production

- Eddy Offord – producer, engineer
- Scott Ralston – drum recording
- Chris Shaw – mixing
- Chris Bellman – mastering
- Darin Back – photography

== Charts ==
Chart (1994)	Peak position
US Billboard 200	193
US Heatseekers Albums (Billboard)	8

== Certifications ==
Region	Certification	Certified units/sales
United States (RIAA)	Gold	500,000^{^}
^{^} Shipments figures based on certification alone.
