= Unity (311 album) =

Studio album by 311
- Released: 1991
- Recorded: 1990
- Studio: Rainbow Studios (Omaha, Nebraska)
- Genre: Alternative rock
- Length: 42:16
- Label: What Have You
- Producers: Nick Hexum, J.E. Van Horne

311 chronology
Dammit! (1990)	Unity (1991)	Hydroponic (1992)

Unity was 311's second independent release (following their 1990 album Dammit!) and first CD release on their own record company, What Have You Records. It was released in 1991 on both CD and Cassette. It is considered by some to be the band's second album if Dammit! is counted as their debut album. This album is no longer in print and is very rare, and there were only 1,000 original copies on CD and 500 on cassette that were pressed and released for this album. Three of the tracks on the album were re-recorded and released on the band's first major label album titled Music.

== Track listing ==
No.	Title	Writer(s)	Length
1.	"Slinky"	Nick Hexum	5:17
2.	"Feels So Good"	Hexum; SA Martinez; Chad Sexton	3:08
3.	"Do You Right"	Hexum; Sexton	4:27
4.	"!@#$ the &*?=!" (song title is "Fuck the Bullshit"*)	Hexum; Martinez; Tim Mahoney; Sexton; Aaron "P-Nut" Wills	2:54
5.	"Summer of Love"	Hexum	5:09
6.	"Unity"	Hexum; Sexton	3:18
7.	"Damn"	Hexum	3:31
8.	"Down South"	Hexum; Mahoney; Sexton; Marcus Watkins
9.	"Rollin'"	Hexum; Mahoney; Sexton; Watkins	3:12
10.	"Right Now"	Curt Grubb; Hexum; Sexton
11.	"C.U.T.M." (abbreviation for "Cosmic Utopian Thriving Mission")	Hexum; Wills	3:37
Total length:			42:16

Note

- * "Fuck the Bullshit" is listed as "F the B" in the liner notes.

== Personnel ==
- Tim Mahoney – guitar
- Chad Sexton – drums
- P-Nut – bass, vocals, percussion
- Nick Hexum – vocals, percussion
- Doug Martinez – guest vocals
- Produced and mixed by 311 and J.E. Van Horne
- Recorded and mixed at Rainbow Studios Omaha, Nebraska
