= Tetris (Doctor Spin song) =

1992 single by Doctor Spin

Single by Doctor Spin
- B-side: "Play Game Boy"
- Released: 21 September 1992
- Studio: Skratch (Surrey, England) ("Play Game Boy")
- Genre: Eurodance
- Length: 3:40 (7-inch mix)
- Label: Polydor; Carpet
- Songwriters: Nikolay Nekrasov; Hirokazu Tanaka; Andrew Lloyd Webber; Nigel Wright
- Producer: Nigel Wright

Audio
- "Tetris" on YouTube

"Tetris" is a song arranged by English composer Andrew Lloyd Webber and English record producer Nigel Wright, collaborating under the pseudonym Doctor Spin. The composition is based on the theme to the 1989 Game Boy game Tetris, which itself is based on the Russian folk song "Korobeiniki". Doctor Spin released their version of "Tetris" on 21 September 1992 through Polydor and Carpet Records; it reached number six on the UK Singles Chart and also charted in Austria, Finland, and Ireland. This song, along with "Supermarioland" by Ambassadors of Funk, "Supersonic" by H.W.A. and "Pac-Man" by Power-Pill commenced a brief trend of recreated video game music entering mainstream popularity.

== Origin and composition ==
The original composition that the main theme of Tetris is based on is the Russian folk song "Korobeiniki", which is a musical recreation of a poem by Russian poet Nikolay Nekrasov. The song used in the Game Boy version of Tetris was composed by Hirokazu Tanaka. In 1992, Andrew Lloyd Webber and Nigel Wright collaborated under the name Doctor Spin to record and release a Eurodance version of Tanaka's arrangement. The track was officially licensed by Nintendo.

== Release and success ==
Doctor Spin released "Tetris" through Polydor Records and Lloyd Webber's sublabel of Polydor, Carpet Records, on 21 September 1992 in four formats: CD, cassette, 7-inch vinyl, and 12-inch vinyl. The song debuted on the UK Singles Chart at number 22 on 27 September 1992 and ascended to its peak of number 6 three weeks later; it spent a total of eight weeks in the top 50 and was the 75th-best-selling hit of 1992 in the UK. In Ireland, "Tetris" debuted on the chart dated 8 October 1992 and peaked at number seven for two weeks. In mainland Europe, the song charted in Austria and Finland. In the latter country, "Tetris" peaked at number four on the Finnish Singles Chart in November 1992, while in Austria, the single peaked at number 23 and spent three weeks on the chart, in December 1992 and January 1993. On the Eurochart Hot 100, the song achieved a peak of number 26 on 7 November 1992. In Australia, the single was released on 10 May 1993 but did not enter the ARIA Singles Chart top 100.

On British music television programme Top of the Pops, the song was accompanied by several dancers dressed in outfits resembling the Tetrominos from Tetris. Along with "Supermarioland" by Ambassadors of Funk (which charted simultaneously with "Tetris"), "Supersonic" by H.W.A. (a charity single based on the Sonic the Hedgehog franchise) and "Pac-Man" by Power-Pill, the success of the composition began a brief period of popularity for novelty rave music.

== Track listings ==
- UK and European CD single
1. "Tetris" (7-inch mix)
2. "Tetris" (12-inch mix)
3. "Tetris" (hardcore mix)
4. "Play Game Boy"
- UK 7-inch and cassette single
1. "Tetris"
2. "Play Game Boy"
- UK 12-inch single

A1. "Tetris" (12-inch mix)
A1. "Tetris" (hardcore mix)
B1. "Tetris" (7-inch mix)
B2. "Play Game Boy"

== Credits and personnel ==
Credits are lifted from the UK CD single liner notes.

Studio

- "Play Game Boy" recorded at Skratch Studios (Surrey, England)

Personnel

- Andrew Lloyd Webber – traditional arrangement, executive production
- Nigel Wright – traditional arrangement, production
- Robin Sellars – engineering

== Charts ==
=== Weekly charts ===
Chart (1992)	Peak position
Austria (Ö3 Austria Top 40)	23
Europe (Eurochart Hot 100)	26
Finland (Suomen virallinen lista)	4
Ireland (IRMA)	7
UK Singles (Official Charts)	6
UK Airplay (Music Week)	40

=== Year-end charts ===
Chart (1992)	Position
UK Singles (OCC)	75
