= Live (311 album) =

Live album by 311
- Released: November 3, 1998
- Recorded: September 17, 1997
- Venue: UNO Lakefront Arena (New Orleans, Louisiana)
- Length: 56:03
- Label: Capricorn

311 chronology
Omaha Sessions (1998)	Live (1998)	Soundsystem (1999)

Alternative cover
- Imported Version of Live!

Live is the first live album by 311. Recorded during the Transistor tour. The album was recorded on September 17, 1997, at the UNO Lakefront Arena in New Orleans, Louisiana.

== Reception ==
Professional ratings
Review scores
Source	Rating
AllMusic	1.5/5 stars
The Encyclopedia of Popular Music	3/5 stars
Entertainment Weekly	D−
The Rolling Stone Album Guide	1.5/5 stars

Live received mostly negative reviews from critics, with AllMusic reviewer Jason Kaufman giving it a 1 and-a half star rating, saying "This concert document seems about as necessary as a pet rock." Kaufman added "Even with spacy songs like "Who's Got the Herb?," the blatant Santana rip-off guitar solos of "Nix Hex," and "Homebrew," the experience isn't good enough for a contact high associated with the best, or even semi-competent, live albums."

== Track listing ==
No.	Title	Length
1.	"Down"	3:14
2.	"Homebrew"	3:28
3.	"Beautiful Disaster"	4:04
4.	"Misdirected Hostility"	3:18
5.	"Freak Out"	3:49
6.	"Nix Hex"	5:03
7.	"Applied Science"	5:21
8.	"Omaha Stylee"	3:45
9.	"Tribute"	4:33
10.	"Galaxy"	2:58
11.	"Light Years" (Hexum)	2:51
12.	"Hydroponic"	5:17
13.	"Who's Got the Herb?" (David Byers, Earl Hudson, Paul Hudson)	3:56
14.	"Feels So Good"	4:22
