= Ragamuffin Hip-Hop =

Studio album by Asher D and Daddy Freddy
- Released: 1988
- Genre: Ragga
- Label: Music of Life (UK); Profile Records (U.S.)

Daddy Freddy chronology
Body Lasher (1986)	Ragamuffin Hip-Hop (1988)	Cater Fe She (1989)

Ragamuffin Hip-Hop is the only album by the ragga/hip hop duo Asher D and Daddy Freddy, released in 1988 on the Music of Life label.

The album was one of the first ever albums to showcase a fusion of distinctly hip-hop and dancehall elements together.

== Track listing ==
1. "Ragamuffin Hip Hop" - 5:30
2. "Africa" - 2:55
3. "Brutality" - 5:10
4. "Summertime" - 3:00
5. "Don't Stop, Do It" - 5:55
6. "Posse Rock & Move (5:45)
7. "Rough and Rugged (5:45)
8. "Run Come Follow We (5:00)
9. "Asher's Revenge (6:10)
