= Raggamuffin Soldier =

Studio album by Daddy Freddy
- Released: 1992
- Studios: Ameraycan (North Hollywood, CA); HC&F (New York, NY); Image (Hollywood, CA); Crystal Sound (Hollywood, CA)
- Genre: Ragga
- Length: 51:57
- Labels: Music Of Life; Chrysalis
- Producers: DJ Muggs; Robert Livingston; Super Cat; the Stone Cold Boners

Daddy Freddy chronology
Stress (1991)	Raggamuffin Soldier (1992)	The Big One (1994)

Singles from Raggamuffin Soldier
- 1. "Haul & Pull" Released: August 11, 1992; 2. "Respect Due" Released: 1992

Raggamuffin Soldier is a studio album by Jamaican ragga recording artist Daddy Freddy. It was released in 1992 via Music of Life/Chrysalis Records. The recording sessions took place at Ameraycan Studios in North Hollywood, at HC&F Studio in New York, at Image Recording Studios and at Crystal Sound Recording in Hollywood. The album was produced by Robert Livingston, DJ Muggs, the Stone Cold Boners, and Super Cat. It features guest appearances from Frankie Paul, Super Cat, and Vicki Calhoun. The album spawned two singles: "Haul and Pull" and "Respect Due".

== Critical reception ==
Professional ratings
Review scores
Source	Rating
AllMusic	4.5/5 stars
The Encyclopedia of Popular Music	3/5 stars

AllMusic's Ron Wynn praised Daddy Freddy's ability to juggle "idiomatic influences", calling it one of the few albums "to combine things from all styles rather than just throw them together". The Encyclopedia of Popular Music called Ragamuffin Soldier Daddy Freddy's best album. Reggae, Rasta, Revolution: Jamaican Music from Ska to Dub deemed it "the best and most diverse full ragga album available".

== Track listing ==
No.	Title	Writer(s)	Producer(s)	Length
1.	"Haul and Pull"	Frederick Nelson; Robert Livingston; Dennis Halliburton	Robert Livingston	3:25
2.	"Now or Never"	Nelson; Livingston; William Maragh	Robert Livingston	3:33
3.	"Respect Due" (featuring Frankie Paul)	Nelson; Paul Blake; Livingston; Halliburton; Dwight Myers	Robert Livingston	3:55
4.	"Vibe Up"	Nelson; Lawrence Muggerud	DJ Muggs	0:23
5.	"Jah Jah Gives Me Vibes"	Nelson; Muggerud	DJ Muggs	3:32
6.	"Give Me a Little Lovin'"	Nelson; Livingston; Halliburton; Myers	Robert Livingston	3:45
7.	"Don Number One"	Nelson; Muggerud	DJ Muggs	3:56
8.	"Rappin' Music" (featuring Super Cat)	Nelson; Livingston; Maragh; Halliburton	Robert Livingston; Super Cat	3:42
9.	"Kill Dem Freddy"	Nelson; Muggerud	DJ Muggs	1:26
10.	"Who Said Dat"	Nelson; Livingston; Halliburton	Robert Livingston; Super Cat	3:52
11.	"Murder Style"	Nelson; Matt Hyde; Skatemaster Tate	The Stone Cold Boners	4:35
12.	"Move On Up"	Nelson; Muggerud	DJ Muggs	3:57
13.	"What's Up Freddy"	Nelson; Hyde; Tate	The Stone Cold Boners	3:12
14.	"Hot"	Nelson; Hyde; Tate	The Stone Cold Boners	4:42
15.	"Raggamuffin Soldier"	Nelson; Hyde; Tate	The Stone Cold Boners	4:02
Total length:				51:57
