= My Shadow Pages =

Studio album by Nick Hexum Quintet
- Released: October 1, 2013
- Studio: Plyrz, Studio Hex
- Genre: Alternative rock
- Length: 57:14
- Label: What Have You
- Producer: Jim Scott

My Shadow Pages is the solo debut album released by American musician Nick Hexum, best known as lead singer of the band 311.

This surprise album was announced via social media on July 18, 2013, and was released on October 1, 2013. It was a very different approach to music than the hard rock of 311, instead being influenced by soft jazz and jam band styles. The cover art is reminiscent of the influential designs of Reid Miles for jazz label Blue Note records of the 1950s and ‘60s.

== Writing and recording ==
Hexum brought on several musicians to his project, whether for writing or for performing. His live band included his multi-instrumentalist brother Zack Hexum, drummer Gary Novak, keyboardist Luke Miller, and bassist Andrés Rebellón from Colombia (who Hexum discovered at a Musicians Institute audition).

As for writing this album, Hexum wrote with his bandmates as well as Sam Hollander, Tim Pagnotta, Kevin Griffin, and more.

== Promotion ==
The first song released from this album was "Blame the Sky" via an early listen on Yahoo!.

The second listen was "Sideways" on Fuse TV.

The third came in form of a lyrics video released on YouTube for "Super Natural".

=== Live performances and tour ===
The first hint heard of the Nick Hexum Quintet was actually on 311 Day 2012 when Hexum performed Bob Marley's "Waiting in Vain" solo, which was later recorded in similar fashion and put onto My Shadow Pages.

The Nick Hexum Quintet did head out on tour as well. They had a three night run at Hotel Cafe in October 2013 and went nationwide in January 2014.

The live show included songs from the album, 311 mash-ups and a 'dice jam'. For the 'dice jam' they would roll three dice and it would determine the mode, tempo and key of the song that they created on the spot.

== Track listing ==
My Shadow Pages track listing
No.	Title	Writer(s)	Length
1.	"Once in Your Life"	Nick Hexum, Sam Hollander	4:23
2.	"Just Give It to Me"	Nick Hexum, Kevin Griffin, Zachary Hexum	3:18
3.	"Somewhere in the Middle"	Nick Hexum, Kevin Griffin, Zachary Hexum	3:44
4.	"Blame the Sky"	Nick Hexum, Zachary Hexum	4:34
5.	"Tidal Wave"	Nick Hexum, Tim Pagnotta	5:03
6.	"The Dreamer"	Nick Hexum	4:36
7.	"Sideways"	Nick Hexum, Tim Pagnotta	5:05
8.	"You'll Do It Again"	Nick Hexum, Zachary Hexum, Luke Miller, Gary Novak, Andrés Rebellón	5:06
9.	"Waiting in Vain"	Bob Marley	3:32
10.	"Starry Eyes"	Nick Hexum, Zachary Hexum	4:47
11.	"The Getaway"	Nick Hexum, Sam Hollander, Andrés Rebellón	4:27
12.	"Super Natural"	Nick Hexum, Sam Hollander, Adam Pallin, David Katz	4:09
13.	"A Song for Driving"	Nick Hexum, Zachary Hexum, Luke Miller, Gary Novak, Andrés Rebellón	4:30
Total length:			57:14
