= Hydroponic (EP) =

EP album by the band 311

EP by 311
- Released: 1992
- Recorded: 1991
- Studio: Rainbow Studios (Omaha, Nebraska)
- Genre: Alternative rock; rap metal
- Length: 21:52
- Label: What Have You Records
- Producer: Nick Hexum

311 chronology
Unity (1991)	Hydroponic (1992)	Music (1993)

Hydroponic is an EP by 311, released in 1992. It was their last independent release before they were signed to Capricorn Records for their first studio album Music. It was considered the first EP with S.A. Martinez as an official member of the band. This EP was a six-track demo that contained four songs that would appear on their debut album Music. The four that made it to Music were all tuned down one half step. Before the official release of Hydroponic, the band made hand-written "pre-release" promo copies of the new EP and sold them at various shows (including the EP release party performance on 2/1/1992 at the "Peony Park Ballroom") as well as "Joe Voda's Drum City", which was Chad's mother's store, who now works at Dietze's Music in Bellevue, Nebraska. Pre-release promo copies were hand-written by the band (Chad Sexton) and sold at various shows as well as "Joe Voda's Drum City" (where Chad's mother worked at the time) before its official release on cassette. Most of the copies were hand-written by Chad Sexton himself and have been spotted on eBay.

Nick Hexum mentioned this at their performance on February 1, 1992, at the "Peony Park Ballroom" and therefore is one of 311's most highly valued collectibles. Currently out of print, this EP has become a collector's item.

On May 6, 2015, a remastered Hydroponic was released on 10-inch vinyl and CD through on the band's site.

== Track listing ==
No.	Title	Length
1.	"Welcome"	2:56
2.	"Plain"	2:58
3.	"Freak Out"	3:32
4.	"Soulsucker"	4:54
5.	"Nix Hex"	3:03
6.	"Today My Love"	4:27
Total length:		21:52

== Liner notes (official) ==
(Complete program on both sides)

- All Songs (C) 311 1992
- Chrome Tape/Dolby
