= Music (311 album) =

Studio album by 311
- Released: February 9, 1993
- Studio: Ocean (Burbank, California)
- Genre: Rap metal
- Length: 46:11
- Label: Capricorn
- Producer: Eddy Offord

311 chronology
Hydroponic (1992)	Music (1993)	Grassroots (1994)

Singles from Music
- 1. "Freak Out / My Stoney Baby / Hydroponic" Released: 1992

Professional ratings
Review scores
Source	Rating
AllMusic	4.5/5 stars
The Encyclopedia of Popular Music	2/5 stars
The Rolling Stone Album Guide	1.5/5 stars

Music is the debut studio album by American rock band 311. It was released on February 9, 1993, by Capricorn Records. The album was certified gold in 1999 by the RIAA.

== Background ==
There are only five tracks that were not included on 311's previous independent releases: "Visit", "Paradise", "Hydroponic", "My Stoney Baby", and "Fat Chance". However, all of the songs that had been previously released were altered, most notably "Do You Right", where nearly all of the lyrics were changed. Doug "SA" Martinez also changed his main verses in "Freak Out", "Feels So Good" and "Fuck the Bullshit". The breakdown in "Plain" was completely changed musically, and the lyrics were re-arranged. The first pressing was originally manufactured and distributed by Warner Bros. Records Inc. and thus bears the "WB" logo in the bottom right corner. Later issues were manufactured and distributed by RED in 1994, Mercury Records in 1996 and most recently Volcano.

== Track listing ==
All tracks are written by Nick Hexum, SA Martinez, and Chad Sexton, except where noted.

No.	Title	Writer(s)	Length
1.	"Welcome"		2:55
2.	"Freak Out"		3:43
3.	"Visit"	Hexum; Martinez; Tim Mahoney; Sexton; Aaron "P-Nut" Wills	3:40
4.	"Paradise"	Hexum; Martinez; Mahoney; Sexton; Wills	5:02
5.	"Unity"	Hexum; Sexton	3:26
6.	"Hydroponic"		3:53
7.	"My Stoney Baby"	Hexum; Martinez	3:44
8.	"Nix Hex"	Hexum; Martinez	4:08*
9.	"Plain"	Hexum	2:57
10.	"Feels So Good"		3:22
11.	"Do You Right"		4:17
12.	"Fat Chance"		5:04†
Total length:			46:11

30th anniversary edition bonus tracks (also included on the Archive compilation)
No.	Title	Writer(s)	Length
15.	"Welcome" (Pre-Production Version)		3:01
16.	"Visit" (Pre-Production Version)	Hexum; Martinez; Mahoney; Sexton; Wills	3:38
17.	"Feels So Good" (Pre-Production Version)		3:17
18.	"Paradise" (Pre-Production Version)	Hexum; Martinez; Mahoney; Sexton; Wills	5:13
Total length:			61:28

- * "Nix Hex" contains the hidden track "Raga Drop" (feat. Daddy Freddy) (
  - Hexum
  - Martinez
  ), which is included separately as track 9 on the 30th anniversary edition, moving the rest of the album's tracks down one number.
- † "Fat Chance" Contains the hidden track "Fuck the Bullshit" (
  - Hexum
  - Martinez
  - Mahoney
  - Sexton
  - Wills
  ), which is listed separately as track 14 on the 30th anniversary edition. "Fat Chance" is listed as track 13 on the 30th anniversary edition.

== Personnel ==
Credits adapted from album's liner notes.

311

- Nick Hexum – lead vocals, guitar, percussion
- SA Martinez – lead and background vocals
- Chad Sexton – drums, percussion
- Tim Mahoney – guitar
- Aaron Wills – bass

Guest musicians

- Daddy Freddy – vocals on "Nix Hex"

Production

- Eddy Offord – producer, engineer
- Mike Geiser – assistant engineer
- Scott Ralston – assistant engineer
- Joe Gastwirt – mastering

== Charts ==
Chart performance for Music
Chart (1996)	Peak position
US Top Catalog Albums (Billboard)	13
US Heatseekers Albums (Billboard)	37

== Certifications ==
Region	Certification	Certified units/sales
United States (RIAA)	Gold	500,000^{^}
^{^} Shipments figures based on certification alone.
