= Music of Life =

British independent music label

- Parent company: Music Manager (company) (owner)
- Founded: 1986
- Founder: Simon Harris; DJ Froggy
- Status: Inactive
- Distributor: Music Manager
- Genre: UK rap
- Country of origin: United Kingdom
- Official website: musicoflife.com

Music of Life is a British independent hip hop and dance music label formed in 1986 by Froggy and Simon Harris, managed by Chris France.

At first, the label licensed new rap music from US production company Powerplay for the first compilation album Def Beats 1, but as an addition to the US material, Harris produced an extra track under his own 'Music of Life Productions' recorded in London by the label's A&R man Derek Boland. "Rock the Beat" by Derek B created a demand for British hip-hop; the label signed artists including the Demon Boyz and Daddy Freddy.

Music Week wrote in 1988 that Music of Life was "the most successful hip hop label in the UK right now." Record Mirror identified Music of Life as one of the few hip hop labels "to believe in home grown talent." In 1989, Studio Week magazine called Music of Life "the foremost rap label in this country at the moment."

Furthermore, in 1989, Music of Life expanded its portfolio with the launch of its sister label, Living Beat. Specialising in dance music, house, and pop recordings, Living Beat achieved chart success with releases such as "Supermarioland", which reached No. 9 on the UK Singles Chart. Notable contributions include Harris's collaboration with Nintendo under the pseudonym 'Ambassadors of Funk', Samantha Fox's "Go for the Heart", and facilitating Prince's first UK No. 1 single, "The Most Beautiful Girl in the World".

The label's founder, Harris, is credited with producing a series of breakbeat albums, comprising 12 volumes of Beats, Breaks & Scratches. Collaborations with prominent artists such as Norman Cook (Fatboy Slim), Paul Oakenfold, Afrika Bambaataa, and George Clinton have resulted in the production and release of similar influential albums, all of which formed an integral part of the Music of Life catalogue.

== Artists roster ==
The Music of Life catalog includes songs from:

- MC Duke & DJ Leader 1
- She Rockers (featuring Betty Boo)
- Daddy Freddy
- Asher D
- Tenor Fly
- Nitty Gritty
- Derek B
- Hijack
- Hardnoise
- Norman Cook
- Paul Oakenfold
- George Clinton
- Simon Harris (label founder)
- Ambassadors of Funk
- Afrika Bambaataa
- Demon Boyz
- Professor Griff
- Clyde Stubblefield
- Overlord X
- Thrashpack

== See also ==
- Lists of record labels
