= Nick Hexum =

American musician (born 1970)

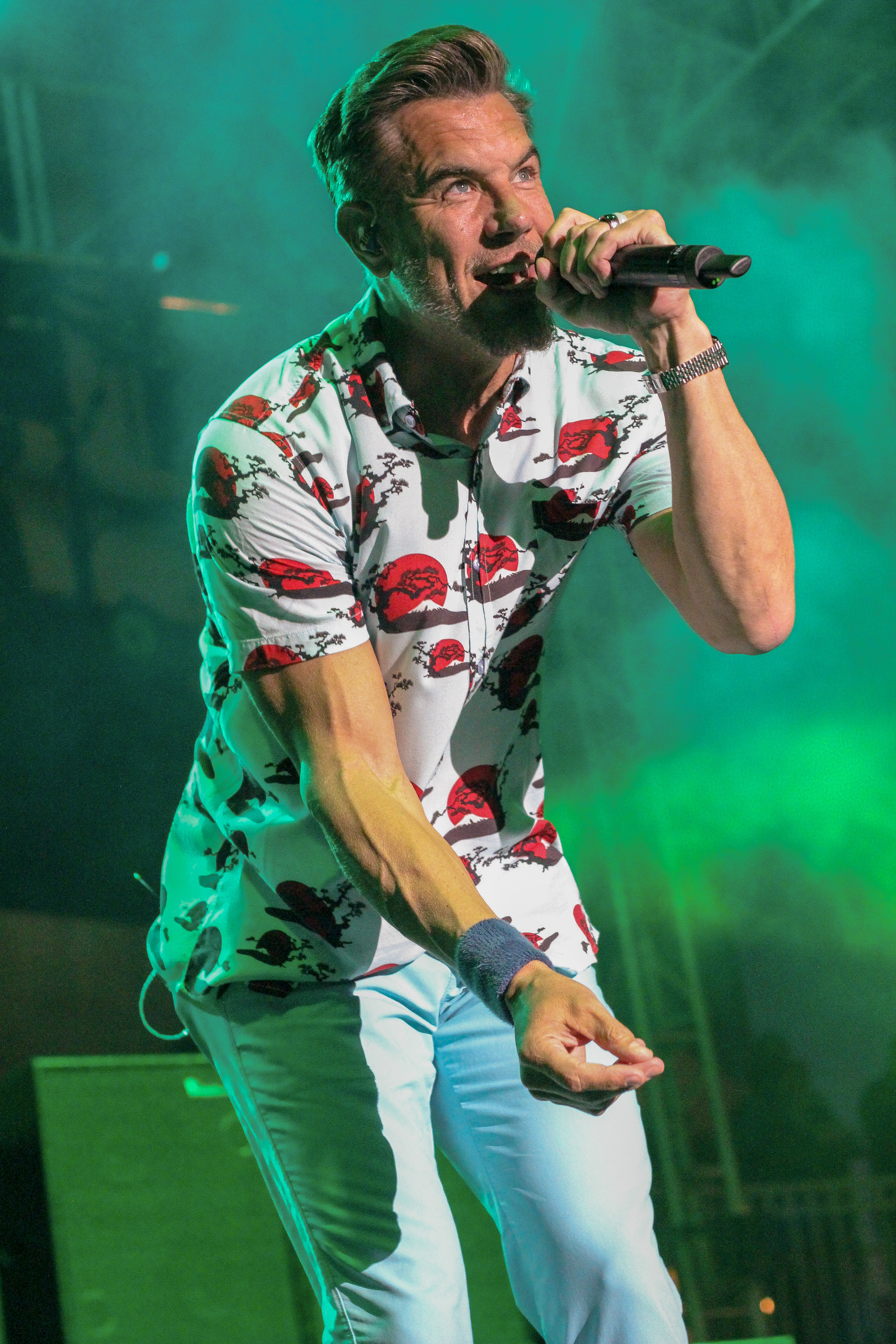
- Hexum performing in 2023

Background information
- Also known as: DJ Lofton
- Born: Nicholas Lofton Hexum; April 12, 1970 (age 56); Madison, Wisconsin, U.S.
- Origin: Omaha, Nebraska, U.S.
- Genres: Alternative rock; hard rock; reggae rock; rap rock; experimental rock; ska punk; funk rock; dub
- Occupations: Musician; singer; rapper; songwriter
- Instruments: Vocals; guitar
- Years active: 1985–present
- Member of: 311; The Nick Hexum Quintet
- Spouse: Nikki Nelson (m. 2008)
- Children: 3
- Website: www.nickhexum.com www.311.com

Nicholas Lofton Hexum (born April 12, 1970) is an American singer, rapper, songwriter and guitarist who is the frontman for the alternative rock band 311 and The Nick Hexum Quintet.

== Early life ==
Born in Madison, Wisconsin, to father Dr. Terry Hexum, a professor of pharmacology at the University of Nebraska Medical Center and cardiovascular and neuroscience researcher, and mother Pat, Hexum went to Westside High School in Omaha, Nebraska. School led Hexum to music programs, such as Westside Jazz Band, where he met Chad Sexton. Hexum views his first rock 'n' roll performance as a junior high talent show under the name The Clash.

In 1985, Hexum started a band with school friends. This is the first group where he had another member of 311 as a bandmate as Tim Mahoney was the lead guitarist. Other members included Ward Bones, Andy Gray, Lon Breslow, and Ed Birmingham. Their band was called The Eds after their drummer. They performed at school functions, even winning local battle of the bands. The group played together for a few years before disbanding.

In 1988, Hexum linked with Mahoney and jazz band friend Chad Sexton to form a band named Unity. The line-up changed when they graduated high school. Mahoney and Sexton decided to head to college. Chad Sexton returned from a short stint at University of Nebraska and Unity was revived without Mahoney. Hexum, Sexton, Ward Bones, and Marcus Watkins formed this new line-up and moved to Los Angeles to make an effort for recognition. However, this group soon parted ways.

Hexum moved to Germany for a brief stint in 1990. After a few months, he got a call from Sexton. He had linked up with Aaron Wills and Jim Watson. Their band, Fish Hippos, had a gig with Fugazi on June 10, 1990, at Sokol Auditorium and he invited Hexum to join the band. Hexum agreed, but said they needed to change the band's name. They settled on 311 and announced that from stage. The band views this show as their birth.

== Career ==
=== 311 ===
311's birth is viewed as their first show together at Sokol Auditorium on June 10, 1990. At that time, they were entirely independent and Hexum served as the band's manager and distributor. He took out a student loan and used the money to record in a local, professional studio and 311 released three independent albums, Dammit!, Unity, and Hydroponic on Hexum's own independent label What Have You Records.

In 1992, the band felt they'd done all they could on the local scene and moved out to Los Angeles to pursue a record deal. Since Hexum had been proactive on the business end, demo tapes had been sent to many record labels. One made its way to producer Eddy Offord, who took interest in working with the band. All of this culminated in 311 signing a record deal with Capricorn Records. In 1993, 311 released their first major label album, titled Music.

311 has released 14 major label records without a change in the band's line-up. They have performed over 2,000 shows in 29 countries and all 50 U.S. states. Hits include "Down", "Love Song", "Amber", "All Mixed Up", "You Wouldn't Believe", "Creatures (For a While)", and many more.

=== Solo music ventures ===
In 2013, Hexum announced a solo record under the name Nick Hexum Quintet, releasing an LP titled My Shadow Pages. This was a stylistic departure from 311, and more influenced by jazz and jam bands. He toured with the Quintet in 2013 and 2014.

In 2025, Hexum again announced another venture, this time under his own name. He announced the release of an EP every other month during 2025. He held listening parties the night before release dates on various socials such as Twitch, YouTube, Instagram and TikTok.

Waxing Nostalgic was released February 26, 2025, and lent itself to Americana, acoustic singer-songwriter stylings. Hexum worked with musicians, such as Kenny Feinstein from Water Tower (band), Jared Masters, Colin Blanton, Brasko; as well as family in his sister Angie and daughter Echo. It was mixed by Bob Horn and Hexum himself. Tracklist included Cosmic Connection, 1978, Work of Fiction, Lonely Existence.

Full Memories was released April 23, 2025. The music carried a similar style to Waxing Nostalgic. He worked with others on these tracks including similar names in Kenny Feinstein and Thomas Drinkard from Water Tower (band), his sister Angie Hexum, Colin Blanton, Andres Rebellon from the Nick Hexum Quintet; as well as new names in Alan Hampton, Ben Kweller, John Moran, Joel Martin and Rami Jaffee. This EP has five songs; Just To See You Smile, Please Explain, Careless, Where I Belong, California (Chappell Roan cover).

Waning Time was released August 1, 2025. While some collaborators on this project remain constant, such as Kenny Feinstein and Thomas Drinkard from Water Tower (band), Colin Blanton and Brasko, others are new. Hexum collaborated with Brian Simpson, Drew Vandenberg, Cece Coakley, Nick Rosen. This EP has four songs; Solitude (Billie Holiday cover), Lost Counting, I Am Open, I'd Like To Write You.

Hexum announced that a vinyl edition of all three EPs, titled Phases of Hope And Hollow. The vinyl edition has two additional songs; One Breath At A Time and Everybody's Talkin' (Harry Nilsson cover). A deluxe vinyl edition was released in 2026, featuring 10 new tracks, including three original songs —Turn Away, All Too Real, and I'm a Part of You — as well as covers of Ripple (Grateful Dead), Happiness (Elliott Smith), and Swallow (Larry McNeely), in addition to re-envisioned versions of Careless, California, and 311's Amber and Don't Dwell.

Hexum also toured with Water Tower (band) backing him in September 2025 on the Nothing But The Truth 2025 tour and continued to tour on Nothing But The Truth 2026 in January–February on the west coast and nationwide March - April.

=== Outside ventures ===
From his own clothing line to his non-profit awareness group, Hexum has held many interests outside of music. The two worlds combined in the early 2022 when Hexum became a Chief Artist at a start-up tech company called SKP.

SKP (a play on the word 'escapee') was designed to help music artists bypass the major label network and find the tools they need without sacrificing their rights. To do this, they've created a network where young artists can get the help a major label would provide, such as distribution and marketing, without the need to sign a major label contract. The upcoming artists can retain their own equity and control over their own music and direction.

Hexum is also part owner of Union Omaha, a soccer team in his hometown on Omaha, NE.

== Personal life ==
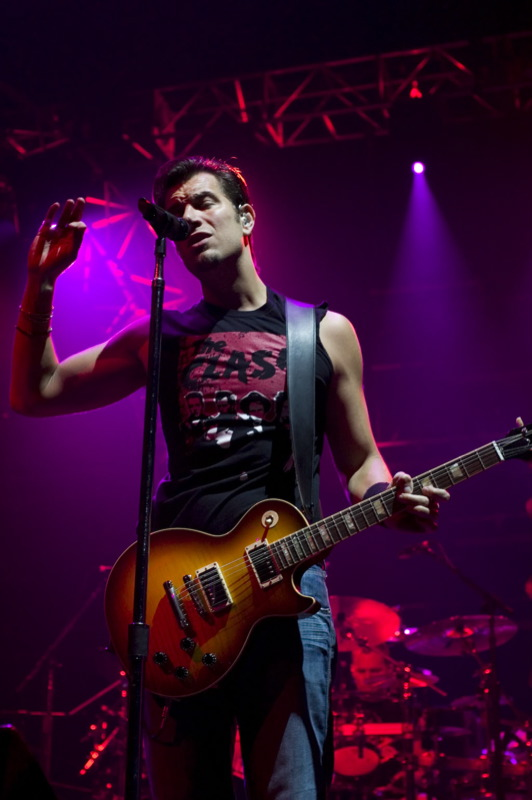
Hexum in 2007

Hexum is a middle child. His siblings are Angela, Zack, and Patrick. Zack is a songwriter and musician, with album releases and scoring credits. He has toured with his brother for the Hexum Brothers Rock For Kerry (2005) and for the Nick Hexum Quintet (2014) and has recorded and written for 311 on "Reggae Got Soul" (recorded horns) and "Forever Now" (songwriting credits). Patrick died fighting an opioid addiction.

Hexum dated singer Nicole Scherzinger between 2000 and 2004; the couple were engaged but never married. Hexum married his wife Nikki on New Year's Eve 2008. They have three daughters. Their oldest daughter, Echo, was born in a home birth on August 29, 2009. She performed live with her father at 311 Day 2020, and 2026 playing piano. Their second daughter, Maxine, was born May 1, 2011, which happened to occur on Nikki's birthday. Due to the absence of the family's midwife, Hexum performed the delivery. Their third daughter, Harlow, was born September 16, 2014. She has numerous acting credits, including in the TV series Agents of S.H.I.E.L.D. as Alya, American Gigolo as young Isabelle Desnain, and Yo Gabba Gabbaland! as herself.

Hexum has been known to support numerous charities, such as MusiCares, ChooseLove, Multiple Myeloma Research Foundation and others.

== Discography ==
=== 311 ===
- Dammit! (1990)
- Unity (1991)
- Hydroponic EP (1992)
- Music (1993)
- Grassroots (1994)
- 311 (1995)
- Transistor (1997)
- Soundsystem (1999)
- From Chaos (2001)
- Evolver (2003)
- Don't Tread on Me (2005)
- Uplifter (2009)
- Universal Pulse (2011)
- Stereolithic (2014)
- Mosaic (2017)
- Voyager (2019)
- Full Bloom (2024)

=== The Nick Hexum Quintet ===
- My Shadow Pages (2013)

=== with George Clanton ===
- "Crash Pad" b/w "King for a Day" (2019)
- "Under Your Window" b/w "Out of the Blue" (2019)
- George Clanton & Nick Hexum (2020)

=== as Nick Hexum ===
Albums:

- Phases of Hope and Hollow (Aug 2025)

EPs:

- Waxing Nostaglic (Feb 2025)
- Full Memories (Apr 2025)
- Waning Time (Aug 2025)

Singles:

- "Ocean Eyes" (2021, single)
- "St. Judy's Comet" (2021, single)
- "Don't Know What" (2021, single)

=== Guest appearances ===
- The Urge – Master of Styles (1998, vocals on "Jump Right In")
- Joe Strummer – Chef Aid: The South Park Album (1998, guitar on "It's A Rockin' World")
- Sugar Ray – Sugar Ray (2001, vocals on "Stay On")
- Goldfinger – The Knife (2017, vocals on "Liftoff")
- Dirty Heads – Swim Team (2017, vocals on "So Glad You Made It")
- Neverending White Lights – Act 1: Goodbye Friends of the Heavenly Bodies (2006, vocals on "Age of Consent")
- Disco Fries – Autonomous (2015, vocals on "Head in the Clouds")
- Infected Mushroom – IM25 (2022, vocals on "Business as Usual")
- Tropidelic – All The Colors (2022, vocals on "Falling Down")
- HR – Everything You Do (2023, vocals and guitar on "Everything You Do")
- The Movement – Visions (2025, vocals on "So Cool")
- The Ries Brothers – Golden Sun (2023, vocals and guitar on "Golden Sun")
- The Kingston Lions – Armagideon Time (2025, vocals)
- Coheed and Cambria – Goodbye, Sunshine (Endless Summer) (2025, vocals)
- Water Tower (band) – Dim Summers (2026, vocals)
- RDGLDGRN – I've Been Missing (2026, vocals)
