= Derek B =

British rapper (1965–2009)

- Also known as: EZQ
- Born: Derek Boland; 15 January 1965; Hammersmith, London, England
- Died: 15 November 2009 (aged 44) London, England
- Genres: Hip hop; British hip hop
- Occupations: Rapper, songwriter, MC
- Instruments: Vocals
- Years active: 1986–2009
- Labels: Profile, Orchard; Music of Life, Tuff

Derek Boland (15 January 1965 – 15 November 2009), better known by his stage name Derek B, was a British rapper. His most commercially successful releases were "Goodgroove" and "Bad Young Brother" in 1988.

== Biography ==
Born in Hammersmith, London, to Trinidadian nurse Jenny Boland, he was raised in Woodford. He attended Churchfields Junior School. When he was fifteen years old he began DJing in a mobile unit around London, before joining local pirate radio stations such as Kiss FM and LWR, and finally starting his own station, WBLS (not to be confused with the radio station of the same name in New York City).

He joined Simon Harris's Music of Life record label, as the closest thing the company had to an A&R man. When a planned compilation of US hip hop called Def Beats 1 (Music of Life, 1986) ran short of tracks, Boland stepped in to record a track called "Rock the Beat". He co-produced the track with Harris, rapped on it under the pseudonym EZQ, and also did his own deejaying under the name "Derek B". "Rock the Beat" (Music of Life, 1987) was released as a single, and was followed by three more – the most successful of which were "Goodgroove" (Music of Life, 1988), and "Bad Young Brother", both of which reached No. 16 on the UK Singles Chart. Derek B's third and final UK chart entry was "We've Got the Juice", which peaked at No. 56.

Derek B was the first UK rapper to achieve pop success, appearing on BBC Television's Top of the Pops at a time when the only other rappers who had appeared were Break Machine and Doug E. Fresh. He received criticism for rapping under an assumed American accent, something which was popular in the early days of British hip-hop, but later abandoned by some artists.

Following his chart success, Derek B was signed up to Rush Artist Management and released singles and the album, Bullet from a Gun (Tuff Audio, 1988).

Derek B was also successful as a record producer and remixer, working with the Cookie Crew, Thrashpack, and Eric B and Rakim. In 1988, he also helped to write the Liverpool F.C. anthem "Anfield Rap".

He died of a heart attack in London on 15 November 2009, aged 44.

== Legacy ==
He is dissed on the Harry Enfield single "Loadsamoney (Doin' Up the House)": "Derek B??? On – your – bike!"

== Discography ==
=== Albums ===
- Bullet from a Gun (1988, Tuff Audio) – UK No. 11

=== Singles ===
- "Rock the Beat" (1987)
- "Get Down" (1987) R&B No. 82, UK No. 87
- "Good Groove" (February 1988) R&B No. 61, UK No. 16
- "Bad Young Brother" (April 1988) UK No. 16
- "We've Got the Juice" (June 1988) UK No. 56
- "You've Got to Look Up" (1990)
