= Simon Harris (music producer) =

British music producer, DJ and electronic musician (1962–2026)

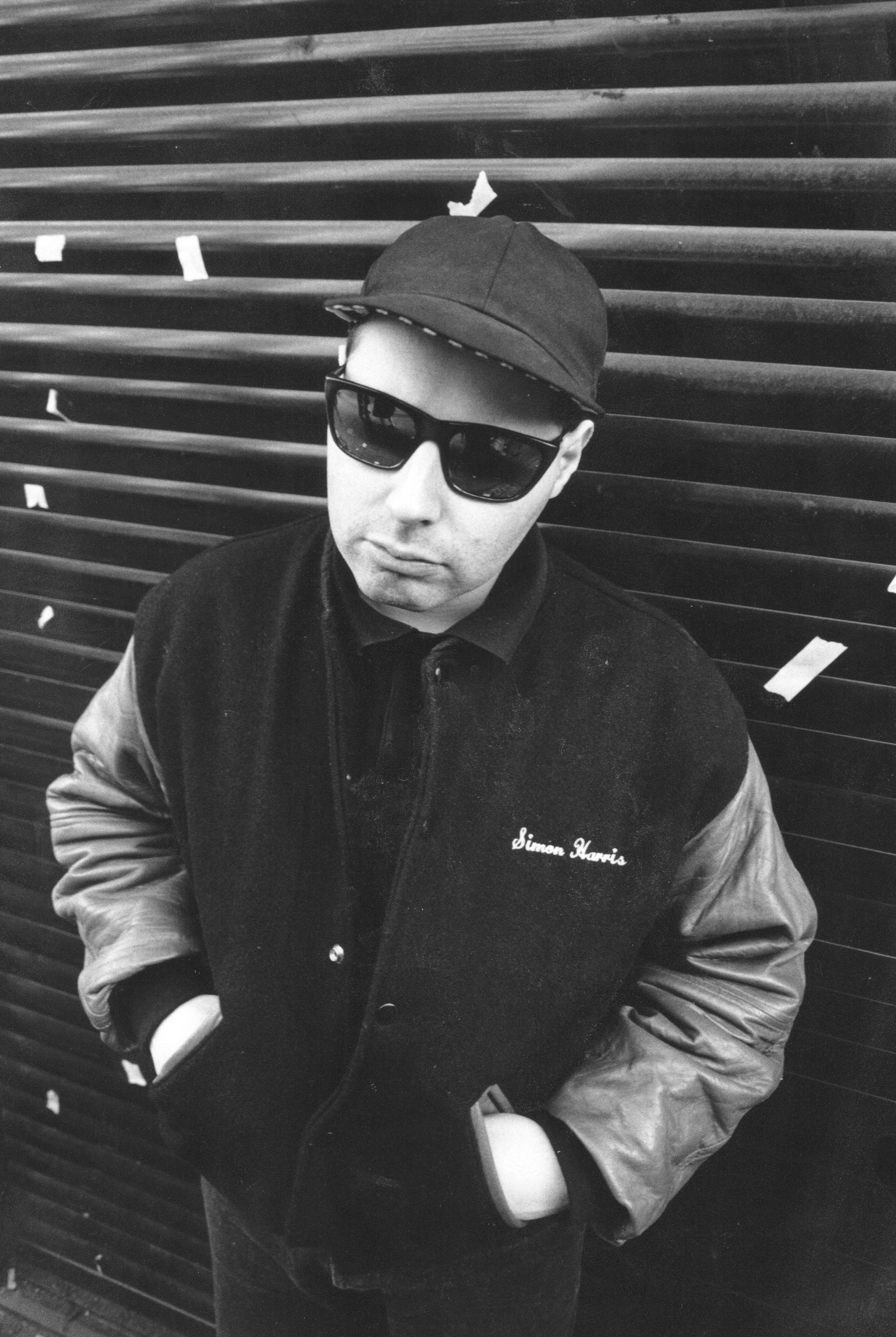
- Harris in 1988

Background information
- Born: 10 September 1962; London, England
- Died: 13 February 2026 (aged 63) London, England
- Occupations: Record producer; DJ; musician; remixer
- Years active: 1977–2026

Simon Harris (10 September 1962 – 13 February 2026) was a British music producer, DJ, remixer and electronic musician from London, predominantly known for his 1988 hit song "Bass (How Low Can You Go?)". He was also the founder of the hip-hop label Music of Life and produced much of its catalogue.

== Life and career ==
Harris started as a mobile DJ in the Chigwell, Essex area in 1977 and became known for his mixing. In 1979, he became a DJ at Radio Forest Hospital Radio and promoted disco events featuring Capital Radio DJs. In 1981, Harris met Froggy at one of these events and the two then formed a mixing team which resulted in a succession of releases including the 1986 "You to Me Are Everything (The Decade Remix 76/86)" by the Real Thing; the single reached number 5 on the UK Singles Chart.

Froggy and Harris then decided to launch their own label, Music of Life which was initially distributed by StreetSounds. Then, in 1986, Froggy left and Harris took the direction of Music of Life into hip hop and the label released several early British hip hop tracks by artists including Derek B, the Demon Boyz, Asher D and Daddy Freddy and Einstein but it was the series of breakbeat albums Beats, Breaks and Scratches which included sampled scratches that were released in territories such as Germany and the US. Harris was signed to UK label FFRR by Pete Tong in 1987 with the initial release being Bad on the Mic and remixes for Joyce Sims, Steve "Silk" Hurley, D-Mob featuring Gary Haisman, and Sinitta for Simon Cowell's Fanfare label and then also featured in music production magazines describing the sampling technique included on the 1988 FFRR Records album, Bass and numerous radio mixes including Dave Pearce's 'Fresh start to the week' in 1988 and covered in UK magazine Hip Hop Connection. In 1992, Harris produced the Ambassadors of Funk with a UK top 10 hit. Harris's association with sampling evolved from vinyl onto the sampling CD in the 1990s and then more recently to digital releases on the Mastermix DJ label, Plus Soda Music in Greece. "Bass (How Low Can You Go?)" was remixed in 2016 by German production team Milk & Sugar. Harris was involved in many remix projects including the songs "Boogie Nights" and "Gangsters of the Groove" for Heatwave, the first ever official Elvis Presley remix for BMG Rights Management "Bossa Nova Baby", Grace Jones, Prince's No. 1 hit "The Most Beautiful Girl in the World" and more recent DJ productions on Traxsource and the ELROW Music release "This Is Serious" with Morrison which was remixed by Dennis Ferrer and featured successfully on the BBC Radio 1 Friday night dance shows.

Harris died on 13 February 2026, at the age of 63.

== Discography ==
=== Singles ===
Year	Single	Peak positions			Album
Year	Single	UK	GER	US Dance	Album
1987	"Bad on the Mike" (featuring 3 Boom MC's)	–	–	–	Single only
1988	"Bass (How Low Can You Go)"	12	47	3	Bass!
1988	"Here Comes That Sound"	38	–	14	Bass!
1989	"(I've Got Your) Pleasure Control" (featuring Lonnie Gordon)	60	–	23	Bass!
1989	"Another Monsterjam" (featuring Einstein)	65	–	23	Bass!
1990	"Ragga House (All Night Long)" (featuring Daddy Freddy)	56	–	–	Disturbing the Peace
1990	"Don't Stop the Music" (featuring Dina Carroll & Monte Luv)	84	–	–	Disturbing the Peace
1990	"Time" (featuring Leslie Lyrics)	–	–	–	Disturbing the Peace
1991	"Louder Than a Shotgun"	–	–	–	Back to the Bass
1991	"Summertime"	–	–	–	Back to the Bass
1992	"Rollin' with the Punches"	–	–	–	Back to the Bass
"—" denotes releases that did not chart or were not released.
