= 311 discography =

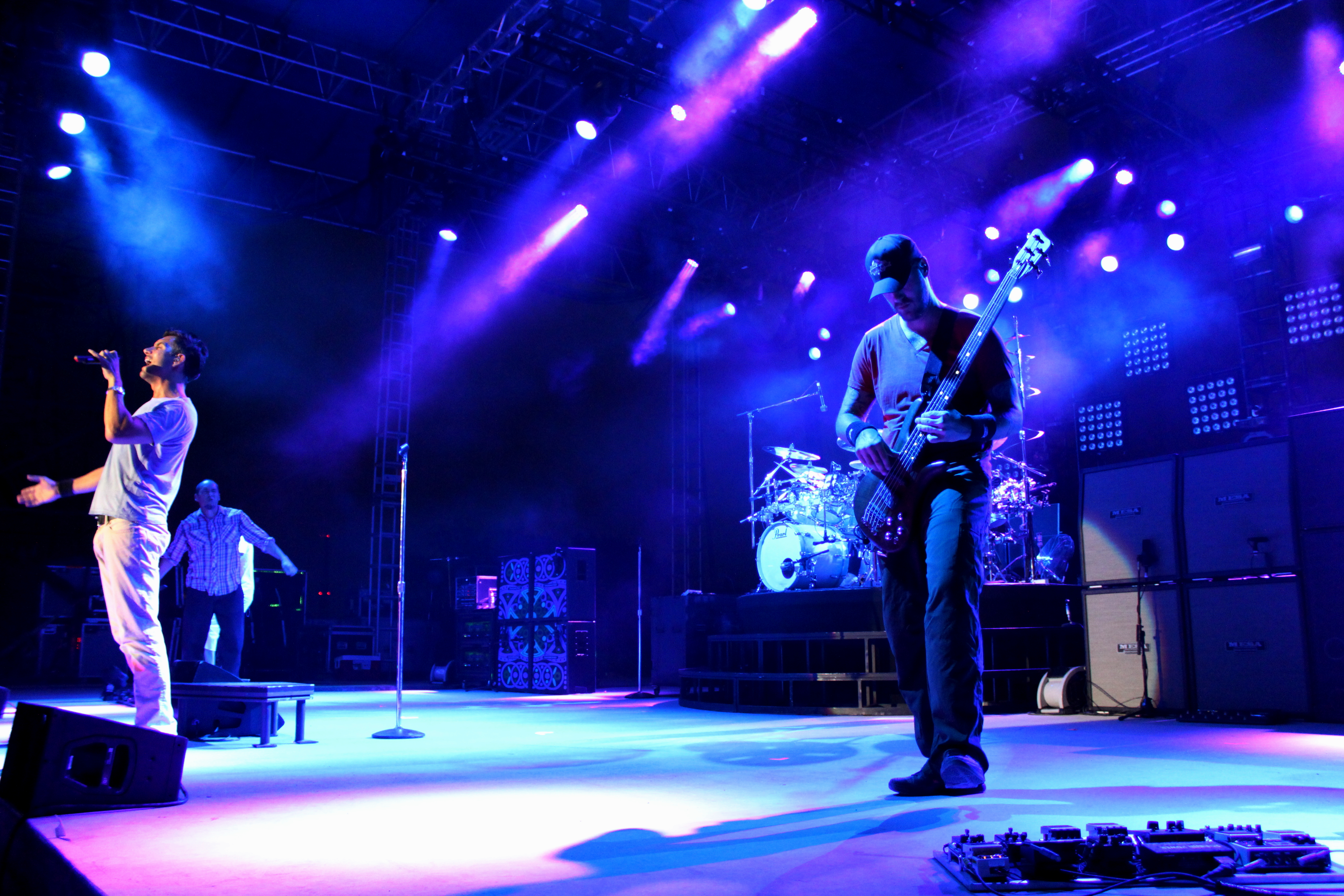
- 311 performing in Austin, Texas on August 14, 2011.
- Studio albums: 14
- Extended plays: 5
- Live albums: 1
- Compilation albums: 6
- Singles: 33
- Video albums: 7
- Music videos: 28

The comprehensive discography of 311, a rock band, originally from Omaha, Nebraska, consists of fourteen studio albums, one live album, twenty-four live concerts released via Live311 four compilation albums, five extended plays, thirty-three singles, and seven video albums.

Their first two studio albums, 1990's Dammit! and 1991's Unity, did not chart. Their next two studio albums, 1993's Music and 1994's Grassroots, both appeared on the Top Heatseekers chart.

The band's 1995 studio album 311 went three times platinum in the United States to become their best-selling album. It peaked at number 12 on the Billboard 200. The single "Down" reached number one on the Alternative Songs chart, and the single "All Mixed Up" reached number four. After that, 311 released the studio album Transistor in 1997. It peaked at number four on the Billboard 200 and went platinum.

Soundsystem was released in 1999, From Chaos was released in 2001, and Evolver was released in 2003; all three studio albums peaked in the top 10 of the Billboard 200. The band's 2004 compilation album Greatest Hits '93-'03 also peaked in the top 10. A single from Greatest Hits '93-'03, "Love Song", became 311's second single to top the Alternative Songs chart.

The band's next four studio albums, Don't Tread on Me (2005), Uplifter (2009), Universal Pulse (2011), and Stereolithic (2014), all peaked in the top 10 of the Billboard 200 as well. Uplifter went to number three, the highest chart position of any 311 album. The title track from Don't Tread on Me was released as a single and peaked at number two on the Alternative Songs chart.

== Albums ==
=== Studio albums ===
Title	Album details	Peak chart positions				Certifications
Title	Album details	US	US Alt.	US Heat.	AUS	Certifications
Music	Released: February 9, 1993; Label: Capricorn; Formats: CD, CS, LP, DI	—	—	37	—	RIAA: Gold
Grassroots	Released: July 12, 1994; Label: Capricorn; Formats: CD, CS, DI	193	—	8	—	RIAA: Gold
311	Released: July 11, 1995; Label: Capricorn; Formats: CD, CS, LP, DI	12	—	1	93	RIAA: 3× Platinum
Transistor	Released: August 5, 1997; Label: Capricorn; Formats: CD, CS, LP, DI	4	—	—	—	RIAA: Platinum
Soundsystem	Released: October 12, 1999; Label: Capricorn; Formats: CD, CS, LP, DI	9	—	—	—	RIAA: Gold
From Chaos	Released: June 19, 2001; Label: Volcano; Formats: CD, CS, LP, DI	10	—	—	—	RIAA: Gold
Evolver	Released: July 22, 2003; Label: Volcano; Formats: CD, DI	7	—	—	—	
Don't Tread on Me	Released: August 16, 2005; Label: Volcano; Formats: CD, LP, DI	5	—	—	—	
Uplifter	Released: June 2, 2009; Label: Volcano; Formats: CD, LP, DI	3	2	—	—	
Universal Pulse	Released: July 19, 2011; Label: 311, ATO; Formats: CD, LP, DI	7	2	—	—	
Stereolithic	Released: March 11, 2014; Label: 311 Records; Formats: CD, LP, DI	6	1	—	—	
Mosaic	Released: June 23, 2017; Label: BMG; Formats: CD, LP, DI	6	2	—	—	
Voyager	Released: July 12, 2019; Label: BMG; Formats: CD, LP, DI	18	2	—	—	
Full Bloom	Released: October 25, 2024; Label: SKP; Formats: CD, LP, DI	118	—	—	—	
"—" denotes a recording that did not chart or was not released in that territory.

=== Independent albums ===
Title	Album details
Dammit!	Released: 1990; Label: What Have You; Formats: CS
Unity	Released: 1991; Label: What Have You; Formats: CD, CS

=== Live albums ===
Title	Album details	Peak chart positions
Title	Album details	US
Live	Released: November 3, 1998; Label: Capricorn; Formats: CD, CS, DI	77
311 with the Unity Orchestra	Released: November 18, 2014; Label: 311 Records; Formats: CD, Vinyl, Digital	—
"—" denotes a recording that did not chart or was not released in that territory.

=== Compilation albums ===
Title	Album details	Peak chart positions	Certifications
Title	Album details	US	Certifications
Omaha Sessions	Released: October 1998; Label: What Have You; Formats: CD	—	
Flavors - American Singles	Released: September 27, 2000; Label: Capricorn; Formats: CD	—	
Greatest Hits '93-'03	Released: June 8, 2004; Label: Volcano; Formats: CD, DI	7	RIAA: Platinum
Playlist: The Very Best of 311	Released: 2010; Label: Volcano, Legacy; Formats: CD, DI	—	
Archive	Released: June 30, 2015; Label: Legacy; Formats: CD, DI	126	
The Essential 311	Released: May 6, 2016; Label: Legacy; Formats: CD, DI	—	
"—" denotes a recording that did not chart or was not released in that territory.

=== Video albums ===
Title	Album details	Certifications
Enlarged to Show Detail	Released: November 5, 1996; Label: Capricorn; Formats: VHS, DVD	RIAA: Platinum
Enlarged to Show Detail 2	Released: December 11, 2001; Label: Volcano; Formats: VHS, DVD	RIAA: Gold
311 Day: Live in New Orleans	Released: October 24, 2004; Label: Volcano; Formats: DVD	RIAA: Platinum
The Road to 311 Day 2008	Released: 2009; Label: Volcano; Formats: DVD	
311 Pow Wow Festival: Transistor Full Album Set: 08/06/11: Live Oaks, FL	Released: 2012; Label: Live311; Formats: DVD	
Charter One Pavilion at Northerly Island: Chicago, IL: 7/14/11	Released: 2012; Label: Live311; Formats: DVD	
Lifestyle Communities Pavilion: Columbus, OH: 8/8/2012	Released: 2012; Label: Live311; Formats: DVD	

== Extended plays ==
Title	EP details	Peak chart positions
Title	EP details	US
Downstairs (unreleased)	Released: 1989; Label: What Have You; Formats: CS	—
Hydroponic	Released: 1992; Label: 311 Records; Formats: CS, CD, LP	—
Enlarged to Show Detail	Released: November 5, 1996; Label: Capricorn; Formats: CD	95
Enlarged to Show Detail 2	Released: December 11, 2001; Label: Volcano; Formats: CD	—
"—" denotes a recording that did not chart or was not released in that territory.

== Singles ==
=== 1990s ===
Title	Year	Peak chart positions								Certifications	Album
Title	Year	US	US Alt.	US Main.	US Pop	US Rock	AUS	CAN	CAN Rock	Certifications	Album
"Freak Out"	1992	—	—	—	—	—	—	—	—		Music
"Do You Right"	1993	—	27	—	—	—	—	—	—		Music
"Visit"	1993	—	—	—	—	—	—	—	—		Music
"My Stoney Baby"	1993	—	—	—	—	—	—	—	—		Music
"Feels So Good"	1993	—	—	—	—	—	—	—	—		Music
"Homebrew"	1994	—	—	—	—	—	—	—	—		Grassroots
"Lucky"	1994	—	—	—	—	—	—	—	—		Grassroots
"8:16 a.m./Omaha Stylee"	1995	—	—	—	—	—	—	—	—		Grassroots
"Jackolantern's Weather/Guns"	1995	—	—	—	—	—	—	—	—		311
"Don't Stay Home"	1995	—	29	—	—	—	—	—	—		311
"Down"	1996	— (Note: "Down" did not enter the Billboard Hot 100, but peaked at number 37 on the Hot 100 Airplay chart.)	1	19	—	—	41	60	4	RIAA: Platinum	311
"All Mixed Up"	1996	— (Note: "All Mixed Up" did not enter the Billboard Hot 100, but peaked at number 36 on the Hot 100 Airplay chart.)	4	—	34	—	—	—	—	RIAA: Platinum	311
"Transistor"	1997	—	14	31	—	— (Note: "Transistor" did not enter the Hot Rock & Alternative Songs chart, but peaked at number 23 on the Active Rock chart.)	—	—	—		Transistor
"Prisoner"	1997	—	21	—	—	—	—	—	—		Transistor
"Beautiful Disaster"	1997	—	21	—	—	— (Note: "Beautiful Disaster" did not enter the Hot Rock & Alternative Songs chart, but peaked at number 35 on the Active Rock chart.)	—	—	—	RIAA: Platinum	Transistor
"Come Original"	1999	— (Note: "Come Original" did not enter the Billboard Hot 100, but peaked at number 19 on the Bubbling Under Hot 100 Singles chart.)	6	39	—	— (Note: "Come Original" did not enter the Hot Rock & Alternative Songs chart, but peaked at number 34 on the Active Rock chart.)	—	—	—		Soundsystem
"Flowing"	1999	—	17	—	—	—	—	—	—		Soundsystem
"—" denotes a recording that did not chart or was not released in that territory.

=== 2000s ===
Title	Year	Peak chart positions						Certifications	Album
Title	Year	US	US Alt.	US Main.	US Pop	US Rock	CAN Rock	Certifications	Album
"Large in the Margin"	2000	—	—	—	—	—	—		Soundsystem
"You Wouldn't Believe"	2001	— (Note: "You Wouldn't Believe" did not enter the Billboard Hot 100, but peaked at number 20 on the Bubbling Under Hot 100 Singles chart.)	7	32	—	— (Note: "You Wouldn't Believe" did not enter the Hot Rock & Alternative Songs chart, but peaked at number 25 on the Active Rock chart.)	—		From Chaos
"I'll Be Here Awhile"	2001	—	15	—	—	—	—		From Chaos
"Amber"	2002	— (Note: "Amber" did not enter the Billboard Hot 100, but peaked at number three on the Bubbling Under Hot 100 Singles chart.)	13	—	— (Note: "Amber" did not enter the Pop Airplay chart, but peaked at number 27 on the Adult Pop Airplay chart.)	— (Note: "Amber" did not enter the Hot Rock & Alternative Songs chart, but peaked at number 15 on the Adult Alternative Airplay chart.)	—	RIAA: 3× Platinum	From Chaos
"Creatures (For a While)"	2003	— (Note: "Creatures (For a While)" did not enter the Billboard Hot 100, but peaked at number 18 on the Bubbling Under Hot 100 Singles chart.)	3	—	—	—	—		Evolver
"Beyond the Gray Sky"	2004	—	39	—	—	—	—		Evolver
"Love Song"	2004	59	1	—	39	—	—	RIAA: Platinum	50 First Dates soundtrack Greatest Hits '93–'03
"First Straw"	2004	—	14	—	—	—	—		Greatest Hits '93–'03
"Don't Tread on Me"	2005	— (Note: "Don't Tread on Me" did not enter the Billboard Hot 100, but peaked at number seven on the Bubbling Under Hot 100 Singles chart.)	2	—	98	—	22		Don't Tread on Me
"Speak Easy"	2005	—	22	—	—	—	—		Don't Tread on Me
"Frolic Room"	2006	—	—	—	—	—	—		Don't Tread on Me
"Hey You"	2009	— (Note: "Hey You" did not enter the Billboard Hot 100, but peaked at number 94 on the Hot 100 Airplay chart.)	3	38	—	17	39		Uplifter
"It's Alright"	2009	—	16	—	—	38	—		Uplifter
"—" denotes a recording that did not chart or was not released in that territory.

=== 2010s ===
Title	Year	Peak chart positions					Album
Title	Year	US Alt.	US Main.	US Rock	CAN Rock	MEX	Album
"Sunset in July"	2011	7	36	21	43	28	Universal Pulse
"Count Me In"	2011	31	—	—	—	47	Universal Pulse
"Time Bomb"	2012	—	—	—	—	—	Universal Pulse
"Five of Everything"	2014	—	—	—	—	—	Stereolithic
"Too Much to Think"	2017	20	—	49	—	—	Mosaic
"'Til the City's On Fire"	2017	—	—	—	—	—	Mosaic
"Good Feeling"	2019	35	—	—	—	—	Voyager
"Don't You Worry"	2019	—	—	—	—	—	Voyager
"—" denotes a recording that did not chart or was not released in that territory.

=== 2020s ===
Title	Year	Peak chart positions			Album
Title	Year	US Alt.	US Main.	US Air	Album
"You're Gonna Get It"	2024	17	39	45	Full Bloom
"Need Somebody"	2024	—	—	—	Full Bloom

== Music videos ==
List of music videos, showing year released and directors
Title	Year	Director(s)
"Do You Right"	1993	Joe Charbanic
"Homebrew"	1994	Dante Ariola, Anthony Artiaga, and Jay Papke
"Don't Stay Home"	1995	Mark Kohr
"Down"	1996	Josh Taft
"All Mixed Up"	1996	Dante Ariola and Jay Papke
"Transistor"	1997	Jay Papke
"Prisoner"	1997	Dante Ariola and Jay Papke
"Beautiful Disaster"	1997	Carter B. Smith
"Come Original"	1999	Kevin Kerslake
"Flowing"	2000	Marcos Siega
"You Wouldn't Believe"	2001	Mark Kohr
"I'll Be Here Awhile"	2001	If/Then
"Amber"	2002	The Malloys
"Creatures (For a While)"	2003	The Malloys
"Love Song"	2004	Mark Kohr
"First Straw"	2004	
"Don't Tread on Me"	2005	Colourmovie
"Hey You"	2009	Joe Lynch
"Sunset in July"	2011	
"Weightless"	2011	Matt Boda
"Wild Nights"	2011	SA Martinez
"Trouble"	2011	Shawn Harris
"And a Ways to Go"	2011	Matt Boda
"Five of Everything"	2014	Brian Bowen Smith
"Make It Rough"	2014	P-Nut
"Sand Dollars"	2014	Streethearted Videos
"Too Much to Think"	2017	Rich Ragsdale
"Til the City's on Fire"	2017	BWA (Brand Wagon Agency)
"You're Gonna Get It"	2024	Brian Bowen Smith
"Full Bloom"	2024	Matt Boda
