= Archive (311 album) =

Box set by 311
- Released: June 29, 2015
- Recorded: 1992—2014
- Length: 4:18:15
- Labels: Sony Music; Volcano
- Producers: Bob Rock; Eddy Offord; Chad Sexton; Hugh Padgham; Tom Burleigh; Scott Ralston; Ron Saint Germain

311 chronology
Stereolithic (2014)	Archive (2015)	Mosaic (2017)

Archive is a box set of mostly previously unissued recordings recorded between 1992 and 2014 by the American rock band 311, released on June 29, 2015.

== Background and contents ==
Archive was released to celebrate 311's 25th anniversary. It contains 81 tracks spanning four discs, including the track "Cali Soca", recorded during the Soundsystem sessions. Nick Hexum said of the release: "Yeah, I think it's our entire major label career. There's nothing from this current last album because there were no B-sides, we put everything out. This goes all the way back to Music's B-sides, our first major label album. It's pretty much the whole scope of our career. There are a couple of odds and ends from the very early days before we were signed that weren't included.", he also said he hadn't heard some of the recordings in a long time. The album cover features a honeycomb design that was also available on patches that were purchasable through a url. The liner notes of the set states: "We felt that we didn't really need another 'Greatest Hits' compilation so we started searching for things we knew a true 311 fan would like to hear and see. While searching, it became clear that we were going to dive deep into the archives and uncover material that no one outside the band had ever laid eyes or ears on. It is our sincere hope that you will love this collection as much as we loved making it."

== Critical reception ==
Professional ratings
Review scores
Source	Rating
AllMusic	3.5/5 stars

Senior AllMusic critic Stephen Thomas Erlewine states that "It goes without saying that [Archive] is one for the fans -- specifically fans of the dedicated sort, of which there are many", noting that "The version that hit standard retail, both physical and digital, is divided into four parts: a disc of B-sides and bonus tracks, a disc of outtakes, a disc of largely "pre-production" recordings, and a disc of demos.", concluding by stating that "It's interesting and, elsewhere, there are enough strong stray songs and larks to make this worth the time of serious fans."

== Track listing ==
Disc one: B-Sides & Bonus Tracks
No.	Title	Length
1.	"Transistor Intro" (originally included as a hidden track as track 0 on Transistor (1997))	1:41
2.	"Let the Cards Fall" (originally included on a bonus extended play released with Enlarged to Show Detail (1996))	3:29
3.	"Outside" (originally included on the soundtrack of National Lampoon's Senior Trip (1995))	1:57
4.	"Gap" (originally included on a bonus extended play released with Enlarged to Show Detail (1996))	2:11
5.	"Tribute" (originally included on a bonus extended play released with Enlarged to Show Detail (1996))	4:18
6.	"Firewater Slo-Mo" (originally included on a bonus extended play released with Enlarged to Show Detail (1996))	3:55
7.	"Blizza" (previously unreleased in the United States, but released as a Japanese bonus track on Soundsystem (1999))	1:21
8.	"Dancehall" (originally included on a bonus extended play released with Enlarged to Show Detail 2 (2001))	2:52
9.	"Bomb the Town" (originally included on a bonus extended play released with Enlarged to Show Detail 2)	4:15
10.	"Will the World" (originally included on a bonus extended play released with Enlarged to Show Detail 2)	1:06
11.	"We Do It Like This" (originally included on a bonus extended play released with Enlarged to Show Detail 2)	2:46
12.	"Dreamland" (originally included on a bonus extended play released with Enlarged to Show Detail 2)	1:13
13.	"What Do You Do" (previously unreleased in the United States, but released as a Japanese bonus track on Evolver (2003))	2:40
14.	"Little Brother" (previously unreleased in the United States, but released as a Japanese bonus track on Don't Tread on Me (2005))	3:32
15.	"I Like the Way" (originally released on the deluxe edition of Uplifter (2009))	4:00
16.	"Get Down" (originally released on the deluxe edition of Uplifter (2009))	5:05
17.	"How Long Has it Been" (Originally released on the iTunes edition of Uplifter (2009))	3:15
18.	"Sun Come Through" (originally released on the Amazon edition of Uplifter (2009))	3:27
19.	"Vape'n Away" (originally released on the exclusive 311 Day edition of Stereolithic)	4:52

Disc two: Unreleased songs
No.	Title	Recording during sessions for	Length
1.	"Summer of Love" (unreleased version, recorded in 1994)		5:27
2.	"Juan Bond"	311 (1995)	2:51
3.	"Firewater" (normal speed)	311	3:18
4.	"Next"	311	1:43
5.	"Grifter"	Transistor (1997)	2:52
6.	"Writer's Block Party"	Transistor	2:54
7.	"Earth People"	Transistor	2:20
8.	"The Quickening"	Transistor	2:23
9.	"Everything"	Transistor	1:46
10.	"Old Funk"	Transistor	2:39
11.	"Space Funk"	Transistor	2:33
12.	"Lemming"	Transistor	4:06
13.	"Cali Soca"	Soundsystem (1999)	3:38
14.	"Seal the Deal"	Soundsystem	3:20
15.	"Who's Got the Herb" (Unreleased version, recorded in 2001)		3:43
16.	"Time is Precious"	Evolver (2003)	3:05
17.	"Into the Flame"	Don't Tread on Me (2005)	2:42
18.	"Stealing My Girl"	Don't Tread on Me	3:00
19.	"Week of Saturdays"	Uplifter (2009)	3:19
20.	"Simplify"	Uplifter	5:16

Disc three: Pre-Production Recordings & Demos (note: tracks after track 16 are demos)
No.	Title	Length
1.	"Welcome"	3:02
2.	"Visit"	3:39
3.	"Feels So Good"	3:17
4.	"Paradise"	5:15
5.	"Homebrew"	2:59
6.	"Offbeat Bare-Ass"	3:45
7.	"Six"	3:20
8.	"Lose"	4;15
9.	"Come Original"	3:07
10.	"Freeze Time"	3:24
11.	"Flowing"	3:14
12.	"Livin' & Rockin'"	2:35
13.	"Full Ride"	3:11
14.	"Champagne"	3:03
15.	"Sick Tight"	3:47
16.	"How Do You Feel"	3:09
17.	"Down" (demo)	2:11
18.	"Let the Cards Fall" (demo)	1:56
19.	"Random" (demo)	2:46
20.	"The Continuous Life" (demo)	4:07

Disc four: Demos continued
No.	Title	Length
1.	"Color"	1:54
2.	"Starshines"	2:28
3.	"Inner Light Spectrum"	4:44
4.	"Stealing Happy Hours"	4:18
5.	"Pass The Grass" (early demo version of "Strong All Along")	1:34
6.	"Forward" (early demo version of "Large in the Margin")	2:58
7.	"Mindspin"	3:50
8.	"Stop Dat" (early demo version of "Eons")	3:42
9.	"Kill" (early demo version of "Can't Fade Me")	1:49
10.	"Sick Tight"	3:07
11.	"From Chaos"	2:57
12.	"I Told Myself"	3:09
13.	"You Wouldn't Believe"	3:30
14.	"I'll Be Here Awhile"	3:22
15.	"Seems Uncertain"	2:03
16.	"Give Me a Call"	3:20
17.	"Romantic Odyssey" (early demo version of "Speak Easy")	3:22
18.	"Rockin Aught8" (early demo version of "Sun Come Through")	3:56
19.	"New Thingy" (early demo version of "Jackpot")	4:56
20.	"Rock on Circus" (early demo version of "Rock On")	3:08
21.	"Go!" (early demo version of "Ebb and Flow")	3:50
22.	"Paradise" (acoustic demo version)	4:51

== Charts ==
Chart performance for Archive
Chart (2015)	Peak position
US Billboard 200	126
