= Greatest Hits '93–'03 =

Greatest hits album by 311
- Released: June 8, 2004
- Recorded: 1993–2003
- Length: 58:57
- Label: Volcano
- Producers: 311, Ron Saint Germain, Scotch Ralston, Eddy Offord, Hugh Padgham, David Kahne

311 chronology
Evolver (2003)	Greatest Hits '93–'03 (2004)	Don't Tread on Me (2005)

Singles from Greatest Hits '93-'03
- 1. "Love Song" Released: February 13, 2004; 2. "First Straw" Released: 2004

Professional ratings
Review scores
Source	Rating
AllMusic	4/5 stars
The Rolling Stone Album Guide	3/5 stars

Greatest Hits '93–'03 is the first compilation album by 311. It was released on June 8, 2004, on Volcano Entertainment.

== Track listing ==
No.	Title	Lyrics	Music	Producer(s)	Length
1.	"Down" (from 311, 1995)	Nick Hexum; Doug Martinez	Hexum	Ron Saint Germain; 311	2:51
2.	"Flowing" (from Soundsystem, 1999)	Hexum	Hexum	Hugh Padgham; Scotch Ralston; 311	3:10
3.	"All Mixed Up" (from 311)	Hexum; Martinez	Hexum	Saint Germain; 311	2:59
4.	"Amber" (from From Chaos, 2001)	Hexum	Hexum	Saint Germain; 311	3:27
5.	"Come Original" (from Soundsystem)	Hexum; Martinez	Hexum; Aaron Wills	Padgham; Ralston; 311	3:39
6.	"Beautiful Disaster" (from Transistor, 1997)	Hexum	Hexum	Ralston; 311	3:58
7.	"Creatures (For a While)" (from Evolver, 2003)	Hexum; Martinez	Hexum; Tim Mahoney	Saint Germain; 311	4:23
8.	"Do You Right" (from Music, 1993)	Hexum; Martinez	Hexum; Chad Sexton	Eddy Offord	4:17
9.	"I'll Be Here Awhile" (from From Chaos)	Hexum; Martinez	Hexum; Martinez	Saint Germain; 311	3:26
10.	"You Wouldn't Believe" (from From Chaos)	Hexum; Martinez	Hexum	Saint Germain; 311	3:41
11.	"Transistor" (from Transistor)	Hexum; Martinez	Sexton	Ralston; 311	3:01
12.	"Don't Stay Home" (from 311)	Hexum	Hexum	Saint Germain; 311	2:42
13.	"Homebrew" (from Grassroots, 1994)	Hexum; Martinez	Hexum; Mahoney; Sexton; Wills	Offord; 311	3:03
14.	"Beyond the Gray Sky" (from Evolver)	Hexum; Martinez	Mahoney	Saint Germain; 311	4:14
15.	"Love Song" (cover of The Cure, from the 50 First Dates soundtrack)	Simon Gallup; Roger O'Donnell; Robert Smith; Porl Thompson; Lol Tolhurst; Boris Williams	Gallup; O'Donnell; Smith; Thompson; Tolhurst; Williams	311	3:26
16.	"How Do You Feel?" (previously unreleased)	Hexum; Martinez	Hexum; Sexton	David Kahne; 311	3:02
17.	"First Straw" (previously unreleased)	Hexum; Martinez	Hexum	Kahne; 311	2:57

== Personnel ==
311

- Nick Hexum – vocals, guitar
- SA Martinez – vocals, DJ
- Chad Sexton – drums
- Tim Mahoney – guitar
- P-Nut – bass

Technical personnel

- Joe Gastwirt – mixing (13), mastering
- David Kahne – mixing (16, 17)
- Eddy Offord – mixing (8)
- Jack Joseph Puig – mixing (15)
- Scotch Ralston – mixing (1–3, 5, 6, 11, 12)
- Ron Saint Germain – mixing (1, 3, 4, 7, 9, 10, 12, 14)
- Chad Sexton – mixing (13)

== Chart performance ==
Chart (2004)	Peak position
US Billboard 200	7

== Certifications ==
Region	Certification	Certified units/sales
United States (RIAA)	Platinum	1,000,000^{‡}
^{‡} Sales+streaming figures based on certification alone.
