= The Hive (recording studio) =

US-American recording studio in North Hollywood, California

Coordinates: 34.170123°N 118.361187°W

The Hive is a recording studio in North Hollywood, Los Angeles at 5500 Cahuenga Blvd, it is owned and run by the members of the alternative rock band 311.

== History ==
In 2000, after finishing touring for Soundsystem, the five members of 311 grew distraught with having to pay upwards of $2,000 a day in professional recording studios. Seeking a more independent-style place to work, they found a place in North Hollywood where they could record and pay rent of $3,000 a month. The band soon loaded in two 24 track analog tape machines and Pro Tools technology, fully furnished the place, and began working on their next album.

In 2022, the band listed the studio for sale on LoopNet, due to it becoming stale, but delisted it in 2023, just in time to write and record for 2024's Full Bloom.

== Recordings captured at the Hive ==
Prior to 311 purchasing the Hive, it was actively used as a music studio in the 1970s and 1980s. Notable acts such as Missing Persons and Adam Ant have recorded there. Just before 311 started using it, it was used as a voice-over studio for movies.

Since 311 moved into the studio, they have recorded and mixed nine albums at the Hive; 2001's From Chaos, 2003's Evolver, 2005's Don't Tread on Me, 2009's Uplifter, 2011's Universal Pulse, 2014's Stereolithic, 2017's Mosaic, 2019's Voyager, and 2024's Full Bloom. The band worked with producer Ron Saint Germain on From Chaos, Evolver, and Don't Tread on Me, while Bob Rock produced Uplifter and Universal Pulse, and Scotch Ralston produced Stereolithic, making it the first time since 1999's Soundsystem that he produced a 311 album. Scotch Ralston has also split produced Mosaic and Voyager, along with a few tracks on Full Bloom.

311 started mixing and mastering official live recordings with Scotch Ralston in 2011 at the studio for their live bootleg website live.311.com. The website has been defunct for years now, but the library has since moved to nugs.net, where the band livestreamed concerts from 2018 to 2023, but has since moved to veeps.com.

On February 4, 2014, 311 released their single "Five of Everything" from their 11th studio album Stereolithic. On February 19, a music video was released for the single, which featured the band performing the song live in the Hive recording studio.

After a canceled US tour with Incubus (Due to the COVID-19 pandemic), 311 didn't want to waste their 30th anniversary, so using the time off from touring, they created their own livestreaming service called "Streamsystem" (a creative play on "Soundsystem"), where they would go live from the live room at the Hive, playing through their first six albums in their entirety. Halfway through 2020, the band's crew renovated the studio's live room, to equip the studio with high quality cameras, video projecters, and livestreaming equipment to prepare it for the upcoming album streams. The band was scheduled to livestream their three full album concerts over a one stream per month basis, with each album to be played in chronological order. Music was scheduled for November 11, Grassroots for December 11, and the self-titled album for January 11. Later streams were added out of success of the first three, with Transistor on March 11 (311 Day), Soundsystem on April 16, and From Chaos on May 14.

During the From Chaos album livestream on May 14, the band announced their "Live From the Ride" with Iration and Iya Terra for the summer of 2021. Alongside this announcement, it was revealed that Streamsystem would be coming to tour, and 10 select shows from the tour would be livestreamed on their website. In 2022, 311 would use the streaming service for the final time, and livestream six shows from their 2022 fall tour with Tropedellic. Headlining two nights in New York City, Chicago, and Los Angeles, the band played their first six albums in their entirety again, along with popular hits and deep cuts, this time live in a real concert. New York City heard Music & Grassroots, Chicago heard the self-titled album & Transistor, and Los Angeles heard Soundsystem and From Chaos.

To this day, 311 still continues to use the Hive for writing, recording, and rehearsing for tours, despite most members having their own home studios, the Hive is a significant "home-like" place for the band and the crew to record and create exclusively to their own extent.

== Photo & Video ==
2009 promotional skit featuring record producer Bob Rock https://youtube/JcZ-9awDets?si=X7JHqCjkIzu1oGwP

Five of Everything music video (Currently missing from YouTube due to a licensing issue)

Behind the scenes of 2014's Stereolithic https://youtube.com/playlist?list=PLBLuqik5bI5BZ3tZoYXPkI6T1UaQhTl0a&si=2GdlnLX7lklQEpL2

Behind the scenes of 2017's Mosaic https://youtube.com/playlist?list=PLxIa-9spucdOjPvzEUJb9rYrfd4fOS44z&si=Mt3UZTtvlBd-Cc5z

Behind the scenes of 2019's Voyager https://youtube.com/playlist?list=PLBLuqik5bI5A-lY4opr49S86ANdtH3WEo&si=sVldmqNbjtI2F5pr

Behind the scenes of 2024's Full Bloom https://www.instagram.com/311/reel/CwqHMWFJ1YQ/
