= Transistor (disambiguation) =

A transistor is a semiconductor device used to amplify and switch electronic signals and electrical power.

Transistor may also refer to:

== Music ==
- Transistor (311 album), 1997
  - "Transistor" (song), the title track by the band 311 from the album Transistor
- Transistor (TNT album)
- "Transistor", a song by Kraftwerk from the 1975 album Radio-Activity
- "Twisted Transistor", a song by Korn
- Transister, band

== Other uses ==
- Transistor (video game), a 2014 video game by Supergiant Games

== See also ==
- Transistor radio, a small portable radio receiver using transistor-based circuitry
