= Don't Tread on Me (311 song) =

Single by 311

from the album Don't Tread on Me
- Released: July 25, 2005
- Length: 3:06
- Label: Volcano Records
- Songwriters: Nick Hexum, SA Martinez, Aaron "P-Nut" Wills
- Producers: Ron Saint Germain, 311

311 singles chronology
"First Straw" (2004)	"Don't Tread on Me" (2005)	"Speak Easy" (2005)

Music video
- "Don't Tread on Me" on YouTube

"Don't Tread on Me" is a single by the group 311, the first released from their eighth studio album of the same name. The single, an original composition written by the band's members, was released in 2005. It became their seventh top-five hit on the Billboard Alternative chart.

== Charts ==
=== Weekly charts ===
Weekly chart performance for "Don't Tread on Me"
Chart (2005)	Peak position
Canada Rock Top 30 (Radio & Records)	22
US Bubbling Under Hot 100 (Billboard)	7
US Alternative Airplay (Billboard)	2

=== Year-end charts ===
Year-end chart performance for "Don't Tread on Me"
Chart (2005)	Position
US Modern Rock Tracks (Billboard)	21

== Release history ==
Release dates and formats for "Don't Tread on Me"
Region	Date	Format	Label(s)	Ref.
United States	September 20, 2005	Mainstream airplay	Jive; Zomba	
