= Stereolithic =

Studio album by 311
- Released: March 11, 2014
- Recorded: August – November 2013
- Studio: The Hive (North Hollywood, California)
- Genres: Rap rock; reggae
- Length: 58:00
- Label: 311
- Producer: Scott Ralston

311 studio album chronology
Universal Pulse (2011)	Stereolithic (2014)	Archive (2015)

Singles from Stereolithic
- 1. "Five of Everything" Released: February 4, 2014; 2. "Showdown" Released: March 2, 2014; 3. "Make it Rough" Released: March 6, 2014

Stereolithic (stylized as STER30L1TH1C) is the eleventh studio album by the American rock band 311, released on March 11, 2014. It is the band's first fully independent studio album release since 1991's Unity. Stereolithic is also 311's first album since 1999's Soundsystem to be produced by Scotch Ralston, making this their first album since 2005's Don't Tread on Me not to be produced by Bob Rock.

== Background ==
When asked about why the band was leaving the major labels in the music industry, band leader Nick Hexum said that "the label system is corrupt; they're so incompetent with their ability to bring any value to the table. It's just a rip-off." After declaring themselves as an independent artist, 311 reunited with producer of Transistor and Soundsystem, Scott "Scotch" Ralston, to produce this Stereolithic. "We asked him to come back and run sound for us, and it really improved our live sound," Hexum explains. "The fans noticed that. Because he did the Transistor album, which is kind of our most beloved fan favorite because it's so eclectic and everything, there was a lot of excitement from the fans about that kind of creativity coming back in with him. So we started talking about new songs and he had so many ideas and just so much enthusiasm that it was like a steamroller of excitement. So we had to say yes to having him produce us. It turned out to be a great decision."

The band built up suspense for the album's release via Twitter by presetting the release date to be March 11, 2014 (3-11 Day) over 200 days in advance. During the songwriting process, P-Nut informed Hear Magazine that the new album had "darker themes, even lyrically." To explain, he said "I think even more people will relate to this album. The positive thing is tough for a lot of people to swallow, for whatever reason. That is who we are, but I don’t know, it’s nice to kind of admit that in the world we live in, it’s pretty difficult for some people. It’s an endless source of both inspiration and frustration, so why not make music out of it? I’ve always felt that, at least in demo form, our music is darker than the philosophy behind the lyrics that can end up in the final product. I think my job in the room when we’re writing is to help shape that."

With some additional interviews, fans received some descriptions of the innovative new sound the band was working on. "There are a lot of great rock riffs and Chad keeps mentioning that he wants it to be danceable, so that's what he's going for in his drum parts," Hexum said in an interview with Fuse. "There are a lot of harmonies and more rapping than there was on the previous record because that's what the riffs called for. There's definitely some retro-sounding moments, too." The same article also described "crazy epic" dual-sweep arpeggio guitars that brought the band's experimentalism to a brand new level. Hexum also told Billboard magazine that "There’s a lot of riffs and really good high-energy stuff that’s going to be great for a live setting. I think there’s a good diversity of tempos and feels and arrangements, lots of distortion guitar and big rocking parts but then there’s some trippy, chill-out moments and even some hard rock, like dual leads that some might say could sound like some old classic rock."

== Promotion ==
For the first time, the band utilized a promotion website to not only sell the album, but special merchandise as well. Through PledgeMusic, 311 made pre-ordering available on January 13. Those who pledged to buy any combination of CDs, vinyl and posters (some autographed) were put into a drawing to win a variety of prizes which include: Concert tickets, backstage passes, media photo passes, custom guitar picks from Nick and Tim, a pair of custom Vater drumsticks used by Chad Sexton during recording, GHS bass strings used by P-Nut during recording, a band-autographed drum head, hand-written lyrics by Nick and S.A. from a song of the winner's choice, a live Skype call from P-Nut, and as the grand prize, Tim Mahoney's autographed Paul Reed Smith SE guitar.

=== Singles ===
Stereolithic's first single, "Five of Everything", was released on February 4, 2014. Regarding the song, Hexum stated "It's innovative and interesting and cool so I'm just excited for the world to hear it." On February 19, a music video for the song premiered on Yahoo! Music.

== Reception ==
Professional ratings
Aggregate scores
Source	Rating
Metacritic	61/100
Review scores
Source	Rating
ABC News	3/5 stars
AllMusic	3.5/5 stars
Consequence of Sound	C−
Entertainment Weekly	B−
Glide Magazine	5/10 stars
Omaha World-Herald	2/4 stars
PopMatters	7/10 stars
Rolling Stone	2.5/5 stars

According to the review aggregator Metacritic, Stereolithic received "generally favorable reviews" based on a weighted average score of 61 out of 100 from four critic scores. Allen Raible at ABC News describes it as perhaps their best album since their self-titled album, 311, stating "In spite of a few small missteps, Stereolithic stands as a reminder of what 311 do at their best." Matt Collar of AllMusic described the album as "a mature, sophisticated album that's made the group more than worthy of our time than ever before." Patrick Flanary from Glide Magazine stated "Much of the album is dull familiarity, a retread rife with expected song structures, indulgent effects, and silly studio chatter." Although, they praised songs like "Showdown", "Simple True" and "Tranquility". Omaha World-Herald's Kevin Coffey states that "The record also suffers from a bad mix that downplays the band's strong musical abilities in order to bring the vocals out front to make this rock band sound like a pop project", also noting that there's much to enjoy. From PopMatters, Kevin Catchpole discusses the album's darker themes, saying "In a twist that is expected from a band like 311, they turn their lyrical focus to themes of confusion and uncertainty, mixed with the struggle to overcome. They even manage a somewhat forced-sounding combo of "ode to simpler times + rant against climate change". This and other left turns can come off as a bit jarring, but they are just a handful of glitches on an album that is otherwise well done end to end." Catchpole conclude the review by calling the songs "a fine batch".

== Commercial performance ==
The album debuted at No. 6 on the Billboard 200 with first week sales of 41,000. This marks the band's 8th consecutive top 10 debut.

== Track listing ==
No.	Title	Writer(s)	Length
1.	"Ebb and Flow"	Nick Hexum; Doug "SA" Martinez; Chad Sexton; Aaron "P-Nut" Wills; Scott "Scotch" Ralston	3:24
2.	"Five of Everything"	Hexum; Martinez; Ralston	3:51
3.	"Showdown"	Hexum; Martinez; Ralston	3:48
4.	"Revelation of the Year"	Hexum; Martinez; Tim Mahoney; Ralston	4:11
5.	"Sand Dollars"	Hexum; Ralston	3:19
6.	"Boom Shanka"	Hexum; Martinez; Wills; Ralston	3:05
7.	"Make It Rough"	Hexum; Martinez	3:22
8.	"The Great Divide"	Hexum; Martinez; Sexton; Wills; Ralston	4:05
9.	"Friday Afternoon"	Hexum; Gabe Isaac	4:12
10.	"Simple True"	Hexum; Martinez; Wills; Ralston	4:12
11.	"First Dimension"	Hexum; Martinez; Sexton; Wills; Ralston	3:22
12.	"Made in the Shade"	Hexum; Sexton; Wills; Ralston	3:23
13.	"Existential Hero"	Hexum; Martinez; Sexton; Wills; Ralston	4:00
14.	"The Call"	Hexum; Martinez; Tim Pagnotta; Ralston	3:27
15.	"Tranquility"	Hexum	3:48
16.	"Untitled hidden track" (instrumental)		2:31
Total length:			58:00

Special Limited 311 Day Edition (Sold at a pre-311 Day 2014 event in New Orleans, LA)
No.	Title	Writer(s)	Length
16.	"Vape'n Away" (instrumental; later included on the Archive compilation)	Mahoney	4:54*
17.	"Boom Shanky Transmission" (Ralston Remix)		2:31
18.	"Sand Dollars" (Skins Remix)		3:58
19.	"Made in the Shade Voyager" (Ralston Remix)		3:22
20.	"Untitled hidden Track" (instrumental; track 16 on standard album version)		2:31
Total length:			72:45

Exclusive downloadable track for Pledgemusic.com orders
No.	Title	Length
17.	"Boom Shanky Transmission" (Ralston Remix)	2:31
Total length:		60:31

== Personnel ==
Credits adapted from album’s liner notes.

311

- Nick Hexum – vocals (lead vocals on all tracks except the untitled hidden track and "Vape'n Away"), guitar, keyboards (uncredited)
- Doug "SA" Martinez – vocals (lead vocals on all tracks except "Sand Dollars," "Friday Afternoon," "Made in the Shade," "Tranquility," and the untitled hidden track)
- Tim Mahoney – guitar
- P-Nut – bass
- Chad Sexton – drums, mixing

Production

- Scotch Ralston – producer, engineer, mixing
- Giff Tripp – assistant engineer
- Joe Gastwirt – mastering
