= Too Much to Think =

Single by 311

from the album Mosaic
- Released: March 11, 2017
- Length: 3:54
- Label: BMG
- Songwriters: Zakk Cervini, John Feldmann, Nick Hexum, Matthew Pauling
- Producer: John Feldmann

311 singles chronology
"Make it Rough" (2014)	"Too Much to Think" (2017)	"Self Esteem" (2018)

Music video
- "Too Much to Think" on YouTube

"Too Much to Think" is a song by American rock band 311. It is the first single from their twelfth studio album, Mosaic. It was released on March 11, 2017.

== Music video ==
The music video for the track was directed by Rich Ragsdale and filmed at Vasquez Rocks, located outside out of Los Angeles. The clip sees a group of friends traveling around the area in their car, before getting off and exploring. The friends then lay down in a circle, while one of them delves into acts of shamanism, which includes placing healing crystals on top of each person. The friends then awake from their trances and go into an altered mind state. The main friend who was behind the shamanistic ritual is seen at the end of the video, achieving a higher level of plane as the video fades to white. Shots of the band are interposed throughout the video.

== Charts ==
Chart (2017)	Peak position
US Alternative Airplay (Billboard)	20
