= Universal Pulse =

Studio album by 311
- Released: July 19, 2011
- Recorded: 2010–2011
- Studio: The Hive (North Hollywood, California)
- Genre: Reggae rock
- Length: 28:55
- Label: 311, ATO
- Producer: Bob Rock

311 chronology
Uplifter (2009)	Universal Pulse (2011)	Stereolithic (2014)

Singles from Universal Pulse
- 1. "Sunset in July" Released: June 3, 2011; 2. "Time Bomb" Released: July 11, 2011; 3. "Count Me In" Released: October 4, 2011

Universal Pulse is the tenth studio album by American rock band 311. It was released on July 19, 2011 on 311 Records/ATO Records. their first release on their own independent record company.

== Album information ==
Like its predecessor, Uplifter, this album was produced by Bob Rock. Unlike previous albums where their record label requested that the drums be recorded at an alternate location, all tracks, including the drums, were recorded at the Hive Studio. To support the album, 311 invited Sublime with Rome to co-headline the 2011 Unity Tour, with special guests DJ Soulman and DJ Trichrome. The artwork was done by Sonny Kay. With only eight songs and clocking within less than thirty minutes, it's their shortest album to date.

The album's first single "Sunset in July" was released on June 3, 2011. The album's second single "Count Me In" was released on October 4, 2011.

== Reception ==
Professional ratings
Aggregate scores
Source	Rating
Metacritic	57/100
Review scores
Source	Rating
AllMusic	2.5/5 stars
Consequence of Sound	3.5/5 stars
Entertainment Weekly	(B−)
IGN	7.5/10 stars
PopMatters	6/10 stars
Rolling Stone	2/5 stars
Sputnikmusic	2.5/5

According to the review aggregator Metacritic, Universal Pulse received "mixed or average reviews" based on a weighted average score of 57 out of 100 from six critic scores. AllMusic editor Stephen Thomas Erlewine gave Universal Pulse a 2.5/5, commenting "Within the sharp relief of Bob Rock's immaculate production, this can mean that the fuzz-toned guitars and crunching riffs are strenuously underlined: they are the foundation of this unusually rock-oriented 311 album yet in this crystal-clear atmosphere they drill, not pummel." Erlewine concludes that "Universal Pulse can be wearying even at its half-hour length." Consequence of Sound gave the album a 3.5/5 and declares that it's the band's best album since From Chaos, saying "Once this album has completed its first full rotation, there’s an immediate urge to play it again. It’s short, sweet, and a perfect follow-up to where the band was in 2009."

== Track listing ==
No.	Title	Lyrics	Music	Length
1.	"Time Bomb"	Nick Hexum; Doug "SA" Martinez; Aaron "P-Nut" Wills	Hexum; Tim Mahoney	3:16
2.	"Wild Nights"	Hexum; Martinez	Chad Sexton; Hexum	3:38
3.	"Sunset in July"	Hexum; Martinez; Wills	Hexum; Sexton	3:56
4.	"Trouble"	Hexum	Hexum	3:32
5.	"Count Me In"	Hexum; Martinez	Hexum	3:27
6.	"Rock On"	Hexum; Martinez	Sexton	3:29
7.	"Weightless"	Hexum; Martinez	Hexum	3:19
8.	"And a Ways to Go"	Martinez; Hexum	Hexum; Wills	4:18
Total length:				28:55

== Charts ==
Charts	Peak position
U.S. Billboard 200	7
U.S. Billboard Rock Albums	2
U.S. Billboard Digital Albums	4
U.S. Billboard Independent Albums	1
U.S. Billboard Alternative Albums	2
U.S. Billboard Tastemaker Albums	1

== Personnel ==
Credits are adapted from album’s liner notes.

311

- Nick Hexum – vocals (lead vocals on all tracks), guitar
- Doug "SA" Martinez – vocals (lead vocals on 1–3, 5–8)
- Tim Mahoney – lead guitar
- P-Nut – bass
- Chad Sexton – drums, mixing

Production

- Bob Rock – producer, engineer
- Giff Tripp – engineer
- Joe Gastwirt – mastering
- Jason Walters – studio manager
