= You're Gonna Get It =

Single by 311

from the album Full Bloom
- Released: June 7, 2024
- Length: 2:50
- Label: SKP
- Songwriters: Colin Brittain; Doug Martinez; Nick Hexum; Elijah Noll
- Producer: Brittain

311 singles chronology
"Don't You Worry" (2019)	"You're Gonna Get It" (2024)	"Need Somebody" (2024)

Music video
- "You're Gonna Get It" on YouTube

"You're Gonna Get It" is a song by the American rock band 311, released as the lead single from their 2024 album Full Bloom. It is reportedly the band's highest-charting single since 2011's "Sunset in July", which peaked at number 7 on Billboard's Alternative Airplay (formerly Alternative Songs) chart.

== Composition and lyrics ==
"You're Gonna Get It" includes "eerie guitar picking" played by Tim Mahoney. According to Hexum, the track is about "going back into the mindset of when we were young, and dumb and doing a lot of crazy stuff", adding: "Sometimes getting away with it, sometimes with consequences. And I'm going in and out of the first person saying to myself, 'get your stuff together! Or else you're gonna get it.'"

== Reception ==
Music review website Chorus.fm wrote in their review of Full Bloom that the track "feels super-charged and creates the right type of anticipation for the material that follows".

== Music video ==
The track's music video, directed by Brian Bowen Smith, shows Nick Hexum as an underground boxer, fighting various opponents.

== Credits and personnel ==
Production credits adapted from Apple Music: Personnel adapted from the album's liner notes:

- Nick Hexum – vocals, guitar
- SA Martinez – vocals
- Chad Sexton – drums
- Tim Mahoney – guitar
- P-Nut – bass
- Emerson Mancini – mastering engineer
- Colin Brittain – producer

== Charts ==
Chart performance for You're Gonna Get It
Chart (2024)	Peak position
US Alternative Airplay (Billboard)	17
US Mainstream Rock (Billboard)	39
US Rock & Alternative Airplay (Billboard)	45
