= Count Me In (311 song) =

Single by 311

from the album Universal Pulse
- Released: 4 October 2011
- Length: 3:24
- Label: 311 Records; ATO Records
- Songwriters: Nick Hexum, SA Martinez
- Producer: Bob Rock

311 singles chronology
| "Sunset in July" (2011) | "Count Me In" (2011) | "Time Bomb" (2012) |

"Count Me In" is a song by American rock band 311. It is the second single from their tenth studio album, Universal Pulse. The single is a radio-only single and it was released on October 4, 2011.

== Reception ==
CultureBully calls the song "another stellar 311 track". Boston.com praises Tim Mahoney's guitar work in the song, saying he "creates some bright spots when freed up to mess with the tones and textures".

== Charts ==
| Chart (2011) | Peak position |
|---|---|
| US Alternative Airplay (Billboard) | 31 |
