= Voyager (311 album) =

Studio album by 311
- Released: July 12, 2019
- Studios: The Hive, North Hollywood, California
- Genres: Alternative rock; rap rock; reggae rock
- Length: 44:05
- Label: BMG
- Producers: Scotch Ralston; John Feldmann; Matt Malpass; Mat Zo

311 chronology
Mosaic (2017)	Voyager (2019)	Full Bloom (2024)

Singles from Voyager
- 1. "Good Feeling" Released: April 12, 2019; 2. "Don't You Worry" Released: April 12, 2019; 3. "Crossfire" Released: May 24, 2019

Professional ratings
Review scores
Source	Rating
AllMusic	4/5 stars
Blabbermouth.net	7/10

Voyager is the thirteenth studio album by American rock band 311. It was released on July 12, 2019. It is the second to be produced by John Feldmann and the fifth to be produced by Scotch Ralston. Matan Zohar is also listed as a producer. It is 311's first album since their 1995 self-titled album to not debut in the top 10 of the Billboard 200, peaking only at number 18.

== Composition ==
Voyager has been labeled as alternative rock and rap rock by Rock Cellar Magazine, and reggae rock by AllMusic.

== Track listing ==
No.	Title	Lyrics	Music	Length
1.	"Crossfire"	Nick Hexum; Doug "SA" Martinez	Hexum; Noisestorm*	2:38
2.	"Don't You Worry"	Hexum; Mat Zo	Hexum; Mat Zo	3:37
3.	"Stainless"	Hexum; Martinez; Aaron "P-Nut" Wills; Scott "Scotch" Ralston	Hexum; Geoffrey Earley	3:50
4.	"Space and Time"	Hexum; Martinez; Nicholas Furlong	Hexum	3:34
5.	"Dream State"	Hexum; Ralston	Chad Sexton	3:15
6.	"Good Feeling"	Hexum; Martinez; Fiona Bevan; Feldmann; Matt Malpass	Hexum; Martinez; Bevan; Feldmann	3:23
7.	"What The?!"	Hexum; Martinez; Wills; Furlong	Tim Mahoney	3:34
8.	"Better Space"	Hexum; Martinez	Sexton	3:23
9.	"Dodging Raindrops"	Hexum; Wills; Feldmann; Furlong; Malpass	Hexum; Wills; Feldmann; Furlong	3:27
10.	"Rolling Through"	Hexum; Martinez; Ralston	Sexton	2:53
11.	"Born to Live"	Hexum; Wills; E. Kidd Bogart; Feldmann	Hexum; Wills; Bogart; Feldmann	3:30
12.	"Charge It Up"	Hexum; Martinez	Sexton	3:12
13.	"Lucid Dreams"	Hexum; Feldmann; Furlong; Malpass	Hexum; Feldmann; Furlong	3:49
Total length:				44:05

Note

- * Not originally credited as a songwriter, but later given a credit.

== Personnel ==
Credits adapted from liner notes.

311

- Nick Hexum – vocals (lead vocals on all tracks), guitar, keyboards
- SA Martinez – vocals (lead vocals on 1, 3, 4, 6–8, 10–12)
- Chad Sexton – drums
- Tim Mahoney – lead guitar
- P-Nut – bass

Additional musicians

- Luke Miller – keyboards (tracks 4 and 7)

Production

- Produced and recorded by Scotch Ralston (tracks 1–5, 7, 8, 10, and 12)
  - Assisted by Jason Walters
- Produced and recorded by John Feldmann (tracks 6, 9, 11, and 13)
  - Additional production and engineer: Matt Malpass
- Mixed by Neal Avron
- Mastered by Joe Gastwirt
- Management: Peter Katsis, Peter Raspler, Joel Mark at YMU Group
- Album artwork: Sam Williams at Magictorch
- Art direction: Randall Leddy
- Band photos: Brian Bowen Smith
- A&R: Joel Mark
- Marketing: Jason Hradil

== Charts ==
Chart (2019)	Peak position
US Billboard 200	18
