= All Mixed Up (311 song) =

Single by 311

from the album 311
- Released: February 1996
- Recorded: 1995
- Genre: Rap rock, funk rock, reggae rock
- Length: 3:02
- Label: Capricorn
- Songwriters: S. A. Martinez, Nick Hexum
- Producer: Ron Saint Germain

311 singles chronology
| "Down" (1996) | "All Mixed Up" (1996) | "Transistor" (1997) |

Music video
- "All Mixed Up" on YouTube

"All Mixed Up" is a single released by 311. It was on the album 311. The song was co-written by Douglas Vincent "SA" Martinez and Nick Hexum. The duo first started working on the song during the 311 tour supporting Grassroots. After the tour Martinez wrote the lyrics about feeling "confused and being unfaithful" and Hexum took the song's title from an early Elvis Presley interview in which Elvis claimed he was "all mixed up" over his new-found fame. It later became one of the band’s signature singles. It was reserviced to radio in September 1996.

The band often performs a rearranged version of the song that appears on setlists as "All Re-Mixed Up."

The song uses elements of the Stalag riddim and also begins with a sample from reggae artist Yellowman's song Mister Chin on the album Mister Yellowman The song contains instrumental sampling and interpolated vocals from dancehall artist Tenor Saw's 1985 song "Ring The Alarm" throughout.

== Music video ==
The music video is filmed in New York City and it features the band visiting a massage parlor, riding in a taxi cab, and performing the song for a small audience in an apartment.

== Track listing ==
| No. | Title | Length |
|---|---|---|
| 1. | "All Mixed Up" | 3:02 |
| 2. | "Hydroponic" | 3:54 |
| 3. | "My Stoney Baby" | 3:44 |
| 4. | "Homebrew" | 3:04 |

== Charts ==
| Chart (1996–1997) | Peak position |
|---|---|
| US Radio Songs (Billboard) | 36 |
| US Alternative Airplay (Billboard) | 4 |
| US Pop Airplay (Billboard) | 34 |

== Cover versions ==
Blake Lewis, the runner-up on the sixth season of American Idol, sang a cover of "All Mixed Up" on March 6, 2007, telling host Ryan Seacrest afterwards that 311 was his all-time favorite band. Idol judges Randy Jackson and Paula Abdul were not familiar with the song. Hexum said his phone was "ringing off the hook" after Lewis' performance.

== Certifications ==
| Region | Certification | Certified units/sales |
|---|---|---|
| United States (RIAA) | Platinum | 1,000,000^{‡} |
^{‡} Sales+streaming figures based on certification alone.
