= Amber (song) =

Single from the band 311

Single by 311

from the album From Chaos
- Released: February 11, 2002
- Genre: Reggae rock, alternative rock
- Length: 3:29 (album version); 2:58 (radio edit)
- Label: Volcano
- Songwriter: Nick Hexum
- Producers: Saint; 311

311 singles chronology
"I'll Be Here Awhile" (2001)	"Amber" (2002)	"Creatures (For a While)" (2003)

Music video
- "Amber" on YouTube

"Amber" is a song from American rock band 311. A reggae rock song, "Amber" was inspired by vocalist Nick Hexum's relationship with singer Nicole Scherzinger. Scherzinger appears briefly in the music video, playing in the ocean with Hexum. It reached number 13 on the Billboard Modern Rock Tracks chart. It was certified 3× Platinum by the RIAA.

The song's intro was remixed on Greatest Hits '93–'03.

== Composition ==
The song is composed in the key of C major.

The song reflects a more calming, reggae style, compared to some of the band’s earlier, more alternative work.

== In popular culture ==
A live performance video clip of "Amber" was featured on the DVD extras for the 2004 movie 50 First Dates, starring Adam Sandler and Drew Barrymore, and the album version of "Amber" was featured in the film.

The song was included on the soundtrack to the 2010 film Dear John. The song is also featured in the 2008 movie, Forgetting Sarah Marshall.

The song was featured in the American Dad! episode "The Legend of Mike Madonia, the Rototiller Man".

The song appears during the closing credits in the fifth episode of “Widow’s Bay” and also as incidental music.

== Charts ==
Chart (2002)	Peak position
US Billboard Modern Rock Tracks	13
US Billboard Adult Top 40	27
US Bubbling Under Hot 100 (Billboard)	3

== Certifications ==
Region	Certification	Certified units/sales
New Zealand (RMNZ)	Gold	15,000^{‡}
United States (RIAA)	3× Platinum	3,000,000^{‡}
^{‡} Sales+streaming figures based on certification alone.

== Release history ==
Region	Date	Format(s)	Label(s)	Ref(s).
United States	February 11, 2002	Alternative radio	Volcano	
United States	February 18–19, 2002	Hot adult contemporary; modern adult contemporary radio	Volcano	
