= Mosaic (311 album) =

Studio album by 311
- Released: June 23, 2017
- Studios: The Hive, North Hollywood, California
- Genres: Alternative rock; reggae rock; rap rock
- Length: 60:32
- Label: BMG
- Producers: Scotch Ralston; John Feldmann

311 chronology
Archive (2015)	Mosaic (2017)	Voyager (2019)

Singles from Mosaic
- 1. "Too Much to Think" Released: March 11, 2017; 2. "'Til the City's on Fire" Released: August 8, 2017

Mosaic is the twelfth studio album by the American rock band 311. Released on June 23, 2017, it is the band's first album to be released by the label BMG, their first to be produced by John Feldmann, and their fourth to be produced by Scotch Ralston. The track listing was revealed by Pledge Music on April 10, 2017. Mosaic's album cover features nearly 10,000 photos sent in from 311 fans around the world to create a literal mosaic of the band's members and logo. The full, high quality album artwork is still available to zoom into on truemosaic.com/311albumart/.

== Singles ==
"Too Much to Think" was released as the first official single on March 11, 2017.

"Too Late" was released as the first promotional single on April 13, 2017, and the second, "Perfect Mistake," was released on June 9, 2017.

"Too Late" made its radio debut in Los Angeles, California on May 23, 2017, on KLOS.

"'Til the City's on Fire" was released as the second official single on August 8, 2017.

== Composition ==
Sam Mendez at Ultimate Guitar labeled Mosaic as alternative rock and reggae rock. Glenn Gamboa from Newsday characterized it as rap rock.

== Reception ==
Professional ratings
Review scores
Source	Rating
AllMusic	4/5 stars
Newsday	B+
Spectrum Culture	3.75/5

Mosaic was well-received upon release, with praise being directed towards a perceived return to peak musical, creative, and conceptual form. In a positive review from AllMusic, author Neil Z. Yeung notes that "it's a triumphant declaration from these vets, a rousing promise that the party has yet to end," giving the album four stars.

== Commercial performance ==
Mosaic debuted at number six on the US Billboard 200 with 39,000 album-equivalent units, of which 37,000 were pure album sales.

== Track listing ==
No.	Title	Lyrics	Music	Length
1.	"Too Much to Think"	Nick Hexum; John Feldmann	N. Hexum; Zakk Cervini; Feldmann; Matt Pauling	3:54
2.	"Wildfire"	N. Hexum; Doug "SA" Martinez; Aaron "P-Nut" Wills	N. Hexum; Gabe Isaac	5:28
3.	"The Night Is Young"		N. Hexum; Isaac	3:48
4.	"Island Sun"	N. Hexum; Scott "Scotch" Ralston	Hexum	3:00
5.	"Perfect Mistake"	N. Hexum; Martinez; Wills; Feldmann	N. Hexum; Martinez; Wills; Feldmann	3:10
6.	"Extension"	N. Hexum; Martinez	N. Hexum; Isaac	2:51
7.	"Inside Our Home"	N. Hexum; Evan Taubenfeld	N. Hexum; Dillon Pace; Taubenfeld	3:40
8.	"'Til the City's on Fire"	N.Hexum; Cervini; Feldmann; Pauling	N. Hexum; Wills; Feldmann	2:56
9.	"Too Late"	N. Hexum; Ralston	N. Hexum	5:23
10.	"Hey Yo"	N. Hexum; Martinez; Ralston	N. Hexum; Geoffrey Earley	3:33
11.	"Places That the Mind Goes"	N. Hexum; Alan Hampton	N. Hexum; Nathaniel Caserta; Feldmann; Hampton	3:00
12.	"Face in the Wind"	N. Hexum; Martinez; Ralston; Wills	Tim Mahoney	3:40
13.	"Forever Now (Note: Despite not being a credited songwriter of "Forever Now," Nick Hexum's wife, Nicole Hexum, is listed as a songwriter by BMI. It is unknown if she is listed as a songwriter by BMI for music, lyrics, or both.)"	N. Hexum; Zack Hexum	N. Hexum; Z. Hexum	3:26
14.	"Days of '88"	N. Hexum; Martinez; Ralston	Chad Sexton	3:54
15.	"One and the Same"	N. Hexum; Martinez; Wills	N. Hexum; Wills	3:27
16.	"Syntax Error"	Ralston (Note: "Syntax Error" is the only original 311 song in which none of the band members had a hand in writing the lyrics.)	Sexton	2:13
17.	"On a Roll"	N. Hexum; Feldmann; Ralston	N. Hexum; Cervini; Feldmann; Pauling	3:09
Total length:				60:32

== Personnel ==
Credits adapted from liner notes.

311

- Nick Hexum – vocals (lead vocals on all tracks), guitar, keyboards (uncredited), composition
- Doug "SA" Martinez – vocals (lead vocals on 2, 5, 6, 9, 10, 12–15, 17), composition
- Tim Mahoney – guitar, composition
- P-Nut – bass, composition
- Chad Sexton – drums, mixing (tracks: 2–4, 6, 7, 9, 10, 12–16), composition

Additional personnel

- Nathaniel Caserta – composition (track: 11)
- Zakk Cervini – engineering and mixing (tracks: 1, 5, 8, 11, and 17), composition
- Geoffrey Earley – composition (track: 10)
- John Feldmann – production and recording (tracks: 1, 5, 8, 11, and 17), composition
- Nicole Hexum – composition (track: 13)
- Zack Hexum – composition (track: 13)
- Joe Gastwirt – mastering
- Alan Hampton – backing vocals (track: 11), composition
- Gabe Isaac – composition (tracks: 2, 3, and 6)
- Dillon Pace – composition (track: 7)
- Matt Pauling – additional production and engineering (tracks: 1, 5, 8, 11, and 17), composition
- Scotch Ralston – production and recording (tracks: 2–4, 6, 7, 9, 10, 12–16), composition
- Evan Taubenfeld – composition (track: 7)

== Charts ==
=== Weekly charts ===
Chart (2017)	Peak position
US Billboard 200	6
US Top Alternative Albums (Billboard)	2
US Top Rock Albums (Billboard)	2

=== Year-end charts ===
Chart (2017)	Position
US Independent Albums (Billboard)	29
US Top Rock Albums (Billboard)	100
