= Hey You (311 song) =

Single by 311

from the album Uplifter
- B-side: "I Like the Way"
- Released: April 10, 2009
- Recorded: 2009
- Length: 3:35
- Label: Volcano Entertainment
- Songwriters: Nick Hexum, SA Martinez
- Producers: Bob Rock, 311

311 singles chronology
"Frolic Room" (2005)	"Hey You" (2009)	"It's Alright" (2009)

Music video
- "Hey You" on YouTube

"Hey You" is a song written and recorded by American rock band 311. It is the first single from the group's ninth studio album, Uplifter. The single was released through Volcano Entertainment on April 10, 2009. It was received generally well and became their eighth top-five hit on the Billboard Alternative Songs chart.

== Release and reception ==
"Hey You" was released to radio stations on April 7, 2009 and was made available for digital download on April 10. The song was well received, generating numerous favorable reviews.

William Goldman at Spin Magazine praised the song, saying that "Omaha's pseudo-Rasta rap-rockers are still around—and better than ever!" Later in his review he says that 311 keeps their same unique sound, "But there's an important addition to the formula: Go-to rock/metal producer Bob Rock (Metallica, the Offspring), who toughens the track's hardest rockin' sections while keeping its smooth, Caribbean influences warm and mellow. Irie, indeed!"

== Music video ==
The music video for "Hey You" was directed by Joe Lynch, and it premiered on May 7, 2009 at Yahoo Music. The video starts with a man at an intersection in Los Angeles holding a big sign that has "Hey You!" written on both sides. He begins flipping through his iPod until he finds "Hey You". Once the song starts, he begins to dance around with the sign, doing things like flipping it over his back and spinning it. You see the band playing behind him for most of the song. Towards the end of the video, the dancing man notices three ninjas carrying signs that read "Feeling Down? 817-717-6311", "Unemployed", and "Got Debt?". He fights them off with his "Hey You" sign, and the video ends with everyone dancing in one scene, including the ninjas.

== Track listing ==
7" vinyl and digital download

No.	Title	Writer(s)	Length
1.	"Hey You"	Nick Hexum, SA Martinez	3:35
2.	"I Like the Way"	Hexum, Martinez, Chad Sexton	4:00
Total length:			7:35

== Charts ==
Chart (2009)	Peak position
U.S. Billboard Alternative Songs	3
U.S. Billboard Mainstream Rock	38
