= Creatures (For a While) =

Single by 311

from the album Evolver
- Released: July 1, 2003
- Length: 4:24
- Label: Capricorn
- Composers: Nick Hexum; Tim Mahoney
- Lyricists: Hexum; Doug "SA" Martinez
- Producers: Ron Saint Germain; 311

311 singles chronology
"Amber" (2002)	"Creatures (For a While)" (2003)	"Beyond the Gray Sky" (2003)

Music video
- "Creatures (For a While)" on YouTube

"Creatures (For a While)" is a song by the American rock band 311, released as the first single from the band's 2003 album Evolver. It was generally well received and has been seen as one of the band's best songs.

== Background ==
Nick Hexum got the idea for the song after seeing an old punk rock poster that said "A few drinks, a few smokes, and then... creatures for a while" with a guy and a girl on it, according to an interview Hexum did with Greg Prato, Hexum also said he couldn't remember if it was associated with a band or not.

== Release and reception ==
"Creatures (For a While)" impacted most radio stations as the first single from 311's seventh studio album Evolver (2003), with the single being serviced on July 1 that year. The song has been well received, with critics such as Dan Weiss stating that it is "the rare aggro moment for [311] where all clocks are in sync and the riffs and chorus legitimately bangs", noting that "They’d be so good if they were capable of firing on all cylinders like this all the time. Johnny Loftus of AllMusic called it "'Evolver's "Come Original,"', noting that it has an "inescapable riff wrapped around stinging snare hits and S.A.'s endearing/annoying drop-ins." In Pittsburgh Post-Gazette, Scott Mervis called it a "vintage 311 track with guitars going bubbly to heavy and Nick Hexum's flat vocals getting the pick-me-up from inhouse rapper S.A. Martinez." The song had a music video produced by the Malloy Brothers.

Some reviews were less positive of the song. In the Sacramento Bee, Chris Macias lowlighted the synths and sequencers, commenting that they "don't add much to the song's overall effect (plus, electronica is soooo '97)."

The song appears on the soundtrack of the 2003 racing video game NASCAR Thunder 2004.

== Charts ==
Chart performance
Chart (2003)	Peak position
US Alternative Airplay (Billboard)	3
US Bubbling Under Hot 100 (Billboard)	18
