= Don't Stay Home =

1995 single by 311

Single by 311

from the album 311
- Released: 1995
- Length: 2:43
- Label: Capricorn
- Songwriter: Nick Hexum
- Producer: Ron Saint Germain

311 singles chronology
"8:16 A.M." (1994)	"Don't Stay Home" (1995)	"Down" (1995)

Music video
- "Don't Stay Home" on YouTube

"Don't Stay Home" is the first single released by 311 from their self-titled third album. A music video was also released for the single.

== Music video ==
The music video seems to shift between winter and summer, as the band members are seen both with winter coats and shirtless. The video is mostly in black and white. The band can be seen playing the song throughout the video with water splashing in the background and other parts zoom up to Nick Hexum's face with him wearing the hood on his coat. The video was filmed on the Asbury Park beach in New Jersey, and many other locations including a soundstage.

== Charts ==
Chart (1995)	Peak position
US Modern Rock Tracks (Billboard)	29
