= Five of Everything =

Single by 311

from the album Stereolithic
- Released: February 4, 2014
- Length: 3:51
- Label: 311 Records
- Songwriters: Nick Hexum, SA Martinez, Scott Ralston
- Producer: Scott Ralston

311 singles chronology
"Count Me In" (2011)	"Five of Everything" (2014)	"Showdown" (2014)

Music video
- "Five of Everything" on YouTube

"Five of Everything" is a song by the American rock band 311. It was the first single released from their 11th studio album Stereolithic, on February 4, 2014. The band's vocalist, Nick Hexum, said, "This song rocks. I'm glad we're starting with a rocker."

== Reception ==
Nick Catucci in Entertainment Weekly wrote that the band's sound "never really changed with the times" and that "Five of Everything" sounded like it could have been on their 311 album.

== Music video ==
On February 19, 2014, a music video for the song was premiered on Yahoo! Music. The video shows the band in the studio playing the song. It was directed by Brian Bowen Smith and edited by B. Love.
