= Full Bloom (311 album) =

Studio album by 311
- Released: October 25, 2024
- Recorded: August 2023 – May 2024
- Studios: The Hive, North Hollywood, California
- Length: 32:00
- Label: SKP
- Producers: Scotch Ralston; Colin Brittain; Tim Pagnotta; Ian Walsh; Chad Sexton; Evan Miles Anderson

311 chronology
Voyager (2019)	Full Bloom (2024)

Singles from Full Bloom
- 1. "You're Gonna Get It" Released: June 7, 2024; 2. "Need Somebody" Released: September 18, 2024

Professional ratings
Review scores
Source	Rating
AllMusic	3.5/5 stars
Spill Magazine	9/10

Full Bloom is the fourteenth studio album by American rock band 311, released on October 25, 2024. It is the first to be produced by Colin Brittain and the sixth to be produced by Scotch Ralston. Tim Pagnotta is also listed as a producer. It is the first 311 album since 2019's Voyager, which marks the longest gap between studio LPs in the band's career. The album was released through SKP, a company founded by lead singer Nick Hexum and his wife Nikki Hexum, which strives to help upcoming musicians publish their music without the takeaways of record labels. Full Bloom is the first ever album to be released through SKP.

== Background and recording ==
In a June 2023 interview with American trade magazine Variety, frontman Nick Hexum confirmed that 311 would begin recording new material for their fourteenth studio album: "We're making new music right now. We've got sessions planned to rehearse the new tunes this summer and record them for real in August." The band announced on social media in September 2023 that they were back in the studio. Hexum also added in his interview with Variety that the new material planned to be recorded was "311 on steroids".

On March 9, 2024, 311 performed a live debut of the unreleased single "You're Gonna Get It" during their two-night 311 day celebration at Dolby Live in Las Vegas, Nevada. "Hey did you guys hear that we were working on new music? This song is called...'You're Gonna Get It'."

In May 2024 during a livestream on Twitch with lead singer Nick Hexum, he stated that the upcoming album has been completed, and has been sent out to publishing to be printed.

Later that month, a website was promoted across 311's social media platforms, fight.311.com (which now redirects to unlock.311.com, a promotional countdown website for Full Bloom's second single, "Need Somebody"). Upon entering, the site was set in a dimly lit room. It showed an intractable flyer on the wall of the room. Upon clicking, it prompted the user to enter a "fighter name". A few days later, the website was updated to show two characters, one portrayed by Nick Hexum. It would prompt the user to choose their fighter.

On June 6, 2024, the band announced via social media that their first single in five years, and music video in seven years would be released on June 7, 2024, for the song "You're Gonna Get It", which was debuted live three months prior in Las Vegas, Nevada. The main storyline of the music video follows each of the five band members portraying characters in a fight club, inspired by the hit 1999 action movie, Fight Club. The video also includes shots of the band performing the song in the same room with cheering fans circled around them. "You're Gonna Get It" charted on the Alternative Airplay chart at a peak position of #17 for 17 weeks.

On September 16, 2024, unlock.311.com was promoted across all social media platforms by the band, similar to the promotion of the previous single. The website would display sand across the screen, that upon wiping away would reveal an orange lotus flower and a countdown. The next day, the band announced a new song titled "Need Somebody", that would be released on September 18. The song was released alongside an official announcement that the album was titled Full Bloom and would be released on October 25, 2024.

On October 25, 311 released a music video for the title track "Full Bloom", featuring the band performing in a soundstage with three high quality video effects walls behind the band. The video is the first 311 music video filmed in 4K and a 21:9 aspect ratio.

311 described the album on social media as "a huge step forward for our band. It's 311 on steroids."

== Track listing ==
Full Bloom track listing
No.	Title	Writer(s)	Producer(s)	Length
1.	"You're Gonna Get It"	Nick Hexum; Doug Martinez; Colin Brittain; Elijah Noll	Colin Brittain	2:49
2.	"Need Somebody"	Hexum; Martinez; Brittain; Noll	Brittain	3:07
3.	"Full Bloom"	Hexum; Tim Pagnotta; Ian Walsh	Pagnotta; Walsh	2:47
4.	"Friend"	Hexum; Chad Sexton; Aaron Wills; Scotch Ralston	Sexton	3:18
5.	"Mountain Top"	Hexum; Brittain; Noll	Brittain	3:45
6.	"New Heights"	Hexum; Walsh; Sam Hollander; Pagnotta	Pagnotta; Walsh	2:58
7.	"Days Go By"	Hexum; Martinez; Sexton	Sexton	3:10
8.	"Persimmon"	Hexum; Martinez; Tim Mahoney	Scotch Ralston	3:56
9.	"All You've Seen"	Hexum; Martinez; Sexton; Ralston	Sexton	3:15
10.	"Braver"	Martinez; Evan Miles Anderson	Anderson	2:45
Total length:				32:00

== Personnel ==
311

- Nick Hexum – vocals, guitar
- Doug "SA" Martinez – vocals
- Chad Sexton – drums
- Tim Mahoney – guitar
- Aaron "P-Nut" Wills – bass

Technical personnel

- Evan Miles Anderson – engineer
- Colin Brittain – engineer, mixing
- Tom Grasso – engineer
- Nick Hexum – engineer
- Emerson Mancini – mastering
- Kevin McCombs – engineer, mixing
- Tim Pagnotta – engineer
- Scotch Ralston – engineer
- Chad Sexton – engineer
- Ian Walsh – engineer

== Charts ==
Chart performance for Full Bloom
Chart (2024)	Peak position
US Billboard 200	118
