= Uplifter =

Studio album by 311
- Released: June 2, 2009
- Recorded: 2008–2009
- Studio: Ocean Studios (Burbank, California)
- Genres: Alternative rock; reggae
- Length: 46:54 (Standard Edition); 56:00 (Deluxe Edition)
- Label: Volcano
- Producer: Bob Rock

311 studio album chronology
Don't Tread on Me (2005)	Uplifter (2009)	Universal Pulse (2011)

Singles from Uplifter
- 1. "Hey You" Released: April 10, 2009; 2. "It's Alright" Released: June 9, 2009

Uplifter is the ninth studio album by American rock band 311, released on June 2, 2009 by Volcano Records. It was the band's first album in nearly four years. Uplifter was produced by Bob Rock. It debuted at #3 on the Billboard 200, their highest position to date.

== Release ==
The first single from the album, "Hey You", was sent to radio stations for airplay on April 7, and was officially released April 10, 2009. Before the official release date, Uplifter was streamed in full (including the deluxe edition tracks) on the band's MySpace page and was featured on Playlist.com.

== Reception ==
Professional ratings
Review scores
Source	Rating
AllMusic	2.5/5 stars
Beats per Minute	31%
Consequence	D
IGN	6/10 stars
Sputnikmusic	4/5
Ultimate Guitar	(4.8/10)

Uplifter has received mixed reactions from critics. Andrew Leahey of AllMusic gave it a generally favorable review and said that Uplifter "...[wields] a polished mix of tour-worthy anthems and lighter-hoisting ballads that seem destined to fare better in concert than on record."

It has received criticism as well. Talking about the lyrics, Laina Dawes of Consequence of Sound said, "...don't look for any insightful wisdom here. ... Then again, how important are lyrics in this genre, or even this modern day age of Britney Spears and Lady Gaga? In comparison to that schlock, this is pure poetry."

Colin Moriarty of IGN reviewed each of the songs from Uplifter one-by-one. He said that while some show 311 maturing musically, there are still songs for the hardcore fans. Moriarty noted that his favorite song from the album was "Get Down," saying, "311 songs with a message and a hard-hitting rap-rock sound have become increasingly rare since the days of Soundsystem and From Chaos, and "Get Down" is certainly a welcome addition to Uplifter's roster of songs."

== Track listing ==
No.	Title	Writer(s)	Lead vocals	Length
1.	"Hey You"	Nick Hexum, SA Martinez	Nick Hexum, SA Martinez	3:56
2.	"It's Alright"	Hexum, Martinez, Aaron Wills	Hexum	3:35
3.	"Mix It Up"	Hexum	Hexum	2:54
4.	"Golden Sunlight"	Hexum, Tim Mahoney, Martinez, Chad Sexton	Hexum, Martinez	4:30
5.	"India Ink"	Hexum	Hexum	3:37
6.	"Daisy Cutter"	Hexum	Hexum	3:54
7.	"Too Much Too Fast"	Hexum, Martinez	Hexum, Martinez	3:53
8.	"Never Ending Summer"	Hexum, Sexton, Wills	Hexum	4:05
9.	"Two Drops in the Ocean"	Hexum, Martinez	Hexum, Martinez	3:47
10.	"Something Out of Nothing"	Hexum, Martinez	Martinez, Hexum	4:25
11.	"Jackpot"	Hexum, Martinez, Sexton	Hexum, Martinez	3:54
12.	"My Heart Sings"	Hexum	Hexum	4:23
Total length:				46:54

=== Bonus tracks ===
iTunes exclusive track (later included on the Archive compilation)
No.	Title	Writer(s)	Lead vocals	Length
13.	"How Long Has It Been" (track 15 on iTunes deluxe edition)	Hexum, Martinez	Hexum, Martinez	3:13
Total length:				50:07

Amazon exclusive track (later included on the Archive compilation)
No.	Title	Writer(s)	Lead vocals	Length
13.	"Sun Come Through"	Hexum, Martinez, Sexton	Hexum, Martinez	3:27
Total length:				50:21

Deluxe edition (later included on the Archive compilation)
No.	Title	Writer(s)	Lead vocals	Length
13.	"I Like the Way"	Hexum, Martinez, Sexton	Hexum, Martinez	4:00
14.	"Get Down"	Hexum, Martinez, Sexton	Hexum, Martinez	5:06
Total length:				56:00

Released on Archive compilation
No.	Title	Writer(s)	Lead vocals	Length
17.	"Simplify"	Hexum	Hexum	5:15
18.	"Week of Saturdays"	Hexum	Hexum	3:22

== Personnel ==
Credits adapted from album’s liner notes.

311

- Nick Hexum – vocals, rhythm guitar, keyboards
- SA Martinez – vocals, turntables
- Chad Sexton – drums, backing vocals on "Daisy Cutter" and "Jackpot"
- Tim Mahoney – lead guitar, backing vocals on "Daisy Cutter" and "Jackpot"
- Aaron Wills – bass, backing vocals on "Daisy Cutter" and "Jackpot"

Additional Musicians

- Adam Merrin – piano on "Too Much Too Fast"
- Native Wayne Jobson – intro narration on "Never Ending Summer"

Production

- Bob Rock – producer, mixing
- Eric Helmkamp – engineer
- Giff Tripp – assistant engineer
- Jason Walters – Hive Studio manager
- George Marino – mastering

== Chart performance ==
=== Album ===
Chart (2009)	Peak position	Sales
US Billboard 200	3	60,000
US Billboard Rock Albums	2	—N/a
US Billboard Digital Albums	3	—N/a
US Billboard Alternative Albums	2	—N/a

=== Singles ===
Song	Chart (2009)	Peak position
"Hey You"	U.S. Billboard Alternative Songs	3
"Hey You"	U.S. Billboard Mainstream Rock Tracks	38
"Hey You"	U.S. Billboard Rock Songs	17
"It's Alright"	U.S. Billboard Alternative Songs	16
"It's Alright"	U.S. Billboard Rock Songs	38
