= Prisoner (311 song) =

Single by 311

from the album Transistor
- Released: 1997
- Length: 2:50
- Label: Capricorn Records
- Songwriter: Nick Hexum
- Producer: Scotch Ralston

311 singles chronology
"Transistor" (1997)	"Prisoner" (1997)	"Beautiful Disaster" (1997)

Music video
- "Prisoner" on YouTube

"Prisoner" is the second track and second single from 311's 1997 album Transistor. When being interviewed in 1999, SA Martinez stated that "Prisoner" is his favorite 311 song. The song is about feeling trapped and someone not being themselves.

== Music video ==
The music video begins with a woman entering a cold pool. With the pool's lid closed, the band members perform the song in what appears to be a basement, while various men in uniforms can be seen in the background. Throughout the video, clips of the woman in the pool are intermittently shown. Later, the band members themselves are seen in the same pool. The music video for "Prisoner" was shot in Los Angeles, California.

== Track listing ==
1. "Prisoner" (album version) – 2:50
2. "Transistor" (Single Malt Mix) – 3:04
3. "Prisoner" (DJ Spina & Tickla Remix) – 2:50
4. "Prisoner" (DJ Sean Perry Mix) – 2:50

== Charts ==
Chart (1997)	Peak position
US Billboard Modern Rock Tracks	21
