= Down (311 song) =

1996 single by 311

Single by 311

from the album 311
- B-side: "Jackolantern's Weather"; "Do You Right"
- Released: July 9, 1996
- Genre: Alternative rock; rap rock; hard rock
- Length: 2:53
- Label: Capricorn
- Songwriters: Nick Hexum; S.A. Martinez
- Producer: Ron Saint Germain

311 singles chronology
"Don't Stay Home" (1995)	"Down" (1996)	"All Mixed Up" (1996)

Music video
- "Down" on YouTube

"Down" is a song by the American rock band 311. It is the first song on their third album, 311, and became their first number-one single on the US Billboard Modern Rock Tracks chart. An accompanying video for the song was in rotation on MTV at the time of its release. The song was included as the first song on their live album, Live, and on their greatest hits album, Greatest Hits '93–'03. Since its release, it has also become a staple of their live concerts, and is usually dedicated "to all the old-school 311 fans." Following the terrorist attacks on September 11, 2001, it was placed on the list of post-9/11 inappropriate titles distributed by Clear Channel.

== Composition ==
On the lyrical inspiration, Nick Hexum said, "It was the idea, 'If I ever didn't thank you, then just let me do it now.' It was both to our fans and me saying to the other band members, 'What a trip it's been to come from Nebraska, with pretty much nothing but a dream, and then to see it come true, and the unity we have in the band - the all for one, one for all spirit.'" "Down" contains dancehall vocals, hard rock guitars and turntable scratches. Spin magazine compared "Down" to music by the band Bad Brains, and described it as having a "dynamic" verse.

== Music video ==
The music video consists of the band performing in a warehouse and includes scenes of the band members singing the song in various backgrounds, such as a rotating coin, a circle with flowing sparks, dancing in front of a paper wall display. Also included are scenes in which the band members are meditating with an obese spiritual man who sometimes floats in the air through the power of meditation while one of the band members experiences it.

== Track listing ==
No.	Title	Length
1.	"Down"	2:53
2.	"Down" (live)	3:06
3.	"Jackolantern's Weather"	3:25
4.	"Do You Right"	4:18

== Charts ==
=== Weekly charts ===
Weekly chart performance for "Down"
Chart (1996)	Peak position
Australia (ARIA)	41
Canada Top Singles (RPM)	60
Canada Rock/Alternative (RPM)	4
US Radio Songs (Billboard)	37
US Alternative Airplay (Billboard)	1
US Mainstream Rock (Billboard)	19

=== Year-end charts ===
Year-end chart performance for "Down"
Chart (1996)	Position
Canada Rock/Alternative (RPM)	37
US Mainstream Rock Tracks (Billboard)	87
US Modern Rock Tracks (Billboard)	11

== Certifications ==
Certifications for "Down"
Region	Certification	Certified units/sales
United States (RIAA)	Platinum	1,000,000^{‡}
^{‡} Sales+streaming figures based on certification alone.

== Release history ==
Release dates and formats for "Down"
Region	Date	Format(s)	Label(s)	Ref.
United States	July 9, 1996	Alternative radio	Capricorn	
United States	August 6, 1996	Contemporary hit radio	Capricorn	

== Cover versions ==
- Grindcore band Anal Cunt parodied the song on their 1997 album I Like It When You Die with the title "311 Sucks." It features the riff of "Down" and rapped gibberish nonsense lyrics, concluding with lead singer Seth Putnam screaming "You fucking suck!"
- On July 20, 2018, the Offspring released a cover version of this song, while 311 released a "reggaefied" version of the latter's "Self Esteem". Those cover versions coincided with the beginning of their 2018 Never Ending Summer co-tour.

== See also ==
- List of Billboard Modern Rock Tracks number ones of the 1990s
