= Beautiful Disaster (311 song) =

Single by 311

from the album Transistor
- Released: December 1997
- Recorded: 1997
- Genre: Alternative rock, reggae rock
- Length: 4:02
- Label: Capricorn
- Songwriter: Nick Hexum
- Producer: Scotch Ralston

311 singles chronology
"Prisoner" (1997)	"Beautiful Disaster" (1997)	"Come Original" (1999)

Music video
- "Beautiful Disaster" on YouTube

"Beautiful Disaster" is a song recorded by the band 311 and released in 1997. It is the third and final single from the album Transistor.

== Reception ==
Consequence of Sound commented that "Beautiful Disaster" may be 311's greatest hit and that it has one of the most recognizable intros in any song.

== Music video ==
The music video features clips of 311 live and with a wild crowd.

== In other media ==
- The song is a playable track in the video game Guitar Hero World Tour.
- The song was used by the professional wrestling tag team of the Motor City Machine Guns in Ring of Honor and CHIKARA Pro.
- The song was used in the video game MLB 11: The Show.
- The song is downloadable content for the video game Rock Band 3.
- This song was used in the Daria season two episode "The Daria Hunter" as the Lawndale High School students are entering the paintball field.
- This song was used in the Orange is the New Black season three episode "A Tittin' and a Hairin'" during a flashback conversation between "Pennsatucky" and her boyfriend outside of a house party. The track can be heard playing in the background.
- The song is downloadable content for the video game Rocksmith.

== Charts ==
Chart (1997)	Peak position
US Billboard Modern Rock Tracks	21

== Certifications ==
Region	Certification	Certified units/sales
United States (RIAA)	Platinum	1,000,000^{‡}
^{‡} Sales+streaming figures based on certification alone.
