= Evolver (311 album) =

Studio album by 311
- Released: July 22, 2003
- Recorded: January – April 2003
- Studio: The Hive (North Hollywood, California)
- Genres: Alternative rock, rap rock, reggae rock
- Length: 41:34
- Label: Volcano
- Producers: Ron Saint Germain, 311

311 chronology
From Chaos (2001)	Evolver (2003)	Greatest Hits '93–'03 (2004)

Singles from Evolver
- 1. "Creatures (For a While)" Released: July 1, 2003; 2. "Beyond The Gray Sky" Released: October 21, 2003

Professional ratings
Review scores
Source	Rating
AllMusic	2.5/5 stars
Blender	2/5 stars
The Encyclopedia of Popular Music	3/5 stars
IGN	8.3/10
Rolling Stone	2/5 stars
The Rolling Stone Album Guide	2/5 stars

Evolver is the seventh studio album by 311. It was released on July 22, 2003, by the now effectively defunct Volcano Entertainment.

== Background ==
The album was the second recorded in 311's recording studio The Hive in North Hollywood, California. Evolver is an "Enhanced CD" containing a featurette on the making of the album cover. The album debuted at number 7 on the US Billboard 200 chart, selling 87,000 copies in its first week of release. In its second week, it dropped to number 29, selling 30,000 copies. By July 2005, the album had sold 324,500 copies in the United States, according to Nielsen SoundScan.

== Track listing ==
All lyrics are written by Nick Hexum and SA Martinez, except tracks 4, 6, "Sometimes Jacks Rule the Realm," and "What Do You Do?" (Hexum).

No.	Title	Music	Length
1.	"Creatures (For a While)"	Hexum; Tim Mahoney	4:24
2.	"Reconsider Everything"	Hexum	2:48
3.	"Crack the Code"	Hexum	3:54
4.	"Same Mistake Twice"	Hexum	3:20
5.	"Beyond the Gray Sky"	Mahoney	4:16
6.	"Seems Uncertain"	Hexum	3:33
7.	"Still Dreaming"	Chad Sexton	3:40
8.	"Give Me a Call"	Hexum; Sexton	3:19
9.	"Don't Dwell"	Hexum; Aaron "P-Nut" Wills	2:37
10.	"Other Side of Things"	Sexton	3:06
11.	"Sometimes Jacks Rule the Realm"	Hexum	6:37
Total length:			41:34

Evolver Japan version bonus track
No.	Title	Music	Length
12.	"What Do You Do?" (later included on the Archive compilation)	Hexum	2:42
Total length:			44:16

- "Sometimes Jacks Rule the Realm" ends at 5:01, followed by the hidden instrumental track "Coda" (Wills) at 5:23. On digital versions of the album, "Sometimes Jacks Rule the Realm" and "Coda" are separate tracks, with "Coda" as track 12.

=== Outtake ===
- "Time Is Precious" (music and lyrics: Hexum) (originally available via 311 website and currently available on Archive compilation) – 3:07

== Personnel ==
- Nick Hexum – vocals (lead vocals on all tracks except "Coda"), guitar
- SA Martinez – vocals (lead vocals on 1–3, 5, 7, 8, 10), turntables
- Tim Mahoney – guitar
- Chad Sexton – drums
- Aaron Wills – bass

== Production ==
- Producer, Engineer, Mixer: Ron Saint Germain
- Engineer: Zack Barnhorst
- Digital editing: Zack Barnhorst
- Mastering: Joe Gastwirt
- Studio technician: Matt Hunter, Daniel Wates
- Art direction: Ron Ulicny
- Directors: Joe Lynch, Steven Oritt
- Concept: Ron Ulicny
- Design: Dan Levin
- Layout design: Dan Levin
- Photo coordination: Amber Vantris
- Photography: Ron Ulicny
- Photo assistance: Jeaneen Lund
- Artwork: Mike Allen, Christy Greenwood, Louie Hozwell, Marguerite Olivelle, Chris Waltes
- Lighting: Todd Hickey

== Charts ==
Album

Year	Chart	Position
2003	The Billboard 200	7

Singles

Year	Single	Chart	Position
2003	"Beyond the Gray Sky"	Modern Rock Tracks	39
2003	"Creatures (For a While)"	Modern Rock Tracks	3
