= You Wouldn't Believe =

Single by 311

from the album From Chaos
- Released: July 3, 2001
- Genre: Alternative rock, rap rock
- Length: 3:40
- Songwriters: Nick Hexum, S.A. Martinez

311 singles chronology
"Large in the Margin" (2000)	"You Wouldn't Believe" (2001)	"I'll Be Here Awhile" (2001)

Music video
- "You Wouldn't Believe" on YouTube

"You Wouldn't Believe" is a single by the band 311 that was first released on their album From Chaos in 2001, which has a music video featuring Shaquille O'Neal. The song appeared on Canadian MuchMusic Top 30 chart. "You Wouldn't Believe" also appeared on the compilation album, Greatest Hits '93–'03, in 2004.

The song also appeared in the video game, Gravity Games Bike: Street Vert Dirt.

A music video was released for the song and featured Shaquille O'Neal.
