= Sunset in July =

Single by 311

from the album Universal Pulse
- Released: June 3, 2011
- Genre: Alternative rock
- Length: 3:53
- Label: 311; ATO
- Songwriters: Nick Hexum; SA Martinez; Aaron "P-Nut" Wills; Chad Sexton
- Producer: Bob Rock

311 singles chronology
"It's Alright" (2009)	"Sunset in July" (2011)	"Time Bomb" (2011)

Music video
- "Sunset in July" on YouTube

"Sunset in July" is a song by American rock band 311. It is the lead single from their tenth studio album, Universal Pulse. The single was first aired June 3, 2011 on Los Angeles radio station KROQ.

== Reception ==
PureGrainAudio.com rated the song a 7.2/10, who says the song is "catchy, groovy and a very chill listen". They conclude that "Sunset in July" is a fun song that should please both casual listeners and hardcore fans.

== Charts ==
Chart (2011)	Peak position
Canada Alternative Rock	28
US Alternative Songs (Billboard)	7
US Rock Songs (Billboard)	21
US Mainstream Rock (Billboard)	36
