= Flowing (song) =

Single by 311

from the album Soundsystem
- Released: 1999
- Genre: Alternative rock
- Length: 3:13
- Label: Capricorn Records
- Songwriter: Nick Hexum
- Producer: Hugh Padgham

311 singles chronology
"Come Original" (1999)	"Flowing" (1999)	"Large in the Margin" (2000)

Music video
- "Flowing" on YouTube

"Flowing" is a song by the group 311. It first appeared on the 1999 album Soundsystem, and was released as the second single from the album. It was included on 311's Greatest Hits '93-'03 album in 2004.

The song did not obtain as much attention as the first single from Soundsystem, "Come Original", but did reach #17 on the Hot Modern Rock Tracks chart.

The lyrics depict lead singer Nick Hexum's bout with insomnia.

== Track listing ==
1. "Flowing (Radio Edit 1)" (3:09)
2. "Flowing (Radio Edit 2)" (2:57)

== Charts ==
Chart (2000)	Peak position
U.S. Billboard Modern Rock Tracks	17
