= Come Original =

Single by 311

from the album Soundsystem
- Released: 1999
- Length: 3:43
- Songwriters: Nick Hexum, S.A. Martinez, Aaron "P-Nut" Wills
- Producers: Hugh Padgham, Scott Ralston

311 singles chronology
"Beautiful Disaster" (1997)	"Come Original" (1999)	"Flowing" (1999)

Music video
- "Come Original" on YouTube

Come Original is a single by American alternative rock band 311, first released on their 1999 album Soundsystem. It was later released on the compilation album Greatest Hits '93-'03. The song references other artists such as Mr. Vegas, Black Eyed Peas, Roni Size, and NOFX.

== Music video ==
The music video for "Come Original" features the band playing the song in front of a green background with a barcode, and a couple of stereo speakers (that is a rendition of the album's artwork), as well of scenes involving skateboarding on a ramp and various people performing breakdancing.

== Charts ==
Chart (1999)	Peak position
U.S. Billboard Mainstream Rock	39
U.S. Billboard Modern Rock Tracks	6
