= It's Alright (311 song) =

Single by 311

from the album Uplifter
- Released: June 9, 2009
- Recorded: 2009
- Length: 3:35
- Label: Volcano Entertainment
- Songwriters: Nick Hexum, SA Martinez, Aaron "P-Nut" Wills
- Producers: Bob Rock, 311

311 singles chronology
"Hey You" (2009)	"It's Alright" (2009)	"Golden Sunlight" (2009)

Audio
- "It's Alright" on YouTube

"It's Alright" is a song written and recorded by American rock band 311. After "Hey You", it was the second single from the group's ninth studio album, Uplifter. The single was released through Volcano Entertainment to radio stations on June 9, 2009.

== Chart performance ==
Chart (2009)	Peak position
U.S. Billboard Alternative Songs	16
U.S. Billboard Rock Songs	38
