= I'll Be Here Awhile =

Single by 311

from the album From Chaos
- Released: 2001
- Length: 3:28
- Label: Volcano Entertainment
- Songwriters: Nick Hexum, S.A. Martinez
- Producer: Ron Saint Germain

311 singles chronology
| "You Wouldn't Believe" (2001) | "I'll Be Here Awhile" (2001) | "Amber" (2001) |

Music video
- "I'll Be Here Awhile" on YouTube

"I'll Be Here Awhile" is a single by alternative rock band 311. It is the 12th and closing track on their album From Chaos. Lead singer Nick Hexum originally wrote it when he was twenty, hence the line in the refrain "Twenty years of age, " though Hexum was thirty when he recorded it. He comments on the interview included on the disc of From Chaos that he was living a wild and crazy life at that young age.

The lyrics "And if a person, place, or thing can deliver/ I will quiver with delight" are taken directly from "The Lust, The Flesh, The Eyes, and the Pride of Life" a song by the Christian alternative rock group The 77s which had appeared on their 1987 self-titled album.

"I'll Be Here Awhile" reached number 15 on the Modern Rock Tracks chart in 2001.

== Track listing ==
1. "I'll Be Here Awhile"
2. "I'll Be Here Awhile" (Acoustic)

== Charts ==
| Chart (2001) | Peak position |
|---|---|
| US Alternative Airplay (Billboard) | 15 |
