= Don't Tread on Me (album) =

Studio album by 311
- Released: August 16, 2005
- Recorded: February – May 2005
- Studio: The Hive (North Hollywood, California)
- Length: 37:27
- Label: Volcano
- Producers: Ron Saint Germain, 311

311 chronology
Greatest Hits '93–'03 (2004)	Don't Tread on Me (2005)	Uplifter (2009)

Singles from Don't Tread on Me
- 1. "Don't Tread on Me" Released: July 25, 2005; 2. "Speak Easy" Released: November 22, 2005; 3. "Frolic Room" Released: June 13, 2006

Don't Tread on Me is the eighth studio album by 311, which was released on August 16, 2005. The first single, "Don't Tread on Me", was released to radio on July 26, 2005. It peaked at #2 on the Billboard Modern Rock Tracks and #1 on the R&R Panel Alternative chart. The second single, "Speak Easy", was released on November 22, 2005 and a third "Frolic Room", was released on June 13, 2006. Don't Tread on Me debuted and peaked at #5 on the Billboard 200, selling 91,000 copies in its first week of release.

== Background ==
This is the third 311 album recorded in 311's recording studio The Hive in North Hollywood, California.

== Reception ==
Professional ratings
Aggregate scores
Source	Rating
Metacritic	51/100
Review scores
Source	Rating
AllMusic	3/5 stars
Blender	2/5 stars
The Encyclopedia of Popular Music	3/5 stars
Entertainment Weekly	C
PopMatters	6/10
Rolling Stone	2/5 stars

According to the review aggregator Metacritic, Don't Tread on Me received "mixed or average reviews" based on a weighted average score of 51 out of 100 from eight critic scores.

== Track listing ==
All lyrics are written by Nick Hexum and SA Martinez, except "Getting Through to Her" and "It's Getting OK Now," written by SA Martinez.

No.	Title	Music	Length
1.	"Don't Tread on Me"	Hexum; Aaron "P-Nut" Wills	3:07
2.	"Thank Your Lucky Stars"	Hexum; Chad Sexton	3:24
3.	"Frolic Room"	Hexum	3:34
4.	"Speak Easy"	Sexton	3:26
5.	"Solar Flare"	Hexum	3:11
6.	"Waiting"	Hexum	3:17
7.	"Long for the Flowers"	Hexum	2:49
8.	"Getting Through to Her"	Martinez; Giff Tripp	3:24
9.	"Whiskey & Wine"	Hexum; Martinez	2:59
10.	"It's Getting OK Now"	Tim Mahoney	3:04
11.	"There's Always an Excuse"	Hexum; Wills	5:07
Total length:			37:27

iTunes Bonus Track
No.	Title	Writer(s)	Length
12.	"Little Brother" (later included on the Archive compilation)	Hexum; Martinez; Sexton; David Kahne	3:27
Total length:			40:54

=== Outtakes ===
Released on Archive compilation

- "Into the Flame" (
  - Hexum
  - Martinez
  - Sexton
  ) – 3:27
- "Stealing My Girl" (later reworked into "The Call" on Stereolithic) (
  - Hexum
  - Martinez
  - Wills
  ) – 2:59

Unreleased

- "Take My Money" (
  - Hexum
  - Martinez
  - Wills
  - Kahne
  ) – 3:27
- "T.H.A.W. (Time Heals All Wounds)" (
  - Hexum
  - Martinez
  )

== Personnel ==
Credits adapted from album’s liner notes.

311

- Nick Hexum – vocals (lead vocals on 1–7, 9, 11, 12, "Into the Flame," "Stealing My Girl," and "Take My Money"), guitar
- S.A. Martinez – vocals (lead vocals on 1–12, "Into the Flame," "Stealing My Girl," and "Take My Money")
- Chad Sexton – drums, percussion
- Tim Mahoney – guitar
- P-Nut – bass

Additional Musicians

- Robert Greenidge – pans on "Speak Easy"

Production

- 311 – producer
- Ron Saint Germain – producer, engineer, mixer
- Giff Tripp – assistant engineer
- David Kahne – additional pre-production
- Jason Walters – studio manager
- Bryan Manley – studio technician
- Joe Gastwirt – mastering
- Shepard Fairey – artwork, design
- Myriam Santos-Kayda – photography
- Pablo Mathiason – A&R

== Chart performance ==
=== Album ===
Year	Chart	Peak position
2005	US Billboard 200	5

=== Singles ===
Year	Single	Chart	Peak position
2005	"Don't Tread on Me"	U.S. Billboard Hot Modern Rock Tracks	2
2005	"Don't Tread on Me"	U.S. Billboard Pop 100	93
2006	"Speak Easy"	U.S. Billboard Hot Modern Rock Tracks	22
