= From Chaos =

Studio album by 311
- Released: June 19, 2001
- Recorded: December 2000 – March 2001
- Studio: The Hive (North Hollywood, California): Sound City (Van Nuys, California)
- Genres: Alternative rock; rap rock
- Length: 39:49
- Label: Volcano
- Producers: 311; Ron Saint Germain

311 chronology
Soundsystem (1999)	From Chaos (2001)	Evolver (2003)

Singles from From Chaos
- 1. "You Wouldn't Believe" Released: July 3, 2001; 2. "I'll Be Here Awhile" Released: 2001; 3. "Amber" Released: February 2002

From Chaos is the sixth studio album by the American rock band 311, released on June 19, 2001, by Volcano Entertainment, and their first album to be recorded through their own recording studio, The Hive in North Hollywood. Singles from this album include "You Wouldn't Believe", "I'll Be Here Awhile", and "Amber".

== Background ==
Much of the album From Chaos was written by the band while on tour in 2000 promoting their fifth studio album Soundsystem. The album name 'From Chaos' was inspired by the band's situation with their previous record label of seven years, Capricorn Records. According to singer Nick Hexum, they "had a lot of disagreements with Capricorn over the years and it was just time to end our relationship." The band sued Capricorn, voided their contract and signed with Volcano Records. The band was going through stress of legal trouble, which brought a negativity environment where albums do not get made; they did not want to make an album surrounding that subject, so most of the album is born out of "relationships and appreciating life" according to Hexum, who takes pride in being up-beat and positive. "Bomb the Town," "Will the World," "We Do It Like This," and "Dreamland" are b-sides from this CD. They can be heard on the bonus disc included with band video documentary Enlarged to Show Detail 2.

== Critical reception ==
Professional ratings
Review scores
Source	Rating
AllMusic	4.5/5 stars
The Encyclopedia of Popular Music	3/5 stars
Kerrang!	3/5 stars
RapReviews	8/10
Rolling Stone	2/5 stars
The Rolling Stone Album Guide	2/5 stars

The album received positive reviews from various music critics. Steve Appleford of Los Angeles Times writes "[the album] "From Chaos" is mostly a repeat of proven 311 formulas (even with strange new flashes of prog-rock flavor), but singers Nicholas Hexum and S.A. Martinez are earnest, energetic MC's, crooning, rapping, shouting across a thundering blend of rock, reggae, hip-hop and psychedelia. Still fresh and funky." Angelique Campbell from Dayton Daily News in Ohio writes, "311 stays with its formula of combining funk, rock and reggae with a dash of catchy pop sensibility on From Chaos." Jacob Lunders, a contributor for AllMusic writes, "From Chaos astonishes and impresses with considerable energy and focus, proving itself as the album 311 has always been capable of making."

However, Paul Massari of The Boston Globe criticized the album, writing "311 tries to demonstrate that it is still relevant in the era of the loud, angry rap-metal band. The death-rock power chords on tracks like "Full Ride" are plodding, and the tone of the gangsta raps is absurdly inflated." Kathryn McGuire of Rolling Stone adds, "311 slings melodramatic metal riffs and whiny verses every which way, and their once-novel fusion seems unfocused and flat." Kristen Koba, founder of PopMatters wrote, "The whiny white boy rap, almost funky bass lines, and grinding guitar riffs just couldn't hold up in a city that offers so much innovative hip-hop and truly vital rock."

== Track listing ==
All lyrics by Nick Hexum and SA Martinez, and music by Hexum, except where noted.

No.	Title	Lyrics	Music	Length
1.	"You Get Worked"		Hexum, Chad Sexton	2:51
2.	"Sick Tight"			2:44
3.	"You Wouldn't Believe"			3:42
4.	"Full Ride"		Sexton	3:05
5.	"From Chaos"			3:15
6.	"I Told Myself"		Hexum, Sexton	4:10
7.	"Champagne"		Hexum, Tim Mahoney	3:04
8.	"Hostile Apostle"			3:42
9.	"Wake Your Mind Up"	William Adams, Trevant Hardson, Hexum	Sexton, Aaron Wills	3:10
10.	"Amber"		Hexum	3:26
11.	"Uncalm"		Hexum, Mahoney	3:11
12.	"I'll Be Here Awhile"		Hexum, Martinez	3:29
Total length:				39:49

B-Sides & outtakes
No.	Title	Writer(s)	Length
13.	"Bomb the Town" (Appears on the Enlarged to Show Detail 2 bonus EP)	Hexum, Martinez	3:32
14.	"Dreamland" (Appears on the Enlarged to Show Detail 2 bonus EP)	Mahoney	1:14
15.	"We Do It Like This" (Appears on the Enlarged to Show Detail 2 bonus EP)	Hexum, Martinez	2:46
16.	"Will the World" (Appears on the Enlarged to Show Detail 2 bonus EP)	Hexum	1:05
17.	"Are You Ready? (intro at concerts)" (Available via 311 website)		1:09
18.	"I'll Be Here Awhile (acoustic version)" (Appears on the Enlarged to Show Detail 2 bonus EP and available via 311 website)	Hexum, Martinez

== Personnel ==
Credits adapted from album's liner notes.

311

- Nick Hexum – vocals (lead vocals on tracks 1–12, "Bomb the Town", "We Do It Like This"), rhythm guitar, programming, additional engineering
- Chad Sexton – drums, percussion, programming, additional engineering
- SA Martinez – vocals (lead vocals on tracks 1–9, 11, "Bomb the Town", "We Do It Like This"), turntables
- Tim Mahoney – lead guitar
- Aaron "P-Nut" Wills – bass

Production

- 311 – producer
- Ron Saint Germain – producer, engineer, mixing
- Alex Rivera – additional engineering, Hive Studio tech and engineer
- Mike Terry – tracking assistant
- Geoff Walcha – mixing assistant
- Scotch Ralston – technical assistance
- Joe Gastwirt – mastering
- Matt Hunter – Hive Studio drum tech
- Ruff Stewart – Hive Studio guitar tech

== Charts ==
=== Album ===
Chart	Peak position
US Billboard 200	10

=== Singles ===
Song	Chart	Peak position
"You Wouldn't Believe"	U.S. Billboard Modern Rock Tracks	7
"You Wouldn't Believe"	U.S. Billboard Mainstream Rock Tracks	32
"I'll Be Here Awhile"	U.S. Billboard Modern Rock Tracks	15
"Amber"	U.S. Billboard Modern Rock Tracks	13

== Certifications ==
Region	Certification	Certified units/sales
United States (RIAA)	Gold	500,000^{^}
^{^} Shipments figures based on certification alone.
