= Transistor (song) =

Single by 311

from the album Transistor
- Released: June 30, 1997
- Length: 3:03
- Label: Capricorn Records
- Songwriters: Nick Hexum, S.A. Martinez, Chad Sexton

311 singles chronology
"All Mixed Up" (1996)	"Transistor" (1997)	"Prisoner" (1997)

Music video
- "Transistor" on YouTube

"Transistor" is the title track by the band 311 from the album Transistor (1997). The song clocks in at approximately 3:03. A music video was also shot and directed for the single.

== Music video ==
The video features the band playing in a small room, while a giant CGI rotating orb travels from different locations showing the band performing in their room on the sides of the orb. Some of the places include a city sidewalk, forest, suburban neighborhood and the Griffith Observatory.

== Charts ==
Chart (1997)	Peak position
US Billboard Mainstream Rock Tracks	31
US Billboard Modern Rock Tracks	14
