= Enlarged to Show Detail 2 =

2001 film

- Cover of DVD
- Directed by: Carter B. Smith
- Produced by: T.K. Knowles; John O'Grady; Chuck Ryant
- Starring: Nick Hexum; Tim Mahoney; Doug Martinez; Chad Sexton; Aaron Wills
- Cinematography: Jo Molitoris
- Music by: Nick Hexum; Tim Mahoney; Doug Martinez; Chad Sexton; Aaron Wills; Shaquille O'Neal
- Distributed by: BMG Music
- Release date: December 11, 2001 (U.S.)
- Running time: 120 min.
- Country: United States
- Language: English

Enlarged to Show Detail 2 (full title: 311: Enlarged to Show Detail 2, a.k.a. E.T.S.D.2) is the second documentary by the band 311, and the sequel to Enlarged to Show Detail (1996). This is their second video documenting their experiences as a band promoting what they consider to be peace and a positive outlook on life. The video carries a Parental Advisory due to explicit lyrics and large display of adult content.

Enlarged to Show Detail 2 was certified as a Gold selling video by the RIAA.

== Track listings ==
=== Disc 1 (DVD) ===
1. Intro 2:25
2. 3-11 Day 6:00
3. The Hive 1:56
4. Tim Mahoney 2:03
5. 311 in Japan 3:23
6. Nick Hexum 2:44
7. 311 Milk Challenge 4:05
8. Old School 1:41
9. SA Martinez 6:58
10. Tolerance 7:24
11. Halloween 1:38
12. Chad Sexton 2:40
13. Weenie Roast 3:21
14. P-Nut 3:39
15. Small Venues 7:28
16. The Fans 1:50
17. Management & Crew 7:39

=== Disc 2 (Bonus CD EP) ===
Cover of Bonus EP included with DVD

1. Dancehall
2. Bomb the Town
3. Will The World (Interlude)
4. We Do It Like This
5. Dreamland (Interlude)
6. I'll Be Here Awhile (Acoustic Version)
