= Enlarged to Show Detail =

2001 film

- Starring: 311
- Music by: 311
- Production company: Bmg/Volcano/Capricorn
- Release dates: November 5, 1996 (VHS); December 11, 2001 (DVD)
- Language: English

Enlarged to Show Detail is a 1996 documentary created by the multi-genred band 311. The set contains a documentary (first released on VHS in 1996 and in 2001 on DVD) and a bonus CD EP. This was the first video documenting their experiences as a band promoting peace and a positive outlook on life. It features backstage footage, clips of music videos and live concert footage.

Enlarged to Show Detail was certified as a Platinum selling video by the RIAA.

== Bonus CD EP ==
Cover of Bonus CD EP

The second disc is a CD EP that includes the following tracks that are studio outtakes from the band's self-titled third album. It was produced by the band and Ron Saint Germain.

1. Tribute 4:16
2. Let The Cards Fall 3:27
3. Gap 2:10
4. Firewater 3:32
