= Transistor (311 album) =

Studio album by 311
- Released: August 5, 1997
- Recorded: February–April 1997
- Studio: NRG (Los Angeles)
- Genres: Reggae rock; alternative rock; dub; space rock; stoner rock
- Length: 66:11
- Label: Capricorn
- Producers: 311; Scotch Ralston

311 chronology
311 (1995)	Transistor (1997)	Omaha Sessions (1998)

Singles from Transistor
- 1. "Transistor" Released: June 30, 1997; 2. "Prisoner" Released: 1997; 3. "Beautiful Disaster" Released: December 13, 1997

Transistor is the fourth studio album by American rock band 311, released on August 5, 1997, by Capricorn Records. The album saw a change in musical style as fewer songs feature rapping in comparison to the band's previous albums. Intended as a double album, 311 opted to release the album on a single CD in order to make it more affordable to their fans.

Upon its release, Transistor received largely mixed reviews from critics, who felt it was overlong and self-indulgent. Retrospectively, however, the album has been more positively received, and was certified platinum by the RIAA.

== Music ==
Transistor is 67:59 in length, with twenty-one music tracks; it was originally intended to be a double album, but all songs were instead placed onto one disc. In a 1997 interview with Billboard, drummer Chad Sexton said that the band had recorded 29 songs for the album, but decided to cut the album's songs down to 21 to fit on a single CD instead of two (the vinyl release still featured two LPs) in order to make the release affordable to their fans. As 311 were only contracted for 11 songs, meaning they would not be paid for including any more songs, the band effectively gave away 10 of the album's songs for free. Nick Hexum admitted that doing too many songs in not enough time for Transistor was a mistake.

While still utilizing their alternative rock sound in many songs, Transistor saw 311 moving away from their hip hop-influenced sound of their previous albums for more of a reggae-influenced sound, as shown in songs such as "Prisoner", "Inner Light Spectrum", "Running", "Rub a Dub", and "Stealing Happy Hours". Although, their rap rock style is still present in some songs, such as "Galaxy", "No Control", "Tune In", "Starshines", and "Borders". Transistor also contains elements of dub, space rock and stoner rock.

== Reception ==
Professional ratings
Review scores
Source	Rating
AllMusic	2.5/5 stars
Entertainment Weekly	F
Los Angeles Times	2/4 stars
The Philadelphia Inquirer	3/4 stars
Rolling Stone	2/5 stars
The Rolling Stone Album Guide	2/5 stars
Spin	2/10
USA Today	2/4 stars
Wall of Sound	64/100

Transistor received a mixed review from AllMusic, who commented that "a project of this magnitude is almost doomed to fall on its face, and Transistor nearly does," and noted there were enough good songs for a 30 to 40 minute album, but had too much filler. They nominated the title track as the only Track Pick from the album. The album has received criticism from The A.V. Club, who says "With 21 songs spread out over 68 minutes, the record has taken plenty of critical punishment for its excessive length alone," and calls it a "joyless, tedious exercise in white-boy reggae, white-boy rap, white-boy dub and white-boy rock," concluding that the band could suffer a "Spin Doctors-style career combustion" in the future. Entertainment Weekly also panned the album, stating that it features "some of the weakest rhymes and derivative white-bread dub in recent memory" and concluded that the band did not know "the thin line between experimentation and self-indulgence". Rolling Stone criticized the album, saying it was "trying too hard to expand their sonic horizons", and commented how they seem to unwillingly change their musical style.

=== Retrospective reviews ===
In contrast, the album was retrospectively received positively by Consequence of Sound, comparing it to The Beatles' album Sgt. Pepper's Lonely Hearts Club Band, commenting that "the singles aren't what make Transistor great. It's the deep cuts that you play over and over again, trying to catch the meaning", they conclude that the album is "one of a kind". Over time, Transistor has developed a cult following and become a fan favorite, eventually leading to the band performing the album in its entirety on August 6, 2011, in front of over 10,000 fans. This was done at their very own Pow Wow Festival, created to commemorate the 14th anniversary of the album. In 2017, the Willamette Week ranked Transistor as 311's greatest album.

== Track listing ==
No.	Title	Lyrics	Music	Length
0.	"Transistor Intro" (instrumental, pregap hidden track)		Nick Hexum; Chad Sexton	1:36
1.	"Transistor"	Hexum; Doug "SA" Martinez	Sexton	3:01
2.	"Prisoner"	Hexum; Martinez	Hexum	2:50
3.	"Galaxy"	Martinez	Sexton	2:50
4.	"Beautiful Disaster"	Hexum	Hexum	3:58
5.	"Inner Light Spectrum"	Martinez	Martinez; Sexton	3:40
6.	"Electricity"	Hexum	Hexum	2:32
7.	"What Was I Thinking"	Hexum	Hexum	2:37
8.	"Jupiter"	Hexum; Martinez	Sexton	2:43
9.	"Use of Time"	Hexum	Hexum	4:24
10.	"The Continuous Life"	Martinez	Sexton	3:29
11.	"No Control"	Hexum; Martinez	Hexum	3:08
12.	"Running"	Martinez	Tim Mahoney	3:43
13.	"Color" (instrumental)		Sexton	1:54
14.	"Light Years"	Hexum	Hexum	2:26
15.	"Creature Feature"	Martinez	Aaron "P-Nut" Wills	2:36
16.	"Tune In"	Martinez	Sexton	2:16
17.	"Rub a Dub"	Hexum	Hexum	2:40
18.	"Starshines"	Hexum; Martinez	Sexton	2:36
19.	"Strangers"	Hexum	Hexum	2:40
20.	"Borders"	Martinez	Sexton	2:42
21.	"Stealing Happy Hours" (followed by the instrumental hidden track "Enter Space")	Hexum	Hexum	5:50
Total length:				66:11

Japanese release bonus track
No.	Title	Writer(s)	Length
22.	"Gap" (originally released on the Enlarged to Show Detail EP; Later included on the Archive compilation)	Hexum; Martinez	2:10
Total length:			68:21

- "Transistor Intro" is a hidden track that can be accessed by rewinding from the index of the first track by 1:36. Omitted from digital versions of Transistor, but released digitally on the Archive compilation.

Sample credits

- "Light Years" contains a sample of "I Wanna Be Black", written and performed by Michelle Clinton.
- "Strangers" contains a sample of "Hands on Experience", written by Milo Berger and Eric Meltzer, and performed by The High & Mighty.

=== Outtakes ===
All known outtakes from Transistor were released on the Archive compilation. The music of "Grifter" turned into "Long for the Flowers" on the 2005 album Don't Tread on Me. The original demo version leaked during the DTOM sessions. "The Quickening" is the only released 311 song that Doug "SA" Martinez wrote without any co-writers.

- "Grifter" (
  - Hexum
  - Martinez
  ) – 2:53
- "Writer's Block Party" (
  - Hexum
  - Martinez
  - Sexton
  - Wills
  ) – 2:54
- "Earth People" (
  - Martinez
  - Sexton
  ) – 2:20
- "The Quickening" (Martinez) – 2:23
- "Everything" (
  - Martinez
  - Sexton
  ) – 1:46
- "Old Funk" (Hexum) – 2:39
- "Space Funk" (Hexum) – 2:35
- "Lemming" (
  - Hexum
  - Sexton
  ) – 4:06

== Personnel ==
Credits adapted from album's liner notes.

311

- Nick Hexum – vocals (lead vocals on tracks 1, 2, 4, 6–9, 11, 14, 17–20, "Stealing Happy Hours," "Gap," "Grifter," "Writer's Block Party," "Lemming"), guitar, programming
- SA Martinez – vocals (lead vocals on tracks 2, 3, 5, 8, 10–12, 15, 16, 18, 20, "Gap", "Grifter", "Everything", "The Quickening", "Writer's Block Party", "Earth People"), scratches
- Chad Sexton – drums, percussion, programming
- Tim Mahoney – guitar
- Aaron Wills – bass

Additional musicians

- Eric "Bobo" Correa – percussion (on tracks 12, 19, 21)

Production

- 311 – producer
- Scotch Ralston – producer, engineer, mixing
- John Ewing Jr. – assistant engineer
- Wade Norton – technical support
- Joe Gastwirt – mastering

== Charts ==
=== Album ===
Chart	Peak position
US Billboard 200	4

=== Singles ===
Song	Chart	Peak position
"Transistor"	U.S. Billboard Modern Rock Tracks	14
"Transistor"	U.S. Billboard Mainstream Rock Tracks	31
"Beautiful Disaster"	U.S. Billboard Modern Rock Tracks	21
"Prisoner"	U.S. Billboard Modern Rock Tracks	21
