= Soundsystem (311 album) =

Studio album by 311
- Released: October 12, 1999
- Recorded: March 11 – June 1999
- Studio: The Hive (North Hollywood, California)
- Genres: Nu metal; funk rock; rap metal; alternative rock; reggae rock
- Length: 46:39
- Label: Capricorn
- Producers: 311; Hugh Padgham; Scotch Ralston

311 chronology
Live (1998)	Soundsystem (1999)	From Chaos (2001)

Singles from Soundsystem
- 1. "Come Original" Released: 1999; 2. "Flowing" Released: 1999; 3. "Large in the Margin" Released: 2000

Soundsystem is the fifth studio album by 311, released on October 12, 1999. Soundsystem, which was certified Gold by the RIAA, was the last 311 album on Capricorn Records before the band switched to Volcano Records in 2000. Recording processes for the album began on March 11, 1999.

== Reception ==
Professional ratings
Review scores
Source	Rating
AllMusic	3/5 stars
The Encyclopedia of Popular Music	4/5 stars
Entertainment Weekly	C
Hit Parader	B
Metal Hammer	8/10
Rolling Stone	2.5/5 stars
The Rolling Stone Album Guide	1.5/5 stars
Spin	5/10
Wall of Sound	72/100

"Soundsystem" was met with mostly mixed reviews from critics, with Rolling Stone discussing their mix of various genres, commenting "they offer their most ambitious fusion yet -- each track is a whirlwind tour of their soulful influences. Alas, the ingredients usually refuse to mix in 311's hands, resulting in disjunctions that veer between the bland and the unintentionally funny".

== Track listing ==
No.	Title	Lyrics	Music	Lead vocals	Length
1.	"Freeze Time"	Nick Hexum; Doug "SA" Martinez	Hexum	Nick Hexum with SA Martinez	3:22
2.	"Come Original"	Hexum; Martinez	Hexum; Aaron "P-Nut" Wills	Hexum with Martinez	3:43
3.	"Large in the Margin"	Hexum	Chad Sexton	Hexum with Martinez	3:27
4.	"Flowing"	Hexum	Hexum	Hexum	3:10
5.	"Can't Fade Me"	Hexum; Martinez	Hexum	Martinez with Hexum	2:09
6.	"Life's Not a Race"	Hexum; Martinez	Hexum; Tim Mahoney	Hexum with Martinez	4:25
7.	"Strong All Along"	Hexum; Martinez	Hexum	Hexum with Martinez	3:28
8.	"Sever"	Hexum; Martinez	Hexum; Wills	Hexum with Martinez	4:43
9.	"Eons"	Hexum	Sexton	Hexum	3:14
10.	"Evolution"	Hexum; Martinez	Hexum; Sexton	Martinez with Hexum	4:17
11.	"Leaving Babylon" (Bad Brains cover)	Gary Miller; Darryl Jenifer; Paul Hudson; Earl Hudson	Miller; Jenifer; P. Hudson; E. Hudson	Hexum	4:00
12.	"Mindspin"	Hexum; Martinez	Sexton	Hexum with Martinez	3:58
13.	"Livin' & Rockin'"	Hexum; Martinez	Mahoney	Hexum with Martinez	2:43
Total length:					46:39

B-Sides & Outtakes
No.	Title	Writer(s)	Lead vocals	Length
13.	"Blizza" (Available via 311 website)	Hexum	Hexum	1:16
14.	"Cali Soca" (Available via 311 website)	Hexum, Sexton	Instrumental	3:36
15.	"Dancehall" (Appears on the Enlarged to Show Detail 2 bonus EP)	Hexum, Martinez	Hexum with Martinez	2:51
16.	"Seal the Deal" (Available via 311 website)	Hexum	Hexum	3:22

== Personnel ==
Credits adapted from album’s liner notes.

311

- Nick Hexum – vocals, rhythm guitar, programming
- Chad Sexton – drums, percussion, programming
- Doug "S.A." Martinez – vocals, DJ
- Tim Mahoney – lead guitar
- Aaron "P-Nut" Wills – bass

Production

- Scotch Ralston – producer, engineer, mixing
- Hugh Padgham – producer, engineer
- Alex Rivera – assistant engineer
- Cameron Webb – assistant mix engineer
- Joe Gastwirt – mastering

== Charts ==
=== Album ===
Chart	Peak position	Certification	Sales
US Billboard 200	9	RIAA: Gold	

=== Singles ===
Song	Chart	Peak position
"Come Original"	U.S. Billboard Modern Rock Tracks	6
"Come Original"	U.S. Billboard Mainstream Rock Tracks	39
"Flowing"	U.S. Billboard Modern Rock Tracks	17
