= 311 (album) =

Studio album by 311
- Released: July 11, 1995
- Recorded: 1994–95
- Studio: NRG (Los Angeles)
- Genres: Alternative rock; rap rock; funk rock; reggae rock
- Length: 39:32
- Label: Capricorn
- Producers: Ron Saint Germain; 311

311 chronology
Grassroots (1994)	311 (1995)	Transistor (1997)

Singles from 311
- 1. "Don't Stay Home" Released: 1995; 2. "Down" Released: July 9, 1996; 3. "All Mixed Up" Released: February 1996

311 is the third studio album by American rock band 311, released on July 11, 1995, by Capricorn Records. The album contains the successful singles "Don't Stay Home", "All Mixed Up", and "Down", and was certified triple platinum with sales of over three million copies.

== Reception ==
Professional ratings
Review scores
Source	Rating
AllMusic	4/5 stars
The Encyclopedia of Popular Music	4/5 stars
The Rolling Stone Album Guide	2.5/5 stars

AllMusic's Peter Stepek was positive towards the album, saying "These riff-heavy and radio-ready songs are underscored by a tight drum sound (often with a piccolo snare), the scratching of turntables, and the crunch of heavy guitars: a formidable backdrop for this surprisingly melodic effort. The rhythms of reggae and ska percolate through this mix, and the harmonies of Nick Hexum and S.A. Martinez lend the band an edge not found in the majority of bands that feature rapping over rock beats." Rolling Stone says the album has "ear candy with good beats" and remarks that the band is "remarkably adept at genre juggling". They also noted the band's "Beasties-cum-Chili Peppers traits" and "a potent reggae undertow".

== Track listing ==
All lyrics are written by Nick Hexum and Doug "SA" Martinez, except where noted.

No.	Title	Lyrics	Music	Length
1.	"Down"		Hexum	2:52
2.	"Random"		Chad Sexton	3:05
3.	"Jackolantern's Weather"		Sexton	3:24
4.	"All Mixed Up"		Hexum	2:59
5.	"Hive"		Sexton; Hexum	2:58
6.	"Guns (Are for Pussies)"		Sexton	2:16
7.	"Misdirected Hostility"		Hexum	2:56
8.	"Purpose"	Hexum	Hexum	2:42
9.	"Loco"	Hexum	Tim Mahoney	1:53
10.	"Brodels"		Sexton	3:29
11.	"Don't Stay Home"	Hexum	Hexum	2:43
12.	"DLMD"		Hexum	2:11
13.	"Sweet"		Mahoney	3:15
14.	"T & P Combo"		Mahoney; Aaron "P-Nut" Wills	2:49
Total length:				39:32

30th anniversary edition bonus tracks (also included on the Archive compilation)
No.	Title	Writer(s)	Length
15.	"Tribute"	Hexum; Martinez; Sexton	4:16
16.	"Let the Cards Fall"	Hexum	3:27
17.	"Gap"	Hexum; Martinez	2:09
18.	"Firewater" (Slo-Mo)	Hexum; Martinez; Sexton	3:53
19.	"Outside"	Hexum; Martinez; Mahoney; Sexton	1:56
20.	"Juan Bond"	Hexum; Martinez; Sexton	2:49
21.	"Next"	Hexum	1:42
Total length:			57:35

- "Hive" interpolates lyrics of "It Takes Two" by Rob Base & DJ E-Z Rock, with interpolated lyrics written by Robert Ginyard.
- "Misdirected Hostility" was written in reference to the violence between the Phunk Junkeez and their back-up vocalist K-Tel Disco.
- ”Jackolantern’s Weather” was going to have a music video, released around Halloween, but the band declined because “they said they were tired.”
- The initial pressing of the album was distributed by "RED" and later re-pressed and distributed by Mercury Records in 1996 (note the tray card and disk updated with Mercury contact information and slightly washed out color on the disk front).

=== Outtakes ===
- "Who's Got the Herb?" (studio version available on the "Hempilation: Freedom Is NORML" compilation, live version available on the "Live" album)
- "Next (Instrumental)", "Sweet (Demo)" without SA's vocal and "Firewater" at its normal speed (leaked on the internet around '96). "Juan Bond", "Next", and "Firewater (Normal Speed)" were later officially released in 2015 on the 311 ARCHIVE box set.

== Personnel ==
- Nick Hexum – vocals, rhythm guitar
- Chad Sexton – drums, percussion
- Tim Mahoney – lead guitar
- P-Nut – bass
- S. A. Martinez – vocals, scratches (Credited as Count S.A.)

=== Production ===
- Ron Saint Germain – producer, recording, mixing
- 311 – producers
- Scott Ralston – recording, mixing
- John Ewing Jr. – assistant engineer
- Joe Gastwirt – mastering
- Mastered at Oceanview Studios
- Diane Painter – art direction
- Terry Robertson – design
- Catherine Wessel – photography

== Charts ==
=== Weekly charts ===
Chart (1995–1997)	Peak position
Australian Albums (ARIA)	93
US Billboard 200	12
US Heatseekers Albums (Billboard)	1

=== Year-end charts ===
Chart (1996)	Position
US Billboard 200	56

=== Singles ===
Year	Single	Chart	Position
1995	"Don't Stay Home"	Modern Rock Tracks	29
1996	"Down"	Hot 100 Airplay	37
1996	"Down"	Modern Rock Tracks	1
1996	"Down"	Mainstream Rock Tracks	19
1996	"All Mixed Up"	Hot 100 Airplay	36
1996	"All Mixed Up"	Modern Rock Tracks	4

== Certifications ==
Region	Certification	Certified units/sales
United States (RIAA)	3× Platinum	3,000,000^{^}
^{^} Shipments figures based on certification alone.
