= Ron Saint Germain =

- Also known as: Ron St. Germain; Ron Saint-Germaine
- Born: Frankfurt, Germany
- Origin: United States
- Occupations: Record producer; engineer; mixer; musician; singer

Ron Saint Germain (alternate spellings Ron St. Germain, Ron Saint-Germaine and similar) is an American record producer, audio engineer, and mixer born in post-war Frankfurt, Germany, into a career Air Force family.

Prior to his career in music production and engineering he was a musician, actor, and singer. Saint Germain's music business career spans over forty-five years. He began learning the art of recording at The Record Plant and Mediasound Studios in New York City. Some of his colleagues during those formative years were Tony Bongiovi, Bob Clearmountain, Harvey Goldberg, Mike Barbiero, Joe Gastwirt and Michael Brauer.

Since going independent as a producer, engineer and mixer in 1977 his work has amassed over 100 gold and platinum awards, selling well over a quarter billion units, garnering 19 Grammy nominations with 14 wins and numerous American Music and MTV Awards for the artists he has worked with. He has also mixed live and recorded in venues from CBGB to the 1980 Winter Olympics, Ronald Reagan’s Inauguration Ceremonies and the John F. Kennedy Center for the Performing Arts.

Among some of the most notable artists he has worked with are Jimi Hendrix, Aretha Franklin, Whitney Houston, Diana Ross, Michael Jackson, Smokey Robinson, Ashford & Simpson, Mick Jagger, U2, Muse, Bad Brains, Living Colour, 311, Tool, Soundgarden, Sonic Youth, Creed, The Cure, Ziggy Marley, the Red Hot Chili Peppers, Foreigner, Kraftwerk, Duran Duran, Nels Cline, Ornette Coleman, McCoy Tyner, Jackie McLean, Ben Goldberg, Kris Davis, Craig Taborn, The Last Poets and numerous others.

A large portion of Saint Germain's creative works can be found in motion picture film soundtracks. His works can also be found with 'A Moment In Time' (amomentintimefilms.com) company; a documentary film & production company showcasing varying film, musical & photographic works. Saint Germain continues his work traveling wherever it takes him, but does his mixing work at his private studio, Saint’s Place.

== Discography ==
- I Against I by Bad Brains
- Quickness by Bad Brains
- Goo by Sonic Youth
- Stain by Living Colour
- 311, From Chaos, Evolver, Don't Tread On Me, 311 Day 2006 (T.V. Special in 5.1) by 311
- Cruzential by Kashmir
- El Cielo by Dredg

He has had over 30 number 1 dance remixes (many with mixing partner Francois Kevorkian) such as "Hot Hot Hot!!!" and "Why Can't I Be You?" from the album Galore by The Cure, "Lucky in Love" and "Just Another Night" from the album She's the Boss by Mick Jagger, "Solid" from the album Solid by Ashford & Simpson.

Artists he has worked with include:

- Twiddle
- Nels Cline
- Muse
- Bad Brains
- 311
- Tool
- Soundgarden
- U2
- Sonic Youth
- Mick Jagger
- Creed
- Living Colour
- Foreigner
- The Cult
- Terence Trent D'Arby
- Joydrop
- DMC
- Mos Def
- Breed 77
- Fishbone
- Alien Ant Farm
- Jimi Hendrix
- Red Hot Chili Peppers
- Killing Joke
- Kraftwerk
- Whitney Houston
- Diana Ross
- Michael Jackson
- Smokey Robinson
- Ashford & Simpson
- Nona Hendryx
- Chaka Khan
- Al Jarreau
- Kool and the Gang
- Fatback
- Jimmy Castor Bunch
- Jean Michel Jarre
- Ziggy Marley
- Phillip Bailey & Phil Collins
- Jan Hammer
- Ornette Coleman
- McCoy Tyner
- Dexter Gordon
- Steven Stills
- Scott Stapp
- Lou Reed
- Warren Zevon
- Buffalo Tom
- Face to Face
- Boy Hits Car
- Pepper
- Michael Bolton
- Dan Hartman
- Modern West
- Rupert Holmes
- Steve Earl
- Snuff
- Damien Saez
- Keziah Jones
- Ric Ocasek
- Cat Stevens
- Paquito D'Rivera
- Ronald Shannon Jackson
- Bobby Previte
- Tim Berne
- Joey Baron
- Paul Motian
- Jim Black
- Dan Weiss
- Bill Frisell
- Kris Davis
- Craig Taborn
- Uri Caine
- Hank Roberts
- Barbara Sukowa & the X Patsy's
- The Last Poets
- Mark Dresser
- Ingrid Laubrock
- Chris Lightcap
- Ben Goldberg
- Ron Miles
- Cory Smythe
- Marc Ribot's Ceramic Dog
- Stephan Crump
- Jalal Mansur Nuriddin
- Stuwart Matthewman
- Steven Triantafillis
- Dave Eggar
- Chuck Palmer
- Daniel Sadownick
- David Fiuczynski
- Damien Saez
- No One is Innocent
- Brian Druxx
- The Buck Pets
- Souls at Zero (Formerly Wrathchild America)
