= List of British blues musicians =

This is an incomplete list of British blues bands and musicians.

== Individuals ==
- Ian A. Anderson
- Elles Bailey
- Ginger Baker
- Long John Baldry
- Chris Barber
- Norman Beaker
- Jeff Beck
- Duster Bennett
- Graham Bond
- Marcus Bonfanti
- John Bonham
- Geoff Bradford
- Jack Broadbent
- Jack Bruce
- Danny Bryant
- Eric Burdon
- Eric Clapton
- Joe Cocker
- Mike Cooper
- Cyril Davies
- John Dummer
- Aynsley Dunbar
- Chris Farlowe
- Mick Fleetwood
- Peter Green
- Nicky Hopkins
- Mick Jagger
- Brian Jones
- Laurence Jones
- Paul Jones
- Jo Ann Kelly
- Dave Kelly
- Danny Kirwan
- Alexis Korner
- Paul Kossoff
- Hugh Laurie
- Alvin Lee
- Aynsley Lister
- Bernie Marsden
- John Mayall
- Chantel McGregor
- Scott McKeon
- Tony McPhee
- Christine McVie
- John McVie
- Micky Moody
- Gary Moore
- Billy Nicholls
- Jimmy Page
- Robert Palmer
- Ottilie Patterson
- Ben Poole
- Duffy Power
- Rod Price
- Chris Rea
- Keith Relf
- Keith Richards
- Paul Rodgers
- Matt Schofield
- Todd Sharpville
- Innes Sibun
- Kim Simmonds
- Jeremy Spencer
- Chris Stainton
- Trevor Babajack Steger
- Rod Stewart
- Mick Taylor
- Joanne Shaw Taylor
- Top Topham
- Snowy White
- Dani Wilde

== Bands ==
- The Animals
- Back Door Slam
- The Birds
- Black Cat Bones
- The Blues Band
- Blues Incorporated
- Bluesology
- Chicken Shack
- Climax Blues Band
- Cream
- Downliners Sect
- Dr. Feelgood
- Fleetwood Mac
- Foghat
- Free
- The Groundhogs
- The Hamsters
- Jeff Beck Group
- The Jimi Hendrix Experience
- John Mayall & the Bluesbreakers
- Juicy Lucy
- Keef Hartley Band
- King King
- Led Zeppelin
- Love Sculpture
- Manfred Mann
- Medicine Head
- The Original Rabbit Foot Spasm Band
- Peter Green Splinter Group
- The Poets
- The Pretty Things
- The Rolling Stones
- Savoy Brown
- Spencer Davis Group
- Starlite Campbell Band
- Steamhammer
- The Steampacket
- Taste
- Ten Years After
- Them
- Tramp
- Twice as Much
- The Yardbirds
- When Rivers Meet
- Whitesnake
- Wishbone Ash
