= Ian Parker =

Ian Parker may refer to:

- Ian Parker (keyboardist) (born 1953), Scottish keyboard player
- Ian Parker (Canadian pianist) (born 1978)
- Ian Parker (singer-songwriter) (born 1976, English singer-songwriter and guitarist
- Ian Parker (psychologist) (born 1956), British psychologist
- Kim Ian Parker (born 1956), Canadian religious studies scholar
