= Hop Wilson =

American Texas blues guitarist

- Also known as: Hop Wilson, Poppa Hop
- Born: Harding Wilson; April 27, 1921; Grapeland, Texas, United States
- Died: August 27, 1975 (aged 54) Houston, Texas, United States
- Genres: Texas blues
- Occupations: Guitarist, singer
- Instruments: Steel guitar, harmonica
- Years active: 1950s–1975
- Labels: Ivory, Goldband

Harding "Hop" Wilson (April 27, 1921 – August 27, 1975) was an American Texas blues steel guitar player. Wilson gained the nickname "Hop" as a devolution of "Harp" due to his constant playing of a harmonica as a child. His low sounding playing gave several of his tracks, even "Merry Christmas Darling", a morose, disillusioned feel.

== Early life ==
Wilson was born in Grapeland, Texas, in 1921, learning to play guitar and harmonica at an early age. Acquiring his first steel guitar sometime between the age of 12 and 18, Wilson performed at various Houston clubs. He served in the United States Army and became a private first class. After serving in the Army, Wilson decided to pursue a musical career.

== Music career ==
Wilson began his career performing with drummer Ivory Lee Semien and bassist "Ice Water" Jones in the 1950s, recording tracks in 1957 for Goldband Records in Lake Charles, Louisiana. He was described as having "absorbed not only the black Texas blues as sung and played by the likes of Blind Lemon Jefferson but also the heavily amplified, often wildly distorted, steel guitar sounds of the region's white Western Swing bands."

In 1960, Wilson signed with Ivory Records in Houston. Wilson led recording sessions, but despised touring, and only played locally until his death in Houston in 1975.

== Influence ==
While Wilson's recording career has been characterized as "slight", he did have an influence on a variety of musicians, including Ron Wood of the Rolling Stones, who stated in 1994 "There's another guitar player called Hop Wilson. I got songs that I wrote like 'Black Limousine' from him, those kinds of licks".

Peter Green, founder of Fleetwood Mac, interviewed in 2007 discussing his favourite blues artists, stated "then there's Hop Wilson, a slide guitar player from Houston who used a twin-neck lap steel. He recorded a couple of singles calling himself Pap Hop and wrote the song "Black Cat Bone". I love his album Texas Steel Guitar Flash."

Wilson's song "My Woman Has A Black Cat Bone" was recorded by Albert Collins, Johnny Copeland and Robert Cray as "Black Cat Bone" on their 1985 combined release Showdown!, released through Alligator Records. Their recording features a spoken introduction where Copeland and Collins discussed Wilson started by Copeland as follows:

"Tell me something, Albert: what ever happened to Hop Wilson, man?"
"Well, Hop left us, man"
"He did, Albert"
"Boy he sure played that guitar over at the Red Lily Cube"
"Yeah, he laid that steel in his lap, he'd be gettin' down"
"I used to like the way he said..." (song begins).

"Black Cat Bone" has since become a popular blues standard, and has been recorded by numerous contemporary blues artists including Matt Schofield, The Nimmo Brothers and Philipp Fankhauser.

== Discography ==
- Blues With Friends At Goldband (Goldband LP: 1981)
- Steel Guitar Flash! (Ace LP: 1988; Ace CD: 1994)
