= Erja Lyytinen =

Finnish musician and songwriter

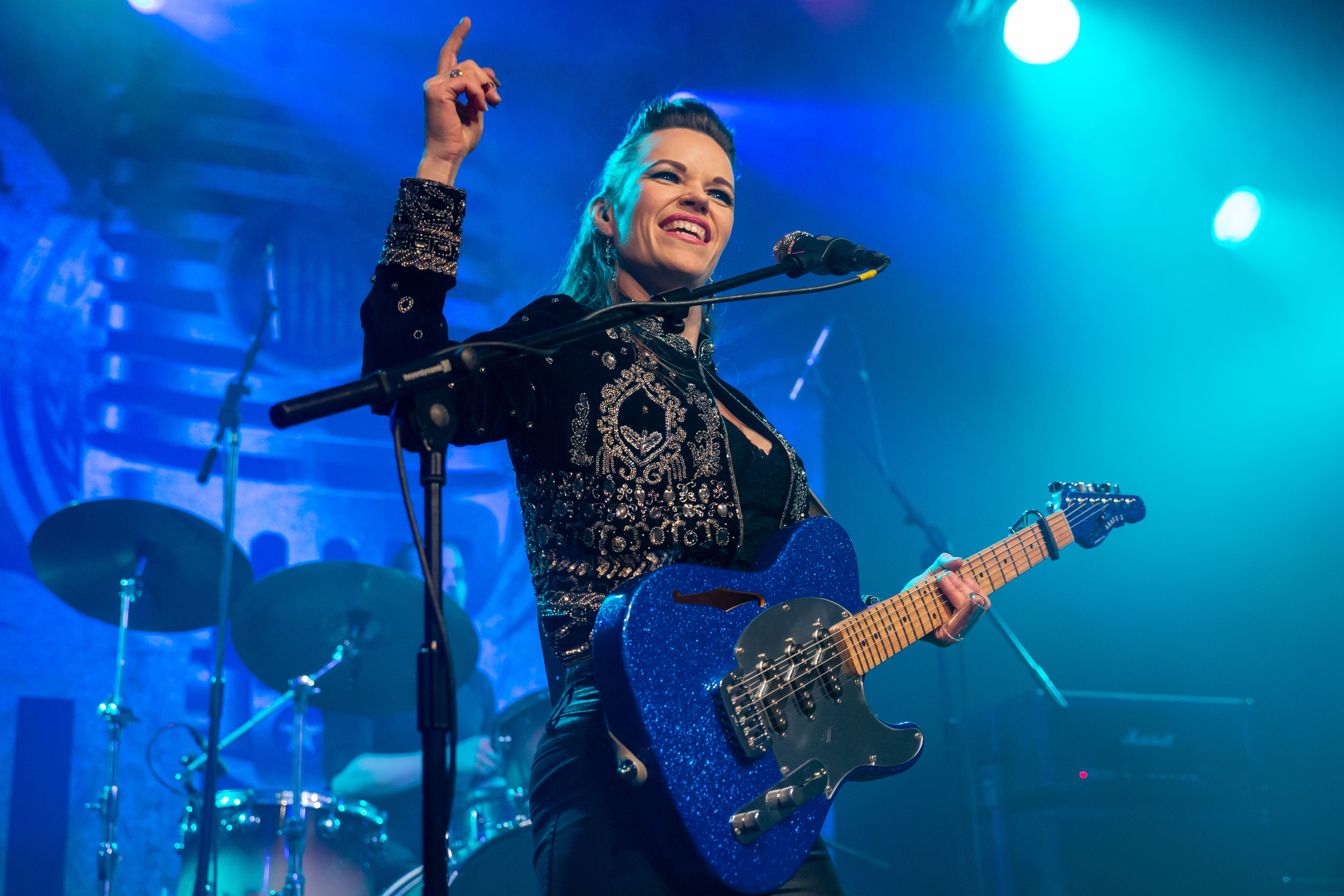
- Erja Lyytinen performing at HRH Blues at the O2 Academy Sheffield, 2019

Background information
- Born: 7 July 1976 (age 50); Kuopio, Finland
- Genre: Blues
- Occupations: Musician, singer-songwriter
- Instruments: Vocals, guitar
- Years active: 2002–present
- Labels: Tuohi Records, Ruf Records
- Website: erjalyytinen.com

Erja Lyytinen (born 7 July 1976 in Kuopio, Finland) is a Finnish vocalist, guitarist, and songwriter.

== Youth, studies and influences ==
Erja Lyytinen began playing the guitar when she was 15 years old. Around the same time, she started writing her own songs. In high school, she performed with various projects, one of them being a soul-influenced Brothers & Sisters band, in which she was the singer. At the time she was influenced heavily by artists like Aretha Franklin and Ray Charles. Later she found the music of Koko Taylor, and she mentions one of her favourite songs from Taylor was the piece "I'm A Woman" from The Earthshaker album. She also mentions Bonnie Raitt as a great influence.

Throughout 1997 Lyytinen spent a year in Sweden studying in Malmö Musikhögskolan as an exchange student. She returned to Finland to study music education at Sibelius Academy. At the time she was the first woman to study electric guitar as a major at that institution.

Lyytinen took part in Finland's MTV3 channel's series called Kulkuri ja Kaunottaret (The Rover and The Beauties) in 1999. There she worked as a bandleader and as a lead guitarist. The music on the program was mainly based around the style of Finnish schlager music. Many famous Finnish artists of that genre performed on the series.

Attention!, Lyytinen's first album was published with "Dave's Special" band in 2002. The songs on the album were mostly danceable jump and swing blues numbers and were for the most part written by Lyytinen herself.

Throughout her career Lyytinen has been the opening act for Robert Plant, Focus and Tom Jones, and played with Joe Bonamassa, Jennifer Batten, Sonny Landreth and Carlos Santana, among others.

== 2000–2010: Career beginnings and going international ==
On 10 November 2002 Lyytinen was the opening act for Robert Plant, the former vocalist of Led Zeppelin. She has mentioned that the occasion is one of her treasured concert memories.

Erja Lyytinen was the only Finnish act to perform at "Puistoblues" in 2003, the biggest blues festival in Finland, where she played on the main stage. Her second album Wildflower was released at the festival. The artists Koko Taylor and Bonnie Raitt, two of her biggest influences and idols, also performed at the festival, and Lyytinen had the chance to meet Bonnie Raitt there.

At the time Lyytinen balanced between touring and studying at the Sibelius Academy. Later on, in 2003 she went to study abroad in Denmark. In Kobenhavn Rytmisk Musikkonservatorium she studied with Paul Banks, jazz guitarist Jacob Ficher, singer Etta Cameron, and with guitarist Billy Cross, who had played with Bob Dylan.

In the spring of 2003, Lyytinen was awarded a stipend to attend the Musician's Institute of Technology in Los Angeles. There she got to study with Scott Henderson, who has played in Chick Corea's Electric Band, and with Keith Wyatt who, according to her, kept amazing lectures about the history of blues.

Thomas Ruf from the German Ruf Records label brought his Blues Caravan tour to Finland in 2005. There Lyytinen got to jam with female blues artists Candye Kane, Ana Popovic and Sue Foley, who at the time had contracts with Ruf Records. After that Ruf offered a record deal to Lyytinen which led to recording her international debut album, "Pilgrimage". The album was recorded in Memphis and Mississippi with two other artists, Aynsley Lister and Ian Parker.

In 2006 Lyytinen had a chance to record her next album Dreamland Blues in Oxford, Mississippi with local musicians. On this record, her playing is more slide guitar-oriented than on earlier albums. In Finland, the album was picked as the "Album of the Year" by Bluesministeri (The Bluesminister) radio show, which was broadcast on YLE (Finnish public service media company). In the same year, Lyytinen also toured with the Blues Caravan.

The Grip of the Blues album was released in 2008. Lyytinen has mentioned that she think of this record as her first "real" album as it was the first record to feature her own band. The line-up for the album was Rami Eskelinen (drums), Iiro Kautto (bass), and Davide Floreno (guitar).

At the beginning of 2009 Lyytinen toured again with "Ruf's Blues Caravan". Other artists on that tour were Joanne Shaw Taylor and Oli Brown. In Norway at the Notodden Blues Festival the trio got to jam with Joe Bonamassa, with whom they played the song "Further Up On The Road".

== 2010–2018: Awards and career highlights ==
On the album Voracious Love, which was released in 2010, Lyytinen continued to push her musical boundaries. On the song "Bed of Roses", she collaborated with the singer Marko Hietala, known from the bands Nightwish and Tarot, and with Paavo Lötjönen from Apocalyptica.

In late 2010, Lyytinen toured for five weeks with her band in Sweden, Denmark, Germany, Switzerland, and England. In England, she was the opening act for Walter Trout.

Later in the same year, Lyytinen graduated from Sibelius Academy with a master of music degree.

Throughout 2011 Lyytinen toured extensively in Britain. The tour consisted of 11 shows around the country. She also made an appearance on the "Blues Show" with Paul Jones on BBC Radio 2, where she performed the songs "Don't Let a Good Woman Down", "Oil and Water", and the Blind Willie Johnson cover "The Soul of a Man". At the time the line-up for the band was Roger Inniss (bass), Miri Miettinen (drums), and Davide Floreno (guitar).

In late 2012, Lyytinen participated in the Finnish version of the Strictly Come Dancing TV show. The show was broadcast on MTV3.

Her album Forbidden Fruit was released in 2013. The songs "Joyful Misery" and "At Least We Still Fight" were written in collaboration with Alan Darby, who has performed with Eric Clapton and Paul McCartney and wrote music for Bonnie Raitt.

In 2014, Lyytinen released the album The Sky is Crying, which was a tribute to the music of Elmore James. This more blues-oriented record turned out to be her breakthrough album on which she proved her skills as a slide guitarist. The Canadian "Underground Blues Network" chose the album as "The Best European Blues Album of the Year" and as "The Best Tribute Album". The British Blues Matters! magazine placed it amongst the three best international albums of the year and honoured her by placing her second on "The International Solo Artist" chart.

In 2015, following the release of the Live in London concert album, which was recorded at The 100 Club in London, Lyytinen was voted the number one International Solo Artist by Blues Matters!. She was also awarded "The Artist of the Year" title in the Finnish Blues Awards.

The Stolen Hearts album was released in 2017. The record was produced by Chris Kimsey. In Finland Lyytinen toured extensively with the guitarist/actor Heikki Silvennoinen in sold-out venues and performed in India for the first time. That was followed by two successful tours in England and her first "Blue Christmas" tour in Finland.

== European blues awards ==
In 2017 Lyytinen was voted as "The Best Guitarist of the Year" in the European Blues Awards. She also took part in "Tähdet, Tähdet" (Stars, Stars), a competitive music entertainment TV show on Finland's MTV3.

== Jamming with Carlos Santana ==
Lyytinen performed with Carlos Santana in front of 20,000 people at Kaisaniemi, Helsinki in 2018. "My new friend represents the future – and I like the future! Erja… I call her lightning! Lightnin' Hopkins, you know" Santana announced when inviting her on stage, thus giving her a new moniker "Lightning".

A highlight preceding the Kaisaniemi, concert was on New Year's Eve when Lyytinen played in front of over 80,000 people at TV channel YLE's "New Year's Eve Concert". The concert was also broadcast nationwide in Finland.

== 2019: Another World and debut biography "The Blues Queen" ==
The Another World album was released in 2019. The album combined influences from blues, rock, pop, funk and progressive rock. Jennifer Batten, former guitarist for Michael Jackson, and Sonny Landreth performed on the album. The album was mixed in Texas by Chris Bell and mastered by Gavin Lursen in Los Angeles.

Later in the same year, Lyytinen performed in Canada with Downchild Blues Band, and with the actor Dan Aykroyd. In August she was the opening act for Tom Jones at his concerts in Naantali and Oulu, Finland.

Throughout June and July 2019, Guitar World asked their online readers for their opinions in its '30 best blues guitarists in the world today' poll. More than 60,000 votes were cast between the site's list of nominees and following the completion of the competition, Lyytinen was ranked 14th.

On 21 November 2019, Lyytinen was bestowed the prestigious "Savonmuan Hilima" award by the Savon Sanomat newspaper. The announcement was made on the front page of the aforementioned publication on the same day. The previous winners have included notable designers, artists, researchers, classical singers and so on coming from the Savolax area in the Eastern-part of Finland. The award carries a long tradition, but Lyytinen was the first recipient to represent the popular music genre. Along with the award came a trophy designed by local designer-artist Ritva-Liisa Pohjalainen. The trophy is called "The Balance" and is made from black and white glass.

Lyytinen's autobiography called Blueskuningatar (The Blues Queen) was released in Finland in November 2019.

Her solo on "Bad Seed" was voted by Guitar World readers as the 10th best guitar solo of 2022.

== Discography ==
=== Studio albums ===
- Attention! (2002)
- Wildflower (2003)
- Pilgrimage – Mississippi to Memphis (with Aynsley Lister and Ian Parker, 2005)
- It's a Blessing (with Davide Floreno, 2005)
- Dreamland Blues (2006)
- Grip of the Blues (2008)
- Voracious Love (2010)
- Forbidden Fruit (2013)
- The Sky Is Crying (2014)
- Stolen Hearts (2017)
- Another World (2019)
- Waiting For the Daylight (2022)
- Smell The Roses (2025)

=== Live albums ===
- Songs from the Road (2012)
- Live In London (2015)
- Lockdown Live 2020 (2020)
- Diamonds on the Road - Live 2023 (2023)

== Honours and awards ==
- European Blues Awards: Best Guitarist 2017
- Finnish Blues Awards: Best Artist 2016
- Bluesmatters: International Artist 2016
- Independent Blues Broadcasters Association (UK): Live In London #1 IBBA Chart June 2015
- Canada's Blues Underground Network: Sky Is Crying Best Tribute Album 2014
- Canada's Blues Underground Network: Sky Is Crying Best European Blues Album 2014
- Savon Sanomat newspaper: "Savonmuan Hilima" award 2019

== DVDs ==
- Ruf's Blues Caravan – The New Generation (with Aynsley Lister and Ian Parker, 2006)
- Songs From The Road
- Live In London
