= Rebecca Downes =

- Born: Wolverhampton, England
- Genres: Blues rock
- Occupations: Singer, guitarist, songwriter, vocal coach
- Instrument: Vocals
- Years active: 2010s–present
- Website: Official website

Rebecca Downes is an English blues rock singer, guitarist, songwriter and vocal coach. Since 2013, she has released five studio albums, one live album and one mini-album. In 2016, Downes was voted 'Best Female Vocalist' and 'Best Emerging Artist' at the British Blues Awards.

== Life and career ==
She was born in Wolverhampton, England, and began performing at the age of 13, and later started to write her own songs. She attended Staffordshire University where she studied Fine Art and Art History before taking up full-time employment. She still performed in her spare time. Downes used Mark Viner Stuart of Mad Hat Studios as her mentor and, by 2011, she had been partnered by Steve Birkett to assist in song writing and inspiration. Her initial recordings appeared on a mini-album, Real Life, which was released in 2013. By this stage Downes had changed to part-time work as a vocal coach, to allow her more time to record and perform. In 2014, Back to the Start was issued as her debut album. She played at the Skegness Rock and Blues Festival in 2015, returning the following year when billed as a main act. Her second album, Believe, was produced by Mark Viner Stuart and issued in February 2016. The collection comprised 13 songs all penned by Downes and Birkett. In 2016, Downes was voted 'Best Female Vocalist' and 'Best Emerging Artist' at the British Blues Awards, and she won 'Female Blues Vocalist of the Year' in the UK Blues Awards in 2018.

Downes performed at various live venues and acted as the support act for King King, Dr. Feelgood and Paul Carrack. Her concert performances where captured on the live album, BeLive (2017). Downes was named as the UK Blues Federation's 'Female Vocalist of the Year' at Worthing and was presented with the award at her concert in Fleet, Hampshire, on 1 June 2018. On 24 May 2019, Downes released her third full studio album, More Sinner Than Saint. Creation of the recording was assisted by Chris Kimsey, who stood in as consultant. The album was mixed by Thunder's Chris Childs and Bill Drescher, and featured guest guitarist appearances by Alan Nimmo from King King and Magnum's Tony Clarkin. More Sinner Than Saint contained 12 Downes and Birkett compositions. In 2020, Downes released a version of Slade's "Mama Weer All Crazee Now", in a way that reflected the nation's feelings during the COVID-19 pandemic in the United Kingdom. She also re-recorded the track "Wave Them Goodbye" from More Sinner Than Saint, in a duet version with Alan Nimmo of King King.

On 9 April 2021, Downes next album, Stripped Back was released. The collection contained ten tracks from Believe and More Sinner Than Saint, each of them recorded in a different way, plus a couple of previously unreleased tracks. The pandemic's suspension of live music created an opportunity to revisit older material, with much of the recording taking place at each individual's home. Her fifth studio album, The Space Between Us, was released on 11 November 2022. The album contained 11 tracks, ten being written by Downes and Birkett with the other song a reworking of Free's "A Little Bit of Love". Most of the recording was undertaken separately, although the whole of Downes' backing ensemble joined in the studio when recording "Rattle My Cage".

On 25 November 2022, Downes performed at WinterStorm in Troon, Scotland.

== Discography ==
=== Albums ===
Year	Title	Record label
2013	Real Life (EP)	Self-released
2014	Back to the Start	2R2Records
2016	Believe	Mad Hat Records
2017	BeLive	Mad Hat Records
2019	More Sinner Than Saint	Mad Hat Records
2021	Stripped Back	Mad Hat Records
2022	The Space Between Us	Mad Hat Records
2025	Stranger Blue (EP)	Mad Hat Records
2025	A Storm Is Coming	Mad Hat Records
