= Laurence Jones (musician) =

- Born: 13 February 1992 (age 34); Liverpool, England
- Genres: Blues rock
- Occupations: Guitarist, singer-songwriter
- Instrument: Guitar
- Years active: 2010–present
- Labels: Ruf Records, Top Stop Music, Marshall Records
- Website: Official website

Laurence Jones (born 13 February 1992) is an English blues rock guitarist, and singer-songwriter. He has released four solo albums to date and is signed to Ruf Records. Jones has won four British Blues Awards, including 'Young Artist of the Year' for three consecutive years.

== Biography ==
Jones was born just outside Liverpool, England, and relocated with his family at the age of eight to Shipston-on-Stour, Warwickshire. He learned classical guitar from the age of seven, although he became inspired towards the blues by listening to his father's collection of vinyl records. His particular favourite was The Groundhogs, Split, which was released in March 1971. He acquired a Gibson Les Paul, practised for two hours each day, and by his mid-teens fronted his own cover band, Free Beer, which employed a female singer. He formed his own blues trio at the age of seventeen, and enrolled at University of Birmingham, but his final exams came around, Jones chose to go on tour with Johnny Winter and Walter Trout. In 2012, Jones signed a recording contract with Promise Records and they released his debut album, Thunder in the Sky. In the same year Jones was diagnosed with Crohn's disease. All bar one of the songs on Thunder in the Sky were written by Jones, except for his cover of "The Thrill Is Gone". He toured promoting the album and ultimately provided support for the Royal Southern Brotherhood, Wishbone Ash and another of his boyhood heroes, Tony McPhee of The Groundhogs.

In 2014, Jones signed with Ruf Records, and they released his second album, Temptation. It was recorded in Lafayette, Louisiana, United States. The album included contributions from Mike Zito on guitar and production work, plus the drummer Yonrico Scott and bassist Charlie Wooton (all three members of the Southern Brotherhood). Guest appearances included Johnny Sansone, Aynsley Lister and Walter Trout. The critical praise saw him pick up the 'Young Artist of the Year' title at the 2014 British Blues Awards. That summer, Jones toured as part of the Blues Caravan tour performing in ten European countries. Part of the tour was recorded and led to the release of Blues Caravan 2014, jointly credited to Laurence Jones, Albert Castiglia and Christina Skjolberg.

What's It Gonna Be (2015) was Jones next album released by Ruf Records. The songs were written about his touring experiences and travelling around the world. A British tour with King King followed. Among other venues, Jones appeared at New York City's Carnegie Hall. By 2016, Jones had secured four British Blues Awards, including 'Young Artist of the Year' for three consecutive years.

Take Me High (2016) was produced by Mike Vernon. It was launched at the Townsend Hall in Shipston-on-Stour, and preceded a tour across the UK plus an appearance at the Nidaros Blues Festival in Trondheim, Norway. In 2017, Jones supported Vintage Trouble on their UK tour, and later the same year toured with Kenny Wayne Shepherd in the UK and around mainland Europe.

== Accolades and awards ==
- 2014–2016: British Blues Awards : Young Artist of the Year
- 2016: British Blues Awards : Guitarist of the Year
- 2016: European Blues Awards : Best Guitarist 2015

Year	Organization	Accolade	Artist/work	Ranking	Source
2017	Pop Magazine	Best Albums of 2017	The Truth	15	

== Discography ==
Year	Title	Record label
2012	Thunder in the Sky	Promise Records
2014	Temptation	Ruf Records
2014	Blues Caravan 2014 (Live) with Christina Skjolberg & Albert Castiglia	Ruf Records
2015	What's It Gonna Be	Ruf Records
2016	Take Me High	Ruf Records
2017	The Truth	Top Stop Music
2019	Laurence Jones Band	Top Stop Music
2022	Destination Unknown	Marshall Records
2023	Bad Luck & the Blues	Marshall Records
2026	On My Own	Ron Records

== See also ==
- List of British blues musicians
