= Ben Poole =

British blues musician

- Genres: Blues rock
- Occupations: Guitarist, singer, songwriter
- Instruments: Guitar, vocals
- Years active: 2000s–present
- Label: Various
- Website: Official website

Ben Poole is a British blues rock guitarist, singer, and songwriter. One reviewer noted that "his music style is original and can be described as energetic blend of blues, pop, and rock and roll". Poole's musical ability has been lauded by Jeff Beck and Gary Moore.

== Life and career ==
Poole's father was a professional musician and there were several musical instruments in his household when Poole was growing up. However, from the age of nine, Poole was only interested in playing the guitar. He had a guitar tutor who encouraged Poole to play what he liked. Through this approach, Poole learned how to play Jimi Hendrix's "Voodoo Chile". Poole recalled that particular teacher "... made me want to sit down and play". He performed his first gig in a heavy metal subsequently noting "I guess when you're in school at that age you kind of fall into liking what all your friends are into. It takes a while to work out what you really like". When he later played in a three piece blues rock ensemble, his drummer decided to enlist at the British and Irish Modern Music Institute in Brighton, which made Poole drop the idea of doing a history degree, and concentrate instead on his fledgling musical career. He began to perform regularly building up a small fan base. His musicianship was such that he was named by Total Guitar magazine as 'the guitarist to watch out for in 2010'. The following year, Poole was nominated in three categories at the British Blues Awards. In 2012, Poole was chosen as the UK representative at the European Blues Challenge held in Berlin, where he came third out of 19 participating countries. That same year, Poole was voted '2012's Best Newcomer' by Blues Matters! magazine. Poole played "Hey Joe" at the Bluesmoose Festival in Groesbeek, Netherlands, in April 2012, where the performance became the most viewed video from the Festival. His debut album, Let's Go Upstairs, was self-released that same year. The album was produced by a Grammy Award winner, Isaac Nossel. On the recording, seven of the songs were Poole originals, two were co-writes with Nossel and three were versions of previous material, which included the Otis Redding/Steve Cropper penned song "Mr. Pitiful" and the Ann Peebles original "I'm Gonna Tear Your Playhouse Down".

Poole's next recording was the live album, Live at the Royal Albert Hall (2014). The album was released by Manhaton Records, the first of a trio of Poole albums on that label. Gary Moore called Poole "A really good guitar player!" and Jeff Beck once commented that he "Really loved his playing". In 2016, Poole issued his next release, Time Has Come, which included four tracks written by Poole among a total of 10 songs. On 14 September 2018, Poole released his next studio album, Anytime You Need Me. It was recorded at Superfly Studios in Ollerton, Nottinghamshire, and was produced by Wayne Proctor. Poole co-wrote the album with two writing partners, Proctor and Steve Wright. Poole commented "We basically locked ourselves away regularly over a period of around six months at a studio in the hills of North Wales writing and demoing the majority of the tunes on this album from scratch. It’s the first time I've worked in this way and, though it was challenging to force myself to conjure a creative mind-set on cue when in a room with two other songwriters whom I'd never written with before, I think the results are really rewarding". To support the album's release, Poole went on a 14-date UK tour in November and December 2018. Poole continued his work on the road, completing a 140-date, 19-country tour. In addition, Poole and his backing band have played at a number of music festivals such as Glastonbury Festival (UK), Download Festival (UK), Sierre Blues Festival (Switzerland), Culemborg Festival (Netherlands), and the Schoppingen Blues Festival (Germany).

In 2019, Poole undertook a recording schedule to complete his self-released live double album, Trio/// Live '19. The recording took place in England in July 2019 over three venues. These were the Old Schoolhouse in Barnsley, The Half Moon, Putney, and Bootleggers in Kendal. The album primarily contained the most popular cuts from his previous two albums, 2016's Time Has Come and 2018's Anytime You Need Me. Like many others, Poole's activities were then curtailed by the COVID-19 pandemic, which meant that he was grounded until restrictions lifted. He could plan a touring profile that included gigs in the UK, Canada, US, and all over Europe. He noted, "It's going to be fun to get back out there — doing the festivals again especially". In 2021, Poole issued another live album, although this time in an acoustic format and in conjunction with the Dutch bluesman, Guy Smeets. It was called Acoustic Duo Live

== Discography ==
=== Albums ===
Year	Title	Record label	Additional credits
2012	Let's Go Upstairs	Self-released	
2014	Live at the Royal Albert Hall	Manhaton Records	
2016	Time Has Come	Manhaton Records	
2018	Anytime You Need Me	Manhaton Records	
2019	Trio/// Live '19	Self-released	
2021	Acoustic Duo Live	Self-released	Ben Poole / Guy Smeets

== See also ==
- List of British blues musicians
