= Kim Parker =

Kim Parker may refer to:

- Kim Ian Parker (born 1956), Canadian religious studies scholar
- Kim Parker (character), a fictional character played by Countess Vaughn in Moesha and The Parkers
- Kim Parker (actress) (1932–2010), Austrian-born actress in British films, best known for Fiend Without a Face
