= Jack Broadbent =

Jack Broadbent may refer to:

- Jack Broadbent (rugby league)
- Jack Broadbent (musician)
