= Jo Harman =

British singer and songwriter (born 1983)

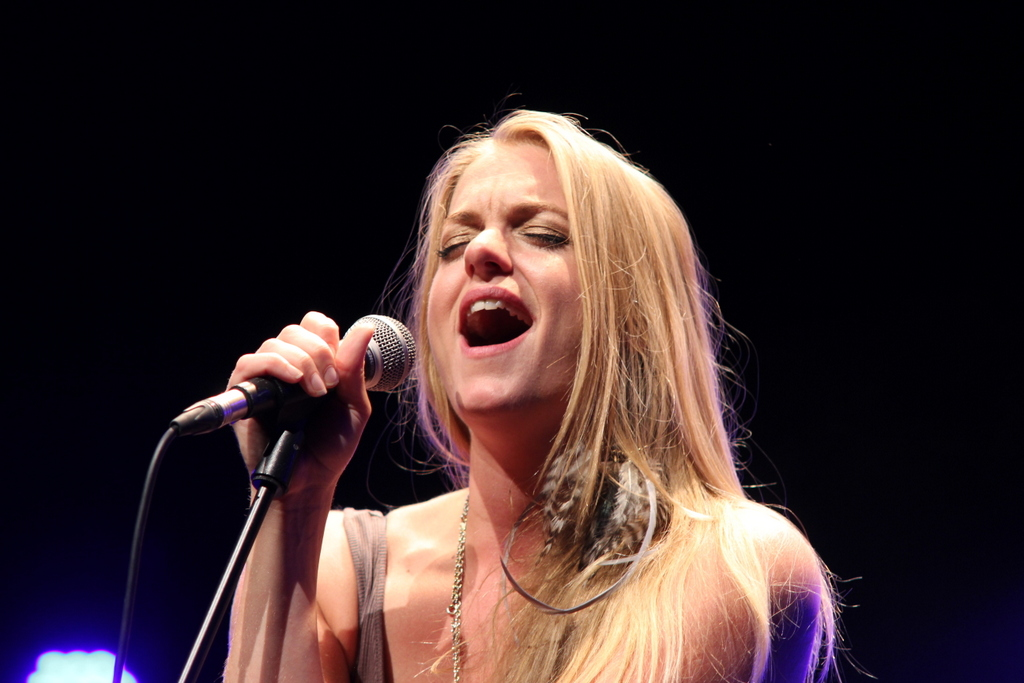
- Harman performing at the Newark Blues Festival in 2013

Background information
- Born: 21 September 1983 (age 42); Luton, England
- Genres: Blues; Soul
- Occupations: Singer, songwriter
- Years active: 2008–present
- Website: joharman.com

Jo Harman (born 21 September 1983) is an English blues and soul singer and songwriter.

Born in Luton, England, Harman grew up in the Devon village of Lustleigh, before moving to London to study for a BA Theatre Arts. After travelling to India, following the death of her father, she attended Brighton Institute of Modern Music in Brighton. In 2011, she self-released Live at Hideaway, whilst she developed her songcraft toward making a debut studio album.

Harman's first gig in Europe was to 5,500 people opening for the Cranberries on Monday 5 November 2012 in Amsterdam . Her second album, Dirt on My Tongue, was released in 2013. Harman's song to her father, "Sweet Man Moses", was nominated as best composition at the 2012 British Blues Awards and this was followed by "Worthy of Love" being nominated in the same category the following year, together with a "Best Female Singer" nomination.

In 2014, she and her bandmates in "Jo Harman and Company" were nominated for seven British Blues Awards. She appeared at BluesFest where her performance was recorded by the BBC and released as a live album. Harman has worked with members of Average White Band.

In February 2017, she released her second studio album, People We Become. The first single from the album, "When We Were Young", featured backing vocals from Michael McDonald, and achieved BBC Radio 2 playlist status. The music video to 'The Reformation' was directed by Nick Donnelly

== Awards ==
- 2014 Female Vocalist of the Year by British Blues Awards
