= Red Dirt Skinners =

Anglo-Canadian multi-genre duo

- Origin: South East England
- Genres: Rock, acoustic, contemporary folk, progressive folk, folk rock
- Years active: 2011–present
- Members: Rob Skinner; Sarah Skinner
- Website: reddirtskinners.com

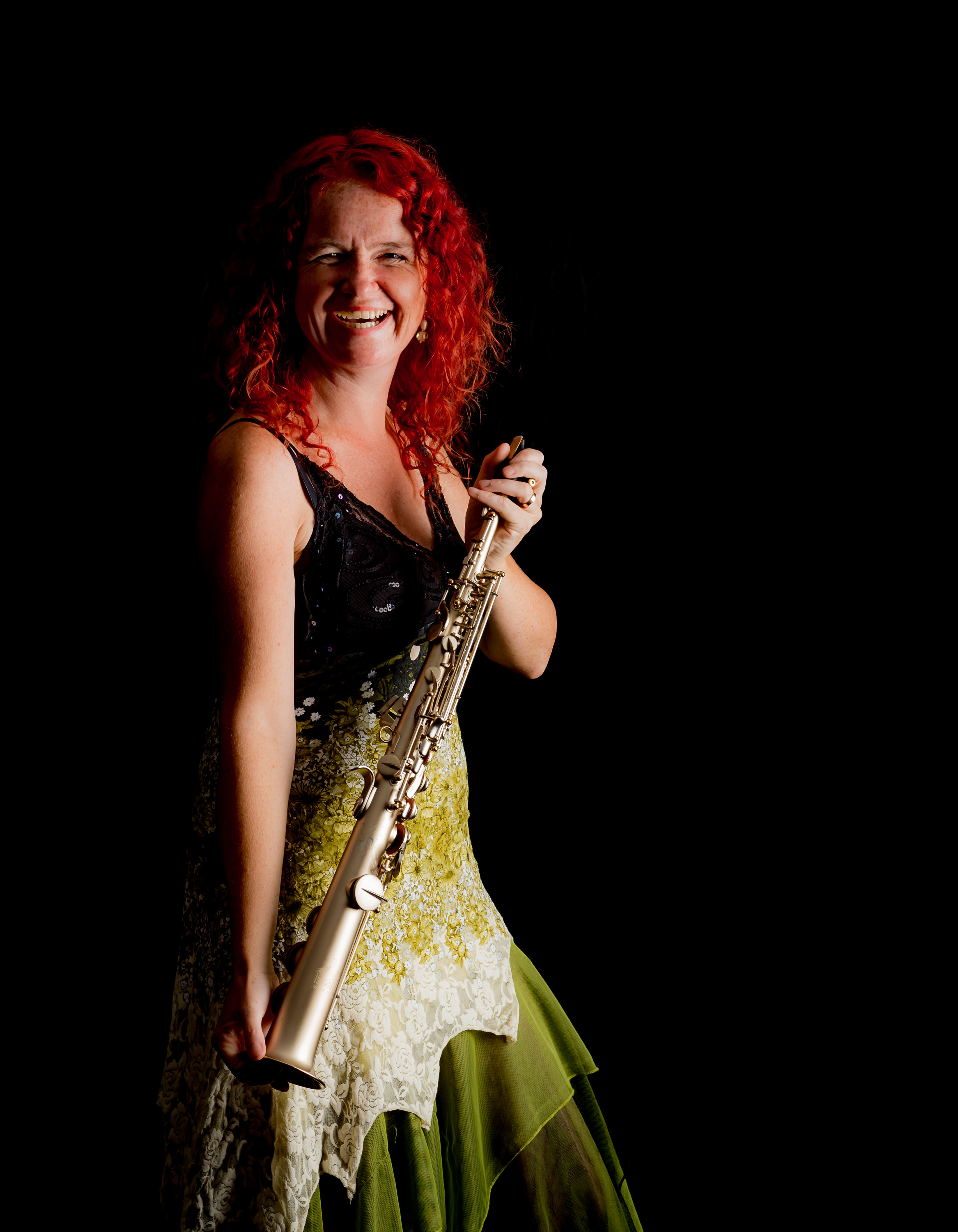
Sarah Skinner in 2017

The Red Dirt Skinners are an Anglo-Canadian multi-genre duo, who formed in 2011. The duo consists of Rob and Sarah Skinner, both multi-instrumentalists originating from South East England and now residing in Ontario, Canada.

== History ==
In 2012, the couple's home was the subject of a burglary. Home Sweet Home is a collection of songs written about the events of the weekend of the burglary. .

In 2013, the Red Dirt Skinners became the first band in history to succeed at both the British Blues Awards (Winner Instrumentalist of the Year 2014, Runner-up 2013)) and the British Country Music Awards (Horizon Act of the year and People's Choice). Since then they have been nominated at the International Acoustic Music Awards.

The Red Dirt Skinners released Sinking The Mary Rose in 2013 and subsequently Live in Aberdeen in 2014.

In 2014, Sarah Skinner became the first female artist to be endorsed by Trevor James Saxophones. Sarah remained with Trevor James for 7 years before progressing to a solid copper Rampone and Cazzani soprano in early 2022.

Their fifth album, Behind The Wheel, was voted in several polls as Folk/Roots album of the Year in 2016. Behind The Wheel was released on 24 March 2016.

In 2017 Rob and Sarah Skinner were deemed to be "performers of a world class level" and were invited by Canadian immigration to become permanent residents of Canada.

Their sixth album, Under Utopian Skies, was voted in several polls as Alternative album of the year in 2018.

In 2020, Rob Skinner became endorsed by Breedlove Guitars.

Their seventh album, Bear With Us was released on October 22, 2021 to high acclaim

Sarah was affected with lung issues after Covid in 2022/3 and the duo were off tour for some time. During their time off, Sarah wrote a book; Are You Sure That’s A Saxophone - a memoir of her early days as a professional musician. The book instantly became an Amazon ‘Hot New Release’ in several categories.

Shortly after celebrating the success of Sarah’s book, the duo won “Indie Artist of the Year” at the 2024 Allevents Awards. The duo are currently writing their ninth album.

The duo's ninth album, Compound Energy has a release date of October 9, 2026

== Influences ==
Supertramp, Roger Hodgson, Pink Floyd, Queen (band), David Bowie, The Civil Wars, Dream Theater.

== Instrumentation ==
- Rob Skinner – Lead vocalist, guitar, bass guitar, drums, percussion, keyboards
- Sarah Skinner – Backing vocalist, saxophone (mainly soprano saxophone), harmonica, keyboards

== Discography ==
- 2011 Grass Roots
- 2012 Home Sweet Home
- 2013 Sinking The Mary Rose
- 2014 Live in Aberdeen
- 2016 Behind The Wheel
- 2018 Under Utopian Skies
- 2021 Bear With Us
- 2022 Live In 2021
- 2026 Compound Energy

== Awards and nominations ==
Year	Association	Category	Nominated work	Result
2012	British Blues Awards	Song of the Year	Cheap Champagne	Nominated
2012	British Blues Awards	Instrumentalist of the Year	Sarah Skinner	Nominated
2013	British Blues Awards	Song of the Year	The Neighbour's Rooster	Nominated
2013	British Blues Awards	Instrumentalist of the Year	Sarah Skinner	Runner-up
2013	Phoenix FM Awards	Instrumentalist of the Year	Sarah Skinner	Won
2013	British Country Music Awards	Horizon Act of the Year	Red Dirt Skinners	Runner-up
2013	British Country Music Awards	People's Choice	Red Dirt Skinners	Runner-up
2013	UK Country Radio Awards	Song of the Year	Mr Jones	Nominated
2014	UUK Country Radio Awards	Act of the Year	Red Dirt Skinners	Finalist
2014	British Blues Awards	Instrumentalist of the Year	Sarah Skinner	Won
2014	British Blues Awards	Acoustic Act of the Year	Red Dirt Skinners	Nominated
2015	British Blues Awards	Instrumentalist of the Year	Sarah Skinner	Runner-up
2015	UK Americana Music Association Awards	UK Artist of the Year	Red Dirt Skinners	Nominated
2015	UK Americana Music Association Awards	UK Instrumentalist of the Year	Sarah Skinner	Nominated
2016	UK Songwriting Awards	Folk Song of the Year	Behind The Wheel	Semi-finalist
2016	International Acoustic Music Awards	Duo of the Year	Red Dirt Skinners	Nominated
2016	JUNO Awards	International Album of the Year	Behind The Wheel	Nominated
2016	Bluesdoodles Picks of 2016	Folk/Roots/ Acoustic Album of the Year	Behind The Wheel	Won
2018	Bluesdoodles Picks of 2018	Alternative Album of the Year	Under Utopian Skies	Won
2018	Music News Picks of 2018	Album of the Year	Under Utopian Skies	Nominated
2018	International Acoustic Music Awards	Duo of the Year	Red Dirt Skinners	Nominated
2021	Music News Picks of 2021	Album of the Year	Bear With Us	Nominated
2024	Indie Artist of the Year by AllEvents	Indie Artist of the Year	Red Dirt Skinners	Won
