= Not Far to Go =

Not Far To Go

Studio album by Trevor Babajack Steger
- Released: 22 November 2022
- Genre: Blues; delta blues; blues rock; Americana

Trevor Babajack Steger chronology
| The Solemn Truth and Barefaced Lies (2020) | Not Far To Go (2022) | Bootleg Blues: Live at Temperance (2023) |

Not Far To Go is the third album released by Trevor Babajack Steger, and the first to feature percussionist Jesse Benns and violinist Jo Chambers, also known as The Trevor Babajack Trio.

== Background ==
The album received favourable reviews across the UK Blues and Americana music press, reaching number 2 in the British Blues Charts and being selected as Album of the Month in December 2022 by the Independent Blues Broadcasters association. Various tracks from the album also received air play on numerous radio stations such as BBC Radio 6 Music, and in early 2023 Steger won the UK Blues Acoustic Act of the Year.

All songs were written by Steger with the exception of "Brownsville", which was originally written by Sleepy John Estes and rearranged by Steger.

== Track listing ==
1. "Rambling Man"
2. "Little Bird"
3. "On The Radio"
4. "Let It Roll"
5. "Black Water"
6. "On Y Va"
7. "Mary, Oh Mary"
8. "Wedding Song"
9. "Ambler Gambler"
10. "Brownsville"

== Personnel ==
Credits adapted from album liner notes:

- Trevor Babajack Steger – vocals, guitar, Weissenborn, Dobro, harmonica
- Jesse Benns – cajón, percussion
- Jo Chambers – violin
- Emma Steger – backing vocals
- Paul Jones – record producer
- Matthew Devenish – mastering
