= Trevor Babajack Steger =

British blues musician

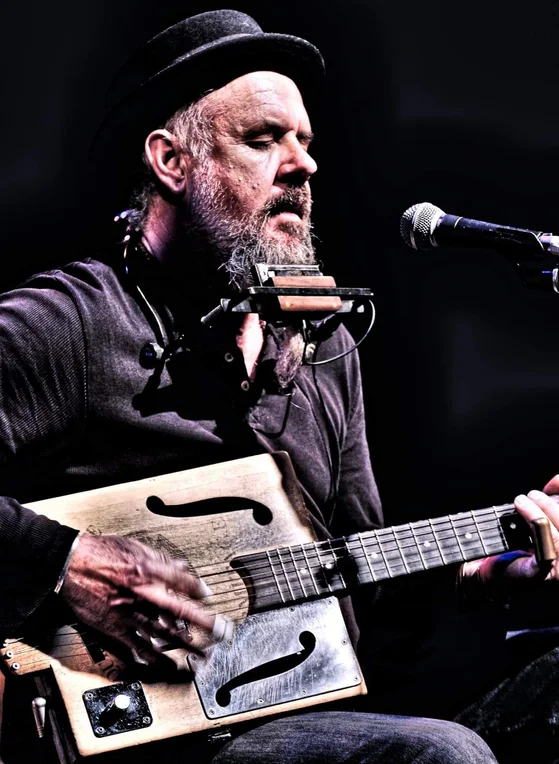
- Steger performing in 2019

Background information
- Also known as: Trevor Babajack
- Born: Trevor Steger; 21 April 1963 (age 63); Cheltenham, Gloucestershire, England
- Genres: Blues, country blues, Delta blues, blues rock, folk, Americana
- Instruments: Guitar, harmonica, slide guitar, lap slide guitar, Vocals
- Members: Jesse Benns
- Website: Trevorbabajacksteger.com

Trevor Babajack Steger (born 21 April 1963) is a British blues musician. He is best known for his work with his former band Babajack, and his subsequent solo career. To date, Steger has released four solo albums, one live album (accompanied by Percussionist Jesse Benns) and been nominated for numerous British Blues Awards, winning Best Acoustic Act in 2023.

Since the release of his third solo album Not Far To Go, which first featured renowned percussionist Jesse Benns (as well as violinist Jo Chambers), Steger has been joined regularly at live shows by Benns. Initially billed as the Trevor Babajack Duo, then following Benns’ establishment in his own right, as Trevor Babajack Steger & Jesse Benns.

== Biography ==
Trevor Babajack Steger was born in Cheltenham, Gloucestershire, England, and was raised listening to his mother, a club singer. He has stated there were only two records in his parents record collection, Johnny Cash and Rory Gallagher.In the late seventies he began his musical career by playing bass in a punk band.

In 1981, a friend dragged him reluctantly along to see Nine Below Zero, the day after he bought himself a Sonny Boy Williamson II record and a harmonica.

Living and working in the 1990s with the Shona people in Mashonaland East Province, Zimbabwe, Steger's first son, Jack was born. Shona custom is that the father takes his son's name, so Steger became known as 'Babajack' (the Father of Jack).

His music is influenced by his acquired passion for early rural Blues, mixed with the sounds of rhythmic African roots, in what can only be described as his own genre of original and seemingly improvised music. His travels have taken him the length of the UK and across Europe, headlining blues and roots festivals and from little French cafés to The Royal Albert Hall.

After the success and eventual disbanding of Babajack, his first solo album Sawdust Man received critical acclaim with international radio play and being playlisted by BBC Radio 2.

This solo album was followed up by his second, The Solemn Truth and Barefaced Lies, which was nominated for the Blues and Roots Radio Best Album.

In 2022, Steger released his third solo album Not Far To Go, and in doing so recruited Jesse Benns on percussion and Jo Chambers on violin. This album was picked as Album of the Month in December 2022 by the Independent Blues Broadcasters Association and also reached number 2 in the British Blues Chart.

In 2023 Steger received his first UK Blues Award as a solo artist, winning the UK Blues Acoustic Act of the Year. He also released a live album with percussionist Jesse Benns, who he began regularly touring with, called Bootleg Blues: Live at Temperance as the Trevor Babajack Duo.

In February 2024, Steger and percussionist Jesse Benns embarked on a European tour as The Trevor Babajack Duo, playing critically acclaimed shows in the UK, Belgium and Italy. Steger was also once again nominated for the UK Blues Acoustic Act of the Year, as well as a new category, Traditional Blues Artist of the Year.

2025 saw the release of Steger's album Six Foot Ten, recorded entirely on his narrow boat, on which he also lives. The album topped the UK Blues charts, earning Steger his first number 1 on the UK Blues Charts. Steger also once again toured Belgium, Italy, Portugal and Spain, both with Jesse Benns on percussion as a duo, and solo.

In 2026, Steger was once again nominated for numerous UK Blues awards, and continued to tour both the UK and Europe with Jesse Benns of percussion.

Steger can be found regularly touring as a duo with Jesse Benns, as well as continuing to play solo shows.

== Personal life ==
Steger lives on a narrow boat with his wife Emma in Gloucestershire. He is also an accomplished woodworker and has hand made several of his guitars that he uses at his live shows.

== Discography ==
=== Solo ===
- Sawdust Man (2018)
- The Solemn Truth and Barefaced Lies (2020)
- Not Far To Go (2022)
- Bootleg Blues: Live at Temperance (With Jesse Benns as the Trevor Babajack Duo) (2023)
- Six Foot Ten (2025)

=== With Babajack ===
- The Maker (2009)
- Rooster (2012)
- Running Man (2013)
