= The Biblical Politics of John Locke =

2004 book by Kim Ian Parker

- Authors: Kim Ian Parker
- Language: English
- Subject: John Locke's thought
- Publisher: Wilfrid Laurier University Press
- Publication date: 2004
- Media type: Print (Hardcover)
- Pages: 210 pp.
- ISBN: 9780889204508

The Biblical Politics of John Locke is a 2004 book by Kim Ian Parker, in which the author provides an account of the impact of the Bible on John Locke’s thought.
