= RavenEye =

English rock band

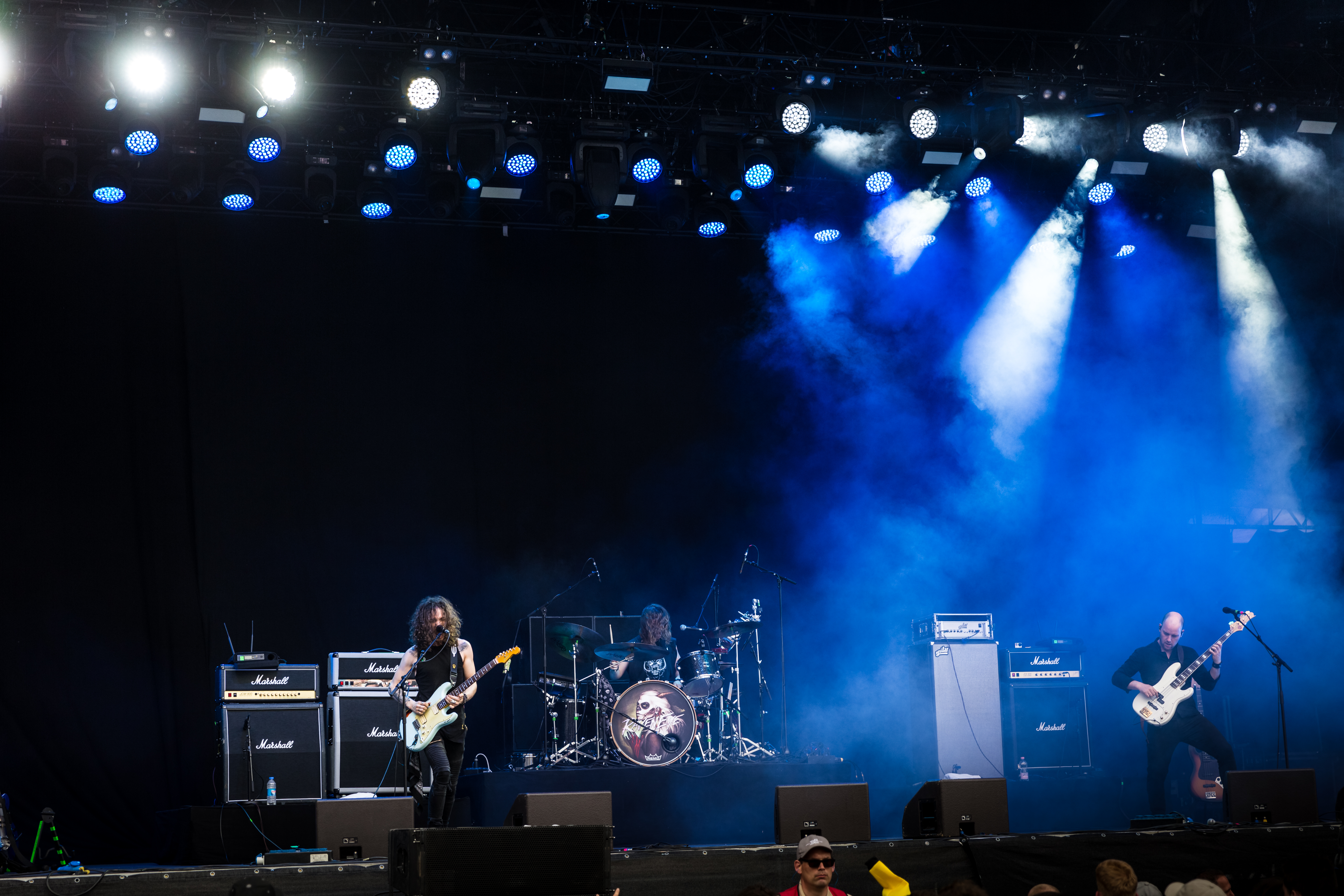
- RavenEye live at Rock am Ring 2017

Background information
- Origin: Milton Keynes, Buckinghamshire, England
- Genres: Hard rock, garage rock, blues rock,
- Years active: 2014–2022
- Labels: Frontiers Records
- Past members: Oli Brown; Aaron Spiers; Adam Breeze; Kev Hickman
- Website: raveneyeofficial.com

RavenEye were an English rock band formed in Milton Keynes in 2014. The band consisted of blues guitarist Oli Brown on vocals, bassist Aaron Spiers and drummer Adam Breeze. Their sound was reminiscent of and rooted in modern garage rock and blues rock.

== Background ==
Blues guitarist Oli Brown formed RavenEye in Milton Keynes in 2014 along with Australian bassist Aaron Spiers and drummer Kev Hickman. Shortly after the formation, the band toured Europe supporting guitarist Joe Satriani on a two-month tour during the summer of 2014. Festivals in Spain and a UK tour ended the busy opening year for the trio.

In January 2015 the band's first single, Breaking Out received over 100,000 plays on SoundCloud in less than a month and was one of Classic Rock's Tracks of the week featured on their website.

In April 2015, the band supported Swedish rock band Blues Pills in the UK. This was followed by a two-week co-headline tour with Spanish band Last Fair Deal through Spain. Through June and July 2015, the band supported Slash featuring Myles Kennedy and The Conspirators.

The band's debut E.P Breaking Out was released on 28 April 2015. Also released was a music video and lyric video for the titled track of the EP.

After supporting Deep Purple for two dates in France joined again with Slash in November 2015 to tour Eastern Europe. The band toured the UK again in January and February 2016. In August 2016, RavenEye announced their new drummer, Adam Breeze, from Hemel Hempstead after Hickman decided to leave the band. In September 2016, the band released their first album Nova with Frontiers Records, who they signed with in July 2016.

RavenEye were the support act on the Lisbon date of Aerosmith's 2017 Aero-vederci European tour.

In an interview with MetalTalk in February 2023, Brown confirmed that the band "just didn't work out".

== Band members ==
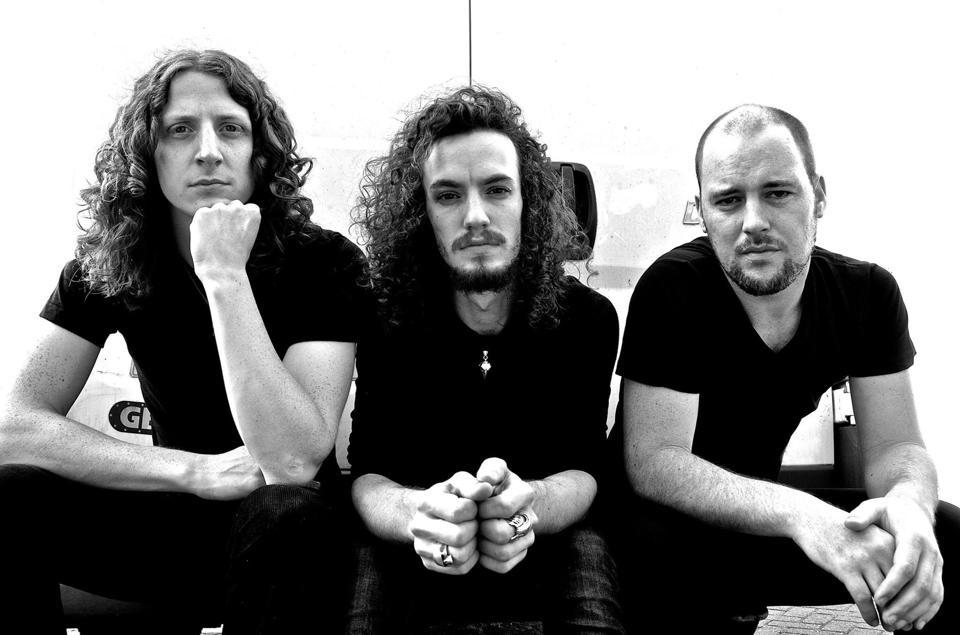
Kev Hickman, Oli Brown and Aaron Spiers.

- Oli Brown – lead vocals, guitar (2014–present)
- Aaron Spiers – backing vocals, bass guitar (2014–present)
- Adam Breeze - drums (2016–present)
- Kev Hickman – drums (2014–2016)

== Discography ==
=== EPs ===
- Breaking Out (2015) (self-released)

=== Studio albums ===
- Nova (2016) (Frontiers Records)
