= Ian Siegal =

British blues musician

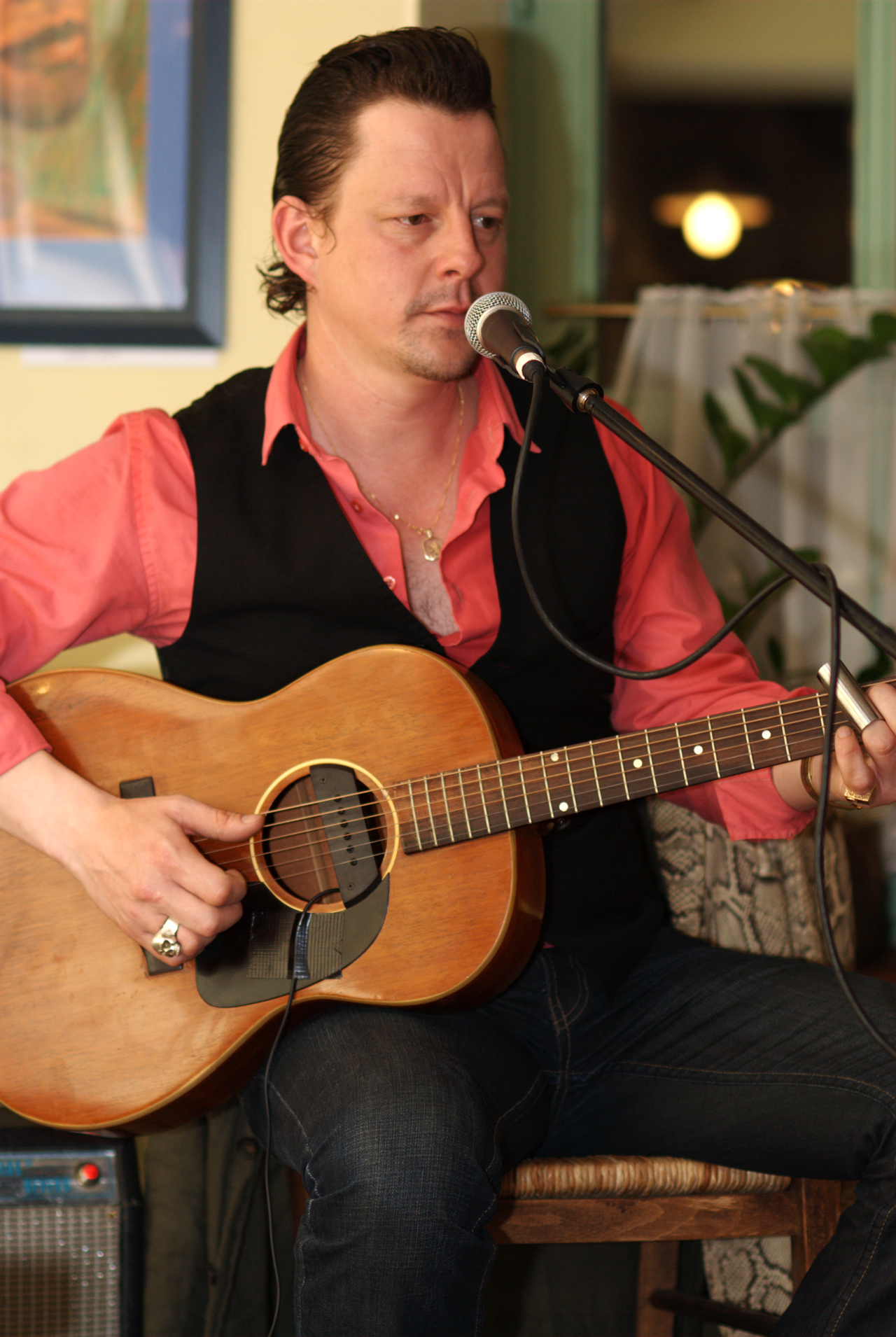
- Ian Siegal playing in Szentendre, Hungary, 2009

Background information
- Born: Portsmouth, England
- Genres: Blues
- Occupation: Musician
- Instrument: Guitar
- Label: Nugene
- Website: www.iansiegal.com

Ian Siegal is a British blues singer and guitarist.

== Biography ==
Ian Siegal is a singer, songwriter, guitarist, bandleader and recording artist whose music encompasses Blues and Americana. Born near Portsmouth in England, he dropped out of art college in the late 1980s and went busking in Germany. He has toured in the UK and Europe.

In 2005 he released the first of several albums on the Nugene label. Meat & Potatoes was recorded with Nikolaj Bjerre (drums), Andy Graham (bass), Jonny Henderson (organ), and with guitar contributions by Matt Schofield, who also acted as producer. The album includes several songs written by Siegal or co-written with Keith Harrison, that have since become readily identified with Siegal's sound and style. The album is listed in the Penguin Book of Blues Recordings, with a rating of four stars out of four. Two further albums with the same line up follows: in 2007 Swagger and in 2009 Broadside, the latter picked by MOJO magazine as blues album of the year. A year earlier, he released his first solo acoustic album, 2008's The Dust.

At the inaugural British Blues Awards in 2010, Siegal won Best Band. In the following three years, he collected awards in various categories including Best Male Vocalist, Best Solo Artist, Best Album, and Best Song. He was one of the early inductees to the British Blues Awards Hall of Fame.

His 2011 release, The Skinny, was recorded in North Mississippi when Cody Dickinson of the North Mississippi Allstars was hired as record producer and also played on the album. Other American musicians were Robert Kimbrough, on guitar, Garry Burnside on bass, and on drums Rod Bland. Guesting were Alvin Youngblood Hart and Duwayne Burnside. This album was nominated in the 2012 Blues Music Award for Best Contemporary Blues Album.

A return visit to the Dickinson's Zebra Ranch studio in Coldwater, Mississippi, resulted in the 2012 album, Candy Store Kid, credited to Ian Siegal & The Mississippi Mudbloods. This album was also nominated for a Blues Music Award in the Contemporary Blues Album category. This album was also produced by Cody Dickinson. Other musicians included Garry Burnside, Luther Dickinson, Alvin Youngblood Hart, Lightnin' Malcolm, and a trio of backing singers Stefanie Bolton, Sharisse Norman, and Shontelle Norman.

In 2012, Ian Siegal & The Mississippi Mudbloods performed at the Manchester Bluesfest recorded by the BBC. Later he was the guest interviewee of Paul Jones on the latter's BBC Radio 2 show. An appearance at the London Bluesfest in 2013 resulted in an album release (April 2014) entitled Man and Guitar recorded by the BBC and released by Nugene Records.

In a twist to his career, he played for several years with France's Orchestre National de Jazz in a program of Billie Holiday songs entitled Broadway in Satin. Backed by a 12-piece orchestra of young hand-picked musicians and accompanied by the French singer Karen Lanaud, Siegal performed Broadway in Satin at festivals across France and South America and East Africa.

== Discography ==
- 2004 Standing in the Morning
- 2005 Meat & Potatoes
- 2006 A Bigger Plate of Meat and Potatoes
- 2007 Swagger
- 2008 The Dust
- 2009 Broadside
- 2011 The Skinny (with the Youngest Sons)
- 2012 Candy Store Kid (with Mississippi Mudbloods)
- 2014 Man and Guitar
- 2015 The Picnic Sessions
- 2015 One Night in Amsterdam
- 2016 Wayward Sons (with Jimbo Mathus)
- 2018 All The Rage
- 2022 Stone By Stone
- 2024 Easy Tiger (with Johnny Mastro)

== Band ==
- Ian Siegal – vocals, guitar
- Dusty Ciggaar – guitar
- Danny van 't Hoff – bass guitar
- Rafael Schwiddessen – drum

Ian Siegal featuring the Mississippi Mudbloods

- Ian Siegal – vocals, guitar, bass
- Alvin Youngblood Hart – bass, guitar, vocals
- Luther Dickinson – guitar, bass, vocals, mandolin
- Cody Dickinson – drums, guitar, vocals
- Carwyn Ellis – bass, vocals
- Duane Betts – guitar, vocals
- Lightnin' Malcolm – guitar, bass, vocals
