= Scott McKeon =

British blues musician

- Genres: Blues rock
- Occupations: Guitarist, songwriter, singer, music tutor
- Instruments: Guitar, vocals
- Years active: 1990s–present
- Label: Various

Scott McKeon is a British blues rock guitarist, songwriter, singer, and music tutor. He has issued four albums under his name, and worked as a session musician both in the recording studio and in live concert appearances. He is currently the guitarist in Sir Tom Jones' backing ensemble. McKeon has issued an online guide to guitar playing techniques, and manufactured his own bespoke guitar pedals and signature pickups.

== Life and career ==
He grew up in Southern England in a musical family. His father had been a guitarist for the Diplomats, who had opened shows in the early 1960s for both the Beatles and Gerry and the Pacemakers. With access to his parents' record collection as a guide, McKeon was playing the guitar by the age of four, and could manage with a full size Fender Stratocaster by the age of eight. He became the face of a television advertisement for Fender, who were trying to engage with a new generation of guitar players. He was turned towards blues music when aged ten, after viewing video footage of Stevie Ray Vaughan, which led to McKeon playing in a blues band when just 13 years old. However his father died around this time, but not before McKeon was named Guitarist magazine's 'Young Guitarist of the Year' in 1998. Competent and confident enough to record a demo CD when aged 18, a copy was passed to Jakko Jakszyk and then on to Paul Crockford, the manager of Mark Knopfler. Crockford began to represent McKeon and this led to McKeon recording his debut album, Can't Take No More, which was released on 26 February 2007. It was produced by Jesse Davey, once of the British blues band, The Hoax. In promoting the album, McKeon toured across Europe and the United States, which included performing at the Montreal International Jazz Festival, and the Glastonbury Festival, and making American television appearances. McKeon wrote the music for Robert M. Knight's 2009 Rock Prophecies documentary, which won him a RIIFF Award for 'Best Soundtrack'.

His second album, Trouble, was released by Provogue Records on 29 March 2010. The album included contributions from Robbie McIntosh and David Ryan Harris from John Mayer's band. In support of the album's release, McKeon toured, opening shows for Derek Trucks, Gary Clark Jr. and the Arc Angels. He also made his first performance at the Royal Albert Hall, when supporting Joe Bonamassa. A track from the album was used both on Guitar Hero 5, and on the television programme, LA Task Force. McKeon had relocated to London in 2010, and began to attract work as a session musician for a number of years, working with Zigaboo Modeliste, James Arthur, Emeli Sandé, Lana Del Rey, Van Morrison, Andreya Triana, Ed Sheeran and Rebecca Ferguson. In 2014, McKeon was invited to join Sir Tom Jones' backing ensemble, where he remains to his day. His work with Jones has included television appearances on Later... with Jools Holland and TFI Friday, and performing in 2019 at the New Orleans Jazz & Heritage Festival. During 2011, McKeon spent time writing in Nashville, Tennessee, a spell which included working with Tyler Bryant and Heidi Rojas.

McKeon is proud of his 1962 sunburst Fender Stratocaster, a gift from his father when McKeon was 12 years old. As the instrument aged and became more fragile, McKeon jumped at the offer from the Fender Custom Shop in 2016 to provide an exact replica. McKeon stated "We flew the ’62 over to Fender and they had it for a month or so to get the exact wear patterns and to perfectly copy the look and feel. Then, a year or so later, the replica turned up and completely blew me away!" In 2017, McKeon founded a group, Rufus Black, which in addition to McKeon included singer Gavin Conder, guitarist Ben Jones and percussionist Russ Parker. They released an album, Rise Up. In early 2018, McKeon attended a charity event, where he ended up playing his replica Fender on stage alongside one of his musical heroes, Eric Clapton. The experience enthused McKeon to want to record another album. Other session work saw McKeon, in 2019, join Schiller on his Morgenstund tour, playing 15 shows in Germany. Later that year, McKeon joined Doyle Bramhall II's band for part of his European tour. McKeon has also been part of John Illsley's live band, and he featured on Illsley's 2019 album, Coming Up for Air.

Following delays caused by the COVID-19 pandemic in the United Kingdom, McKeon's third album, New Morning, was released on 23 April 2021. The album was recorded in various London studios, including RAK Studios, and was produced by Paul Stacey. From the age of 18, McKeon had been designing and manufacturing his own guitar fuzz pedal and signature pickups, modelled on his own guitar. He noted thereafter that "after opening a couple of shows for Joe Bonamassa he asked me what the pedal was and if I could make him one, before telling me I should sell them". McKeon's own SM Fuzz, was soon available and purchased and used by Gary Clark Jr. and Doyle Bramhall II among others, and McKeon later developed an all-new SM Octave Fuzz.

McKeon also created an online teaching aid for blues guitar players. The course starts at the early roots of R&B, and gives advice and tips to master more tricky techniques. The lessons include a range of interactive tabs and notation throughout, that can be slowed down and looped to aid understanding. There are 31 mini lessons, starting with acoustic guitar playing before moving through to electric, with subtle variations on a theme explored and explained.

McKeon's latest venture was recording the five track mini-album, Live at Real World Studios. The personnel were similar to those used on McKeon's album, New Morning, with Paul Stacey again acting as record producer. It was released on 8 April 2022.

== Discography ==
=== Albums ===
Year	Title	Record label
2007	Can't Take No More	WastedLion Records
2010	Trouble	Provogue Records
2021	New Morning	Self-released
2022	Live at Real World Studios	Self-released

== See also ==
- List of British blues musicians
