= Nick Donnelly =

British filmmaker and producer

Nicholas James Donnelly (born 17 May 1988) is a British filmmaker, author, media platform founder and former music video producer.

== Career ==
=== Music videos ===
In December 2010 Donnelly first gained national exposure when directing/producing the music video Game Over Female Takeover, an independent, zero budget release that featured many of the leading female urban artists in England on one video. These artists included Lady Leshurr, Mz Bratt, Ruff Diamondz, Cherri Voncelle, and Amplify Dot The video served as the official remix to the record "Game Over" and charted number 4 on British television channel Flava while reaching over a million viewers on the online platform GRM Daily ('Grime Daily' at the time).

At the beginning of 2011 Donnelly produced the two-part music video Bad Boys Remix, a collaboration with rap artist Swiss from the So Solid Crew. Bad Boys Remix 1 featured Blak Twang, Klashnekoff, and Akala among others from the late 2000 UK hip-hop scene, while Bad Boys Remix 2 featured Charlie Sloth, Krept and Konan and others.

In October 2011 Donnelly launched his first media platform 'Urban Kingdom' with music video Oliver Whitehouse when Nick Donnelly teamed with Ruff Ryders Entertainment to direct the music video Love Through The Speakers for battle rapper Murda Mook – the first music video from his mixtape 401k that was hosted by DJ Khaled and featured appearances from Akon, Jadakiss and Lil' Kim. Urban Kingdom also produced music videos directed by Oliver Whitehouse such as 'Lord Giveth Lord Taketh Away' by Freddie Gibbs and Statik Selektah, 'High On Life' by Phil Ade and Raheem DeVaughn, produced by 9th Wonder and Krept 'Paranormal Activity Remix' by Krept featuring Ghetts, Scorcher and others.

Donnelly directed the debut music video for American soul singer Jalen N'Gonda. Jo Harman's music video The Reformation was directed by Donnelly, as is the Hannah Williams & The Affirmations video, Late Nights & Heartbreak, that was sampled by Jay-Z on the title track to his Grammy Award-nominated record 4:44. Donnelly worked again with Hannah Williams & The Affirmations for the title track to their 2019 album 50 Foot Woman. The music video to 50 Foot Woman was premiered by El País and FIP

In November 2019 Donnelly worked with UK rap artist Blue Meth and US hip-hop artist Method Man from Wu-Tang Clan on the music video Winnebago. In February 2020, Donnelly released his final music video What Ya Tellin Me with Blue Meth which premiered on Worldstar.

=== Feature films and documentaries ===
Donnelly's first film God Save The Queen was released in December 2015 and featured Motown artist and Rock and Roll Hall of Fame inductee Martha Reeves, as well as British songwriter Carla Marie Williams who wrote the tracks "Running'" and "Freedom" for Beyoncé. In 2018, Spotify premiered a documentary, at their London headquarters, directed and filmed by Donnelly at Abbey Road Studios that was about Williams' process making music for herself. The documentary also features Lily Allen, Misha B, Leah McFall and Paigey Cakey

In August 2020 Urban Kingdom released Donnelly's second feature documentary film Street Smart. The film features the only behind the scenes footage from Wu-Tang Clan 20th Anniversary Tour in Manchester, Brixton and at Bestival as well as exclusive interviews with Ghostface Killah, Method Man, Raekwon and the only English language interview with Danish music Liv Lykke whose record Tiden Flyver (as part of Boom Clap Bachelors) was sampled by Kendrick Lamar on his record 'Steve Don't Kill My Vibe.'

Nick Donnelly's platform Urban Kingdom has also interviewed Talib Kweli, Lonnie Liston Smith, Zuby, Immortal Technique, RA The Rugged Man, Jon B and Suzi Quatro.

In August 2022 Donnelly's Urban Kingdom released their second platform 'Generation W' which launched with exclusive videos with Charlie Morgan Stacey Copeland and more.

=== Books and magazines ===
In July 2019 Donnelly's production company Urban Kingdom published Generation W, a book which featured 100 British women writing about living through 100 years since women began to receive the vote in the UK. Women writing for the book include Olympic champion Sally Gunnell, Carol M. Black, Averil Mansfield, Lily Cole and Susie Wolff.

Donnelly's debut fiction book Urban Legends was released on 6 July 2022, and entered at number 99 in the movie and television chart and number 2227 across all horror books on Kobo Inc.

In October 2022 Generation W launched their first magazine titled Wearth. Issue One was released exclusive to the city of Liverpool and featured exclusive interviews with women such as Maggie O'Carroll, Jizzie Acker and Freya Cox from the television show The Great British Bake Off, Rain Castillo, a semi-finalist on the 2022 edition of the show The Voice UK, Ngunan Adamu a presenter for BBC Radio Merseyside and others. Issue One launched at The Zanzibar in Liverpool. At the beginning of March 2023, Generation W announced Wearth Issue Two, launching at the Millennium Powerhouse Youth center in Moss Side, Manchester, birthplace of suffragette Emmeline Pankhurst. Issue two of the magazine was photographed and edited by Donnelly and features Nxdia on the front cover and included written interviews with Erinma Bell MBE, Rebecca Friel MBE, The KTNA and others. In March 2024, Issue Three of Wearth was announced and featured exclusive interviews with Sophie B. Hawkins, Anna Smith (critic) and more.

In August 2023, to celebrate 50 years of hip-hop, Donnelly's documentary film Street Smart, screened at Songbyrd Music House in Washington D.C., US and Rich Mix Cinema in London, England. Donnelly also announced his new book Hip-Hopulation which features interviews with hip-hop artists all over the world, including Prabh Deep (India), Ez Mil (The Philippines), Silvana Imam (Sweden), Frenkie (Bosnia) and Kobie Dee (Australia). The book was premiered in August 2024 partnering with Majora Carter's Boogie Down Grind in The Bronx, New York City.

=== Music ===
In September 2020 Donnelly's Urban Kingdom launched Generation Worldwide which featured over 50 female-led artists from over 20 countries performing musical performances during the global Coronavirus lockdowns in association with the Generation W book. Musicians performing for the Urban Kingdom festival included Karen Harding, Girli, Aubrey Logan and Kalben. Speaking to The Courier, Donnelly said "The idea for Generation Worldwide was reactionary... It was one of these ideas so crazy it might just work, but so crazy you would never even dream of writing it down in plan... Knowing that the music industry was broken this year, and knowing that on average only 19% of performers at festivals are women, we took this opportunity to create a new experience".

On 23 July 2021 Donnelly's platform Urban Kingdom reopened the Newcastle music venue The Cluny for the first time since the removal of lockdown restrictions in the UK. Artists performing were Abi Nyxx, Lizzie Esau and Georgia May. In August 2021, Donnelly and Urban Kingdom put on the first live music show at Orange Yard in Soho, a venue that was formerly known as Borderline and had hosted shows for artists such as Oasis, Amy Winehouse and R.E.M. Artists performing at the event at Orange Yard included Nadia Javed of the British pop punk band The Tuts, Berklee College of Music graduate Olivia Swann, BRIT School graduate Saina, Chelsea Blues and Atlanta Mae.

After launching originally with a live out out show at The Troubadour with Storry in March 2023, Nick Donnelly's Generation W platform made a live music debut in New York City, at Rockwood Music Hall which Spin did an exclusive feature on and has continued to put on live music shows at venues such as Oh Yeah (music centre) in Belfast, Tiny Rebel in Cardiff, Outernet London on Denmark Street in London and more.
