= The Solemn Truth and Barefaced Lies =

Studio album by Trevor Babajack Steger
- Released: 11 September 2020
- Genre: Blues; Delta blues; blues rock; Americana

Trevor Babajack Steger chronology
Sawdust Man (2018)	The Solemn Truth and Barefaced Lies (2020)	Not Far to Go (2022)

The Solemn Truth and Barefaced Lies is the second solo album released by Trevor Babajack Steger. The album features backing vocals by Lily Skinner, and percussion from Ben Okafor.

The album was nominated for the Blues and Roots Radio Album of 2020.

== Track listing ==
1. "Live Forever"
2. "I'm Up, I'm Down"
3. "Devil Inside"
4. "Red Dress"
5. "Something That You Want"
6. "Deep River Blues"
7. "Can't Get Along With You"
8. "In My Time of Dying"
9. "Weather Man"
10. "The Solemn Truth and Barefaced Lies"
