= Oli Brown =

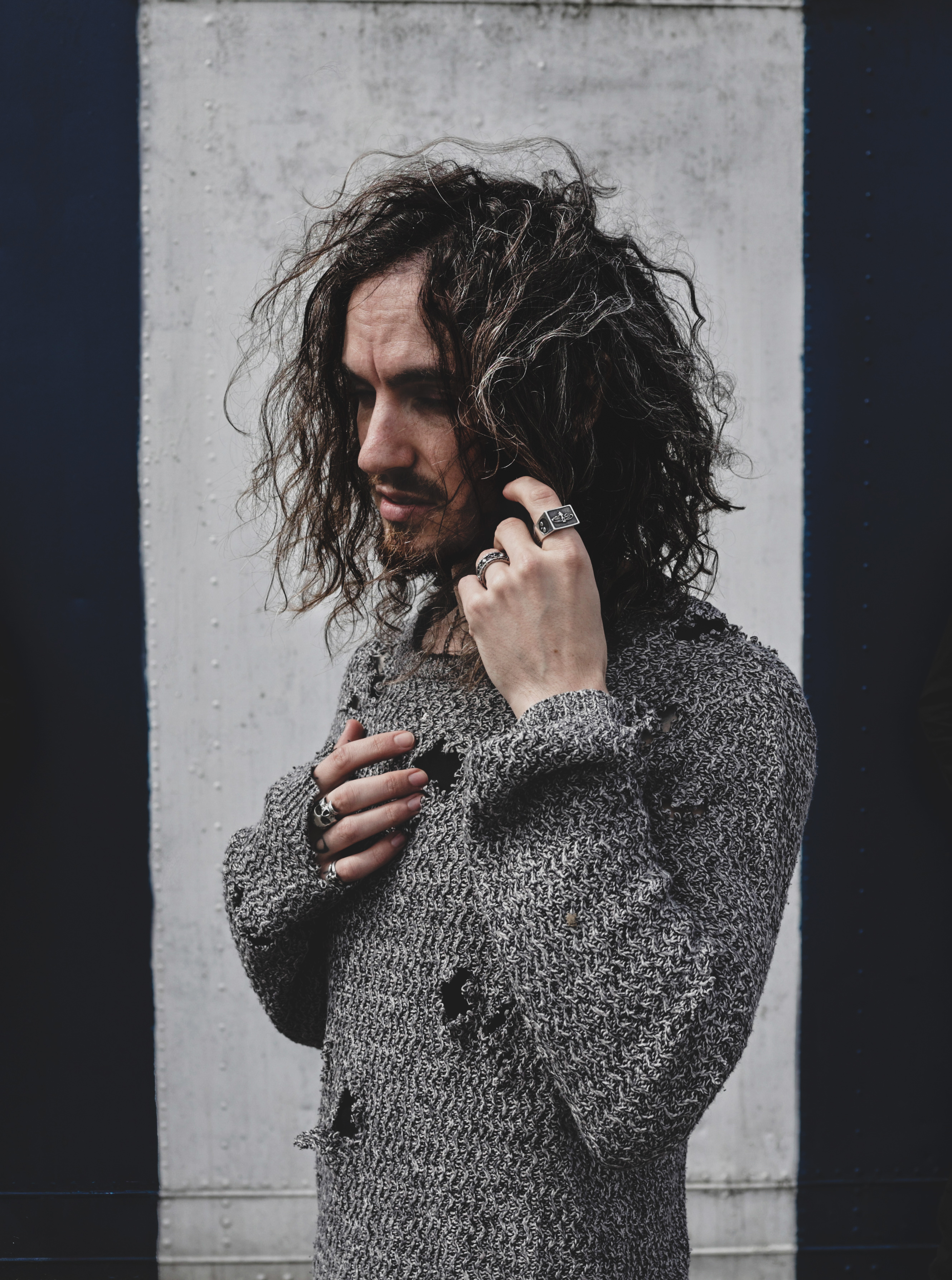
- Oli Brown

Background information
- Born: Oliver Brown; 23 May 1989 (age 37); Norfolk, England
- Genres: Rock, Alternative rock
- Occupations: Guitarist, Singer, Songwriter, Mixer, Producer
- Instrument: Guitar
- Years active: 2005–present
- Labels: Ruf, Frontiers
- Website: www.olibrownofficial.com

Oli Brown (born 23 May 1989) is an English guitarist, singer-songwriter, mix engineer and producer. He is a member of the alt-atmospheric rock band, The Dead Collective, alongside Wayne Proctor and Sam Wood.

The Dead Collective have currently released three EPs; Prelude, Prologue and Epilogue. The debut album for the Dead Collective is currently in production.

As a solo artist in his past, he has released three studio albums and one live album, but has since absolved himself of his blues roots in forming The Dead Collective.

== History ==
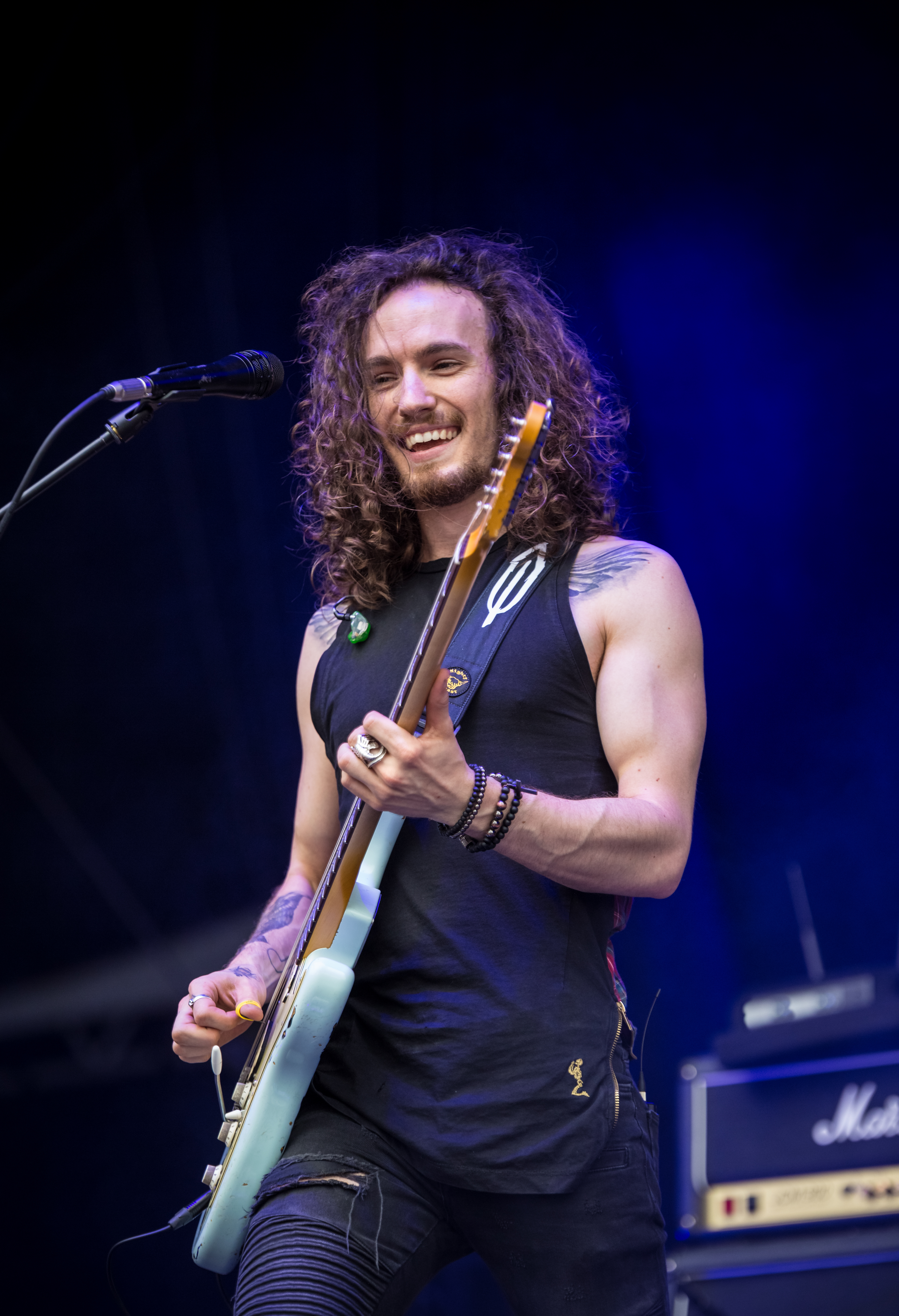
Oli Brown with RavenEye live at Rock am Ring 2017

Brown was signed to the German blues label, Ruf Records, in January 2008. He released his debut album, Open Road, in July 2008 to good reviews.

Oli's second album, Heads I Win Tails You Lose, was released in 2010, and was produced by Mike Vernon. In the same year, Brown made his debut at the Glastonbury Festival. Classic Rock magazine voted Heads I Win Tails You Lose the number 3 blues album of 2010. Mojo voted it the number 4 blues album of that same year.

At the 2010 British Blues Awards, Brown was named 'Best Male Vocalist' and 'Best Young Artist'.

In the 2011 British Blues Awards, Brown won the 'Best Band' category and Heads I Win Tails You Lose was named 'Best Album'. He was also runner up in the 'Best Male Vocalist', 'Best Guitarist' and 'Best Young Artist' categories.

Following a 25 date tour of the UK as the opening act for John Mayall, Mayall asked Brown to step into the lead guitarist role of his band, when Rocky Athas was unable to attend the Indonesian Blues Festival in December 2011.

Brown's third album Here I Am was released on 23 April 2012, and featured Scott Barnes (bass), Wayne Proctor (drums and percussion) and Joel White (keyboards) with guest performances by Dani Wilde and Paul Jones. Here I Am was number one in the Amazon, HMV and iTunes blues charts and was released in the United States in June 2012. Brown was nominated for Best Guitarist and Best Young Artist in the 2012 British Blues Awards.

On 3 June 2013, at the Grand Rex in Paris, he opened for Joe Satriani and released a live album, entitled Songs From The Road on 14 June 2013.

In 2014, he formed rock trio RavenEye with bassist Aaron Spiers and drummer Kev Hickman.

In 2022, Brown announced a new project named Oli Brown & The Dead Collective. The band's name was shortened to The Dead Collective in August 2025.

== Discography ==
- Open Road (2008) Ruf Records – RUF 1139
- Heads I Win, Tails You Lose (2010) Ruf Records – RUF 1160
- Here I Am (2012) Ruf Records – RUF 1178
- Songs From The Road (2013) Ruf Records
- Prelude (2023)
- Prologue (2023)
- Epilogue (2024)
