= The Nimmo Brothers =

Scottish bluesrock band

The Nimmo Brothers are a Scottish blues rock band.

== History ==
The Nimmo Brothers was founded in 1995 by the brothers Stevie and Alan Nimmo (both of whom play guitar and sing) in Glasgow. Previously, they were in a group called the Blackwater Blues Band, which released one album. Over time, the Nimmo brothers have had several accompanying musicians.

The Nimmo Brothers recorded their first album Moving On (1998) in Glasgow. Their subsequent albums have all been recorded for Armadillo Music. Their first album for Armadillo, recorded in 2001, was Coming Your Way.

Since 2009, Alan Nimmo performs with his band King King. His older brother Stevie plays with the Stevie Nimmo Trio. But both brothers also continue to perform as The Nimmo Brothers.

In 2015, The Nimmo Brothers toured the UK for the 20th anniversary of their band. In 2015 and 2016, they received British Blues Awards as best blues band.

== Discography ==
- 1998: Moving On
- 2001: Coming Your Way
- 2003: New Moon Over Memphis
- 2004: Live Cottiers Theatre
- 2009: Picking Up the Pieces
- 2012: Brother to Brother
