= Jack Broadbent (musician) =

British blues musician (born 1988)

- Born: 15 June 1988 (age 38); Lincolnshire, England
- Genre: Blues rock
- Occupations: Guitarist, singer, songwriter
- Instruments: Guitar, vocals
- Years active: 2010s–present
- Label: Various
- Website: Official website

Jack Broadbent (born 15 June 1988) is a British blues rock guitarist, singer, and songwriter. He has released six albums to date, and has toured with Lynyrd Skynyrd, Peter Frampton, Ronnie Wood, Richard Thompson and Bill Payne. The latter musician, a Little Feat founding member said about Broadbent, "I love his voice. His playing is superb, showing an almost reckless abandon when he gets revved up".

== Life and career ==
He was born in Lincolnshire, England in a musical family. His father, Mick Broadbent, played bass guitar and keyboards in the late 1970s power pop outfit, Bram Tchaikovsky. Broadbent started his own musical journey by playing the drums, and did so in his father's band for a while. He moved towards the guitar when he thought that would help him in trying his hand at songwriting. When he was still a youth, his father took Broadbent to open mic nights to further his education. By the time he reached his early 20s, Broadbent spent several years busking, firstly in London and then further afield across Europe. During this time he developed his own methodology of playing slide guitar, using a well-worn steel whiskey flask as the slide. Being used to playing in altered or open tunings this came easily to Broadbent, who found street audiences appreciative of his playing. Broadbent noted, "I never really wanted to emulate anybody else's style, which is why I ended up going down a slightly more hard-hitting, brash, kind of route in my playing". In 2013, Broadbent recorded an EP, The Busking CD, in his London flat, with the aim to sell copies whilst he was busking on the streets. The same year, Broadbent self-released his first album, Public Announcement, on which he recorded all of the instrumentation, in a residence in the Lake District on a digital four-track machine. In 2015, he self-released another album, Along the Trail of Tears.

In 2016, the Montreux Jazz Festival called Broadbent, "The new master of the slide guitar". Portrait became Broadbent's third album that same year. The increasing coverage of him led Broadbent to tour more widely, opening shows variously for Lynyrd Skynyrd, Peter Frampton, and Ronnie Wood. A live album, One Night Stand was issued in 2018 on Creature Records. The recording processes for Broadbent's fourth studio album were different from before. Broadbent and his father recorded the guitar and bass parts initially at Peter Keys recording studio in Nashville, Tennessee. Later Keys himself, Lynyrd Skynyrd's current piano player, added his keyboard instrumentation along with Bruce Cameron, who co-produced the album with Broadbent. Mickey Gutierrez played a saxophone solo on one of the songs. All the percussion work was undertaken by Broadbent. Broadbent has got rave reviews from Billboard and American Songwriter.

The styling of the recording of what became Broadbent's sixth album, was a victim of circumstance. Stuck in Quebec, Canada, due to the global ramifications of the COVID-19 pandemic, Broadbent intended to make an acoustic recording. However, in working with Mark Gibson in a small recording studio, Broadbent stated, "... we started playing some of the more rock 'n' roll stuff I had, and we couldn't deny that there was a kind of vibe happening... We built on those grooves and ended up with the rock 'n' roll record I've been wanting to make for a long time". Broadbent's father added the bass guitar performances in England, as the partial recording was electronically transmitted back and forth across the Atlantic Ocean. The resultant album of eight songs was named Ride and released on 8 April 2022. In Europe, Broadbent opened for Richard Thompson in July 2022.

== Discography ==
=== Albums ===
Year	Title	Record label
2013	Public Announcement	Self-released
2015	Along the Trail of Tears	Self-released
2016	Portrait	Self-released
2018	One Night Stand (live)	Creature Records
2019	Moonshine Blue	Crow's Feet Records
2022	Ride	Crow's Feet Records
2026	Orchids	Creature Records

== See also ==
- List of British blues musicians
