= Chantel McGregor =

British musician

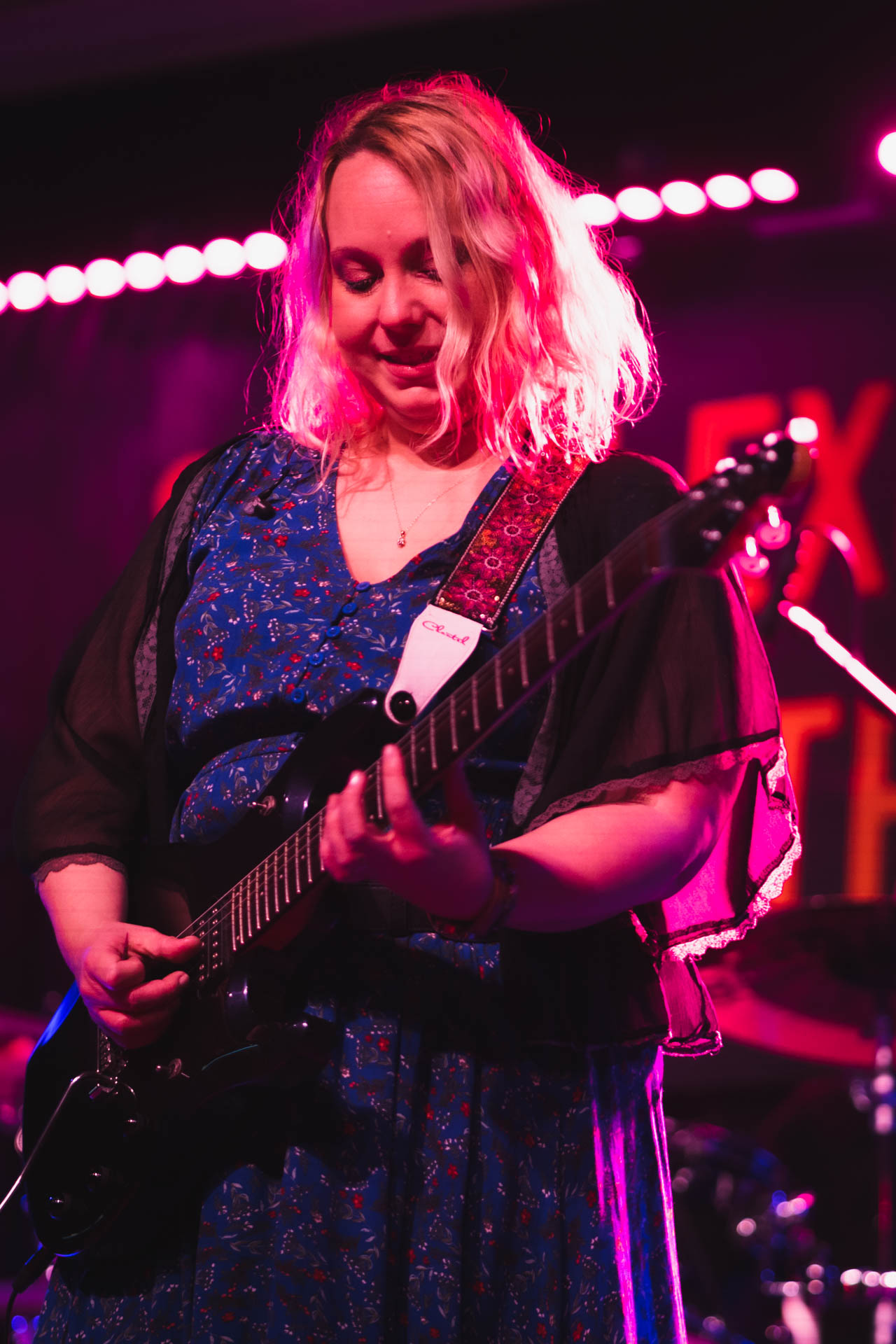

Background information
- Born: March 12, 1986 (age 40); Bradford, England
- Genres: Rock, blues, blues rock
- Occupation: Musician
- Instruments: Guitar, vocals
- Website: chantelmcgregor.com

Chantel Dawn McGregor (born 12 March 1986) is an English blues rock guitarist and singer-songwriter.

== History ==
McGregor was given her guitar and was given some tuition by her father. She was having formal lessons at the age of seven. She listened to her parents' music including Black Sabbath and Fleetwood Mac. One of her favourite albums is Fleetwood Mac's Rumours album and she has recorded some of their music.

McGregor attended Leeds College of Music where she achieved a number of awards, including the Leeds College of Music Prize for Outstanding Musicianship. She gained a First Class Honours degree in Popular Music in 2008, and has gone on to develop a career in the UK and international blues and rock music scene, performing solo and with her band.

In 2011, McGregor won "Young Artist of the Year" at the British Blues Awards, and in 2012, she won "Best Female Vocalist" at the British Blues Awards. In 2013 she won two categories, "Guitarist Of The Year" and "Best Female Vocalist", at the British Blues Awards. and again won the "Guitarist Of The Year" category in 2014.

Her debut album Like No Other, released in 2011, was produced by Livingstone Brown, who has worked with such artists as Ed Sheeran, Shakira, Kylie Minogue and Corinne Bailey Rae. Her second album Lose Control, also produced by Livingstone Brown, was released on 9 October 2015.

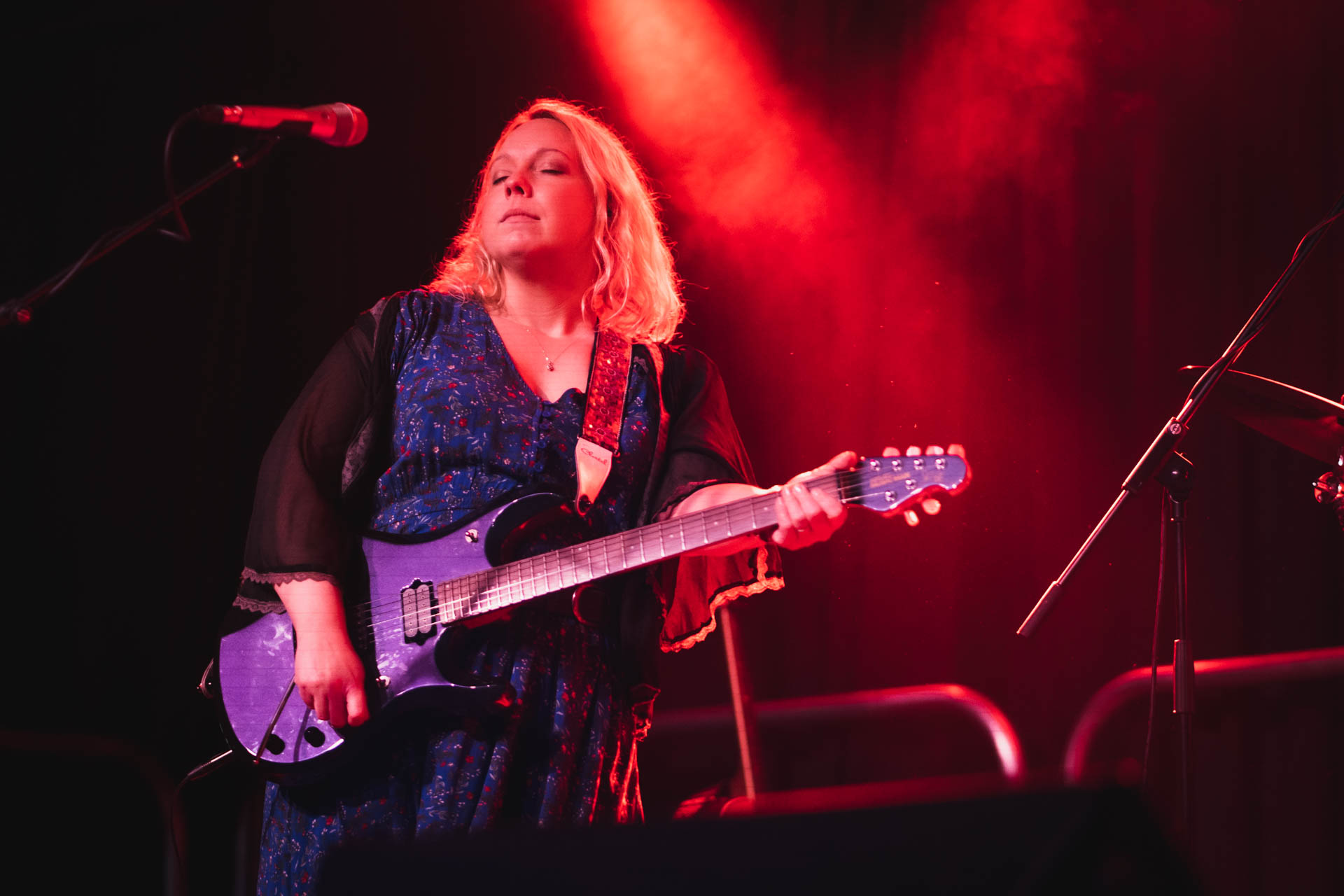
McGregor at the Corn Exchange, Hertford in 2023

A live album, Bury'd Alive, recorded at The Apex, Bury St Edmunds, on 29 March 2019, was released on 6 September 2019. This is made up of songs from the first two albums, Like No Other and Lose Control, together with a song from her next studio album, a long instrumental entitled "April". In December 2019, the American magazine, Guitar World, proclaimed Bury'd Alive as the 11th best guitar album of the decade.

In May 2020, she released a reworked cover of "Stupid Love" by Lady Gaga through the Los Angeles-based Cleopatra Records. Also in May 2020, she became a regular weekly presenter on Hard Rock Hell Radio with her show Chantel's Monday Brunch Club.

Released in November 2020, the Dr. John album, Gumbo Blues, featured her on guitar.

During the COVID-19 Pandemic, she performed a live weekly show from her shed and later with Jamie Brooks on keyboards. She released two albums of songs in 2021. Shed Sessions Volume One, was performed solo with an acoustic guitar and Shed Sessions Volume Two was on electric guitar with Jamie Brooks on keyboards.

In May 2025 she released her third studio album with her band, "The Healing".

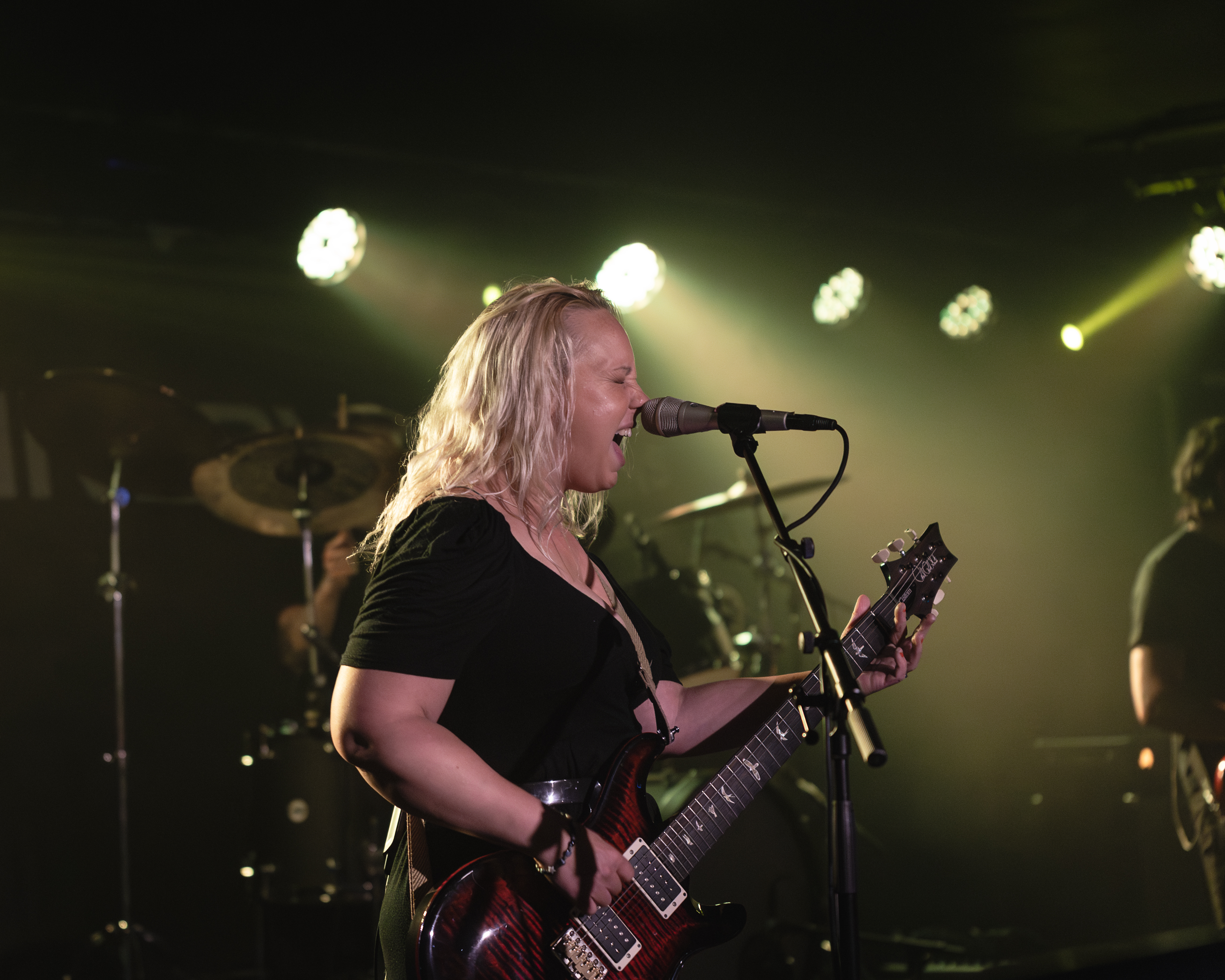
Chantel McGregor performs in Southend-on-Sea, UK, June 2025

== Discography ==
Title	Details
Like No Other	Released: 24 June 2011; Label: Tis Rock Music Ltd – TRM001; Format: Digital download, CD
Lose Control	Released: 9 October 2015; Label: Tis Rock Music Ltd – TRM002; Format: Digital download, CD
Bury'd Alive	Released: 6 September 2019; Label: Tis Rock Music Ltd – TRM003; Format: Digital download, CD
Stupid Love	Released: 23 May 2020; Label: Cleopatra Records Inc; Format: Digital download
Shed Sessions Volume One	Released: 12 July 2021; Label: Tis Rock Music Ltd – TRM004; Format: Digital download, CD
Shed Sessions Volume Two	Released: 2 August 2021; Label: Tis Rock Music Ltd – TRM005; Format: Digital download, CD
The Healing	Released: 23 May 2025; Label: Tis Rock Music Ltd – TRM006; Format: Digital download, CD
