= King King (band) =

British blues rock band

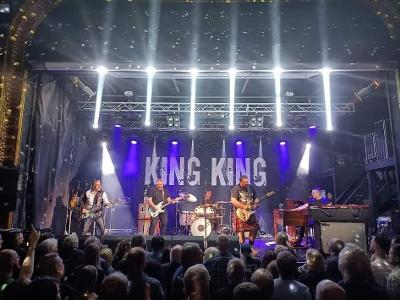

Background information
- Origin: Lincoln, England
- Genres: Blues rock
- Years active: 2008–present
- Members: Alan Nimmo; Stevie Nimmo; Jonny Dyke; Zander Greenshields; Jon Lodge
- Past members: Andrew Scott; Wayne Proctor; Lindsay Coulson; Bennett Holland; Bob Fridzema
- Website: www.kingking.co.uk

King King is a British blues rock group, formed in 2008 by Alan Nimmo and Lindsay Coulson, both formerly of The Nimmo Brothers. The band has released five studio albums and one live album to date. The current line up of King King is Alan Nimmo (guitar and lead vocals), Stevie Nimmo (guitar and vocals), Jonny Dyke (keyboards), Zander Greenshields (bass) and Jon Lodge (drums).

Their name comes from a former blues club, King King in Los Angeles, which burnt down and was immortalised in a live album by The Red Devils.

== History ==
King King was formed in the summer of 2008 in Glasgow, Scotland. with the line up of Alan Nimmo (guitar/vocals), Lindsay Coulson (bass), Dale Storr (keyboards) and Dave Raeburn (drums). Their first gig was on 19 July 2008 at Rock Haven in Lincoln. Their first record release was in December 2008, entitled Broken Heal, it was a four track EP on Superb Duck Records, consisting of three self-penned numbers and a cover of the Luther Ingram song, "(If Loving You Is Wrong) I Don't Want to be Right".

After building up a solid fan base over the succeeding months, the band appeared at two blues festivals in the summer of 2009. The first was at the Blues on the Farm Festival in Chichester, in June 2009, followed by an appearance at the Maryport Blues Festival in July 2009. At this festival, BBC Radio 2 DJ Paul Jones interviewed both Alan Nimmo and Lindsay Coulson for his blues show, which was broadcast on 31 August 2009. Four months later, on 14 December 2009, King King played their first full session on the Paul Jones Show, the first of several sessions. Having signed to Alan Robinson Management in August 2009, the band began recording sessions for their debut album in 2010. Also, in that year, the band played at the Monaghan Rhythm and Blues Festival in Ireland. Such was the positive reception to their set, that festival organiser, Somhairle MacGognil remarked, "King King aren't just playing the festival. King King are the festival!"

King King's debut album, Take My Hand, was released on 28 March 2011 on Manhaton Records. The album featured two drummers, Craig Blundell and Wayne Proctor (Aynsley Lister), (who would later become the band's permanent drummer). Keyboards were shared between Dale Storr and Bennett Holland. The album was released under the moniker of "King King featuring Alan Nimmo", as were the band's gigs at this time. At the Newark Blues Festival in 2012, the album won the British Blues Album award, whilst the band themselves won the Best British Blues Band award.

After relentless touring over the next year, including regular visits to Europe, the band released their second album Standing In The Shadows, in March 2013. The first gig ever in Germany took place at the famous topos Club in Leverkusen on 30 November 2012. Wayne Proctor and Bennett Holland were now the sole drummer and keyboard players, respectively, on this album. One of the highlights of 2013 for King King was playing at the world famous Ottawa Bluesfest in Canada on the River Stage, as well as an appearance on the TV show, Canada AM.

At the 2014 British Blues Awards, King King won five awards including the Best Band and Best Album Awards. King King played for Rockpalast on 29 March 2014 at the Harmonie Bonn Now one of the trademarks of King King's stage show was Glaswegian Alan Nimmo wearing a kilt on stage, a tradition which continues to this day. In 2014, Bennett Holland left the band to be replaced by Bob Fridzema on keyboards. In the autumn of 2014, the band embarked on a 34-date tour of the UK supporting John Mayall. On some of the dates Mayall joined King King on stage to perform together, notably on Every Day I Have the Blues and Hideaway.

The following year, 2015, King King's third studio album, Reaching for the Light was released in May. The band again won several awards including Best British Blues Album of 2016 for this album and King King were nominated for the Best New Band award in the Classic Rock Roll of Honour.

In January 2016, the band flew out to India to play at the Mahindra Blues Festival in Mumbai alongside Keb' Mo' and Joss Stone. Then in February 2016 the band supported Thunder on an arena tour of the UK, including a show at London's Wembley Arena. This was followed by a live recording of two gigs at the Picturedrome, Holmfirth, Yorkshire on 12 and 13 April for a live CD and DVD. Although the first night's show was intended for a live CD, this was abandoned due to technical problems. The show on 13 April was, however, used for the DVD. Instead, the show at the O_{2} ABC Glasgow, Scotland on 14 May 2016 was recorded for the live CD release. The resulting recordings came out as King King Live in October 2016. The CD + DVD set won the award for Best Live Album of 2016 in the annual Blues Awards. It also gave the band their first entry into the UK Albums Chart, peaking at number 86, as well as reaching the number 1 spot on the Amazon Blues Chart.

In August 2016, vocalist Alan Nimmo underwent an operation to remove polyps from his vocal chords. With the recovery taking longer than expected several club and festival dates had to be rescheduled over the next twelve months. On his recovery King King were featured on Vintage TV's Friday Night Rock Show, broadcast on 1 May 2017. The band played three numbers, "Waking Up", "Rush Hour" and "You Stopped The Rain", whilst Alan Nimmo was interviewed by host, Nicky Horne. At this time, Bob Fridzema was replaced by Jonny Dyke (James Morrison, Patricia Kaas, Elkie Brooks) on keyboards.

King King's fourth studio album, Exile & Grace was released in October 2017. It was mixed by Chris Sheldon, who had previously worked with The Foo Fighters, Feeder and Therapy? It reached number 31 in the UK Albums Chart and number 1 in the Amazon Blues Chart and the Official Jazz/Blues Chart. It was also awarded the No 1 Blues album of 2017 award by Classic Rock magazine. The UK tour to promote the album was put back from October 2017 to January 2018. On this tour the band played their largest venues to date as a headline act, including the Shepherd's Bush Empire in London. In September 2018, King King toured the UK, Ireland and mainland Europe as guests of the Swedish rock band, Europe. The tour included a date at the Royal Albert Hall in London. King King finished the year by winning the Best Band award at the European Blues Awards.

In January 2019, it was announced that King King had left Alan Robinson Management and signed a management deal with Siren Artist Management Inc of Los Angeles, United States, starting on 1 January 2019. This later ended when King King decided to manage themselves.

King King undertook a British tour in January and February 2019, celebrating the band's tenth anniversary of formation. At the last gig of the tour at Glasgow's 02 Academy, bassist Lindsay Coulson played his final gig with King King, leaving Alan Nimmo as the only remaining original member of King King. At the same gig his replacement was introduced to the audience. He is Zander Greenshields who has played previously with Alan Nimmo in the Nimmo Brothers. A few weeks later, on the band's Facebook page, it was announced that drummer Wayne Proctor had left King King. His replacement is Edinburgh based drummer, Andrew Scott who is a graduate of the Berklee College of Music in Boston, Massachusetts.

The new line up of King King made its live debut at the Casino de Saint Julien en Genevois, France on 27 March 2019, followed by two more shows in France. The first British show performed by the new line up was at the Picturedrome, Holmfirth, Yorkshire on 10 May 2019. The band then played some festival dates in Europe during the summer, including taking part on the "Keeping the Blues Alive" cruise on the Mediterranean Sea in August 2019, with Joe Bonamassa and Peter Frampton. They then started work on their fifth album in the autumn of 2019, continuing into the early months of 2020. The first single from the new album, was released in February 2020. It was called "I Will Not Fall" and was accompanied by a video. In an interview for Blues Rock Review, Alan Nimmo said that the album was scheduled to be released by the end of September 2020. The band's UK tour scheduled to start at Cardiff Y Plas on 3 April 2020, was postponed and rescheduled for February 2021. All these were eventually put back a year to the autumn of 2021, with guest performances by When Rivers Meet.

On 11 April 2020, Alan Nimmo took part in the Lockdown Sessions broadcast on Planet Rock Radio, where he performed five songs accompanied on an acoustic guitar. Five days later on 16 April 2020, the band announced that Stevie Nimmo, the brother of Alan Nimmo would be joining the group as its fifth member. It was also announced that Stevie had been involved in the recording of King King's fifth album. On 29 May 2020, Alan Nimmo in a special video, announced that King King's Fifth studio album would be called Maverick. It was due to be released on 16 October 2020 on the band's own label, Channel 9 Music, however due to problems with the cover artwork the album eventually came out on 30 November 2020. It reached number 77 in the UK Albums Chart.

The band's return to the stage in the UK was at the Holmfirth Picturedrome, West Yorkshire on 7 August 2021.

In summer 2024, Andrew Scott left the band to be replaced by Jon Lodge (Voodoo Six, Paul Di'Anno, Catrin Finch, Biomechanical).

== Discography ==
=== Studio albums ===
- 2011 – Take My Hand (Manhaton Records) (Hatman 2026)
- 2013 – Standing In the Shadows (Manhaton Records) (Hatman 2031)
- 2015 – Reaching For the Light (Manhaton Records) (Hatman 2038)
- 2017 – Exile & Grace (Manhaton Records) (Hatman 2048)
- 2020 – Maverick (Channel 9 Music) (CHAN9002)

=== Live albums ===
- 2016 – King King Live (2 x CD and DVD) (Manhaton Records) (Hatman 2045)
- 2020 - Live & Acoustic (6 track CD EP) (Channel 9 Music) (CHAN9011)

=== Extended plays ===
- 2008 – Broken Heal (4 track CD EP) – (Superb Duck Records) ( SDRCD0001)
- 2017 – Outtakes & Rarities (3 track CD EP) – (Manhaton Records) (Hatman 1010)
