= Kim Ian Parker =

Canadian scholar

- Born: 1956 (age 69–70)

Academic background
- Education: McMaster University
- Thesis: Narrative Tension in I Kings 1–11 (1988)
- Doctoral advisor: A. Eugene Combs; A. M. Cooper
- Influences: John Locke

Academic work
- Discipline: Religious studies
- Sub-discipline: Biblical studies; Enlightenment philosophy; political philosophy
- Institutions: Memorial University of Newfoundland

Kim Ian Parker (born 1956) is a Canadian religious studies scholar, who serves as a professor at Memorial University of Newfoundland. He is known for his research on the Bible and the works of John Locke. Parker has held various grants from the Social Sciences and Humanities Research Council.

== Books ==
- An Introduction to the Hebrew Bible/Old Testament, Linus Publications, 2014
- The Biblical Politics of John Locke, Wilfrid Laurier University Press, 2004
- Wisdom and Law in the Reign of Solomon, Lewiston, New York: Edwin Mellen Press, 1994
- Liberal Democracy and the Bible (ed.), Lewiston, New York: Edwin Mellen Press, 1993
- Text and Tradition: A Guide to the Old Testament, Trinity Press, 1990
