= Matt Schofield =

English guitarist and singer

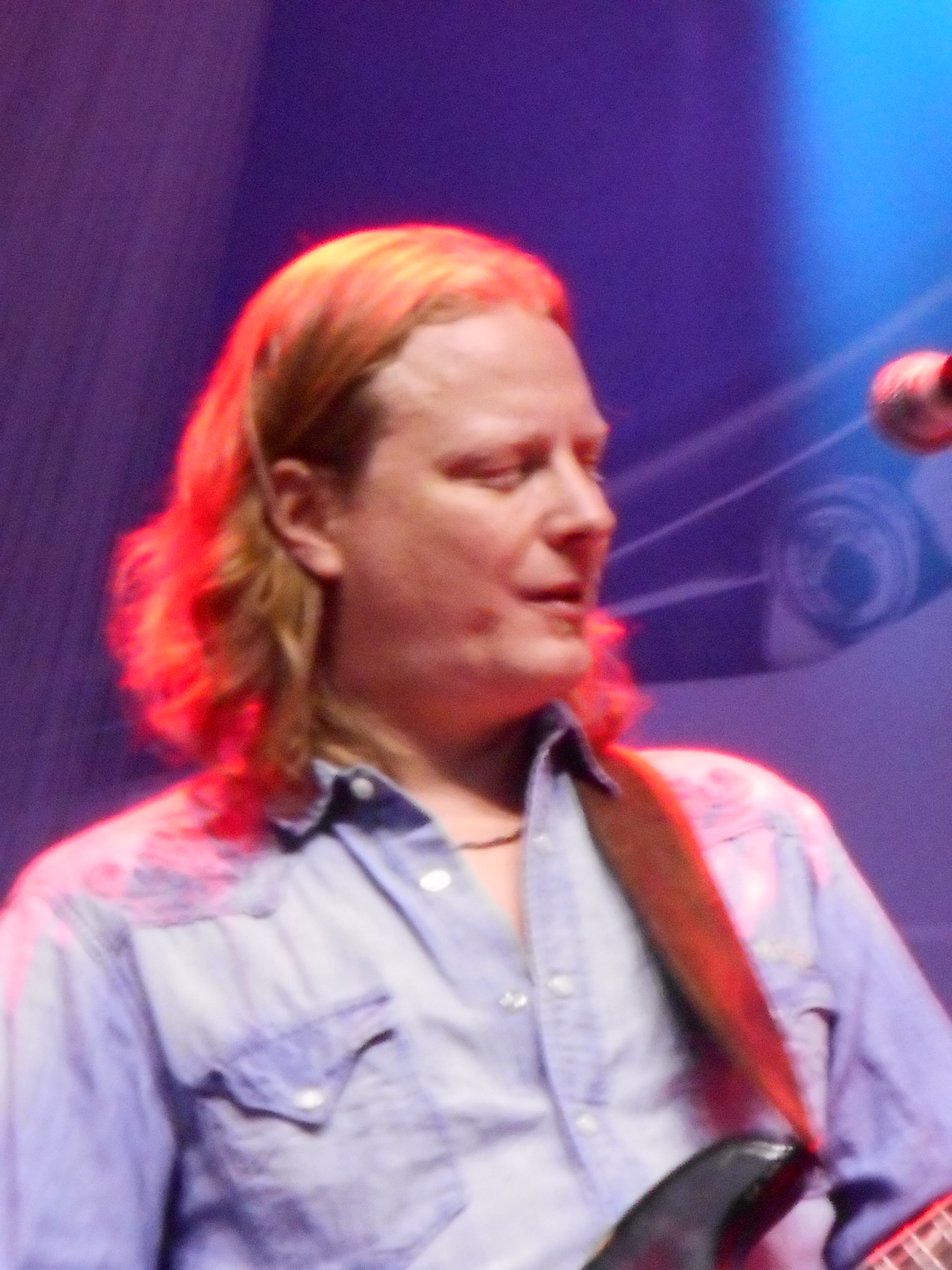
- Matt Schofield in 2016.

Background information
- Born: Matthew Schofield; 21 August 1977 (age 49)
- Origin: Manchester, England
- Genres: British blues, electric blues, blues rock, jam band
- Occupations: Musician, songwriter, record producer
- Instruments: Guitar, vocals
- Years active: 2000–present
- Label: Nugene Records
- Website: Matt Schofield official website

Matt Schofield (born 21 August 1977, Manchester, England) is an English blues guitarist and singer. His band, the Matt Schofield Trio, play their own material, a blend of blues, funk and jazz, as well as covers of blues classics such as Albert Collins' "Lights Are On, But Nobody's Home".

Schofield is regarded as one of the most distinctive and innovative British blues guitarists, and has been rated in the top ten of British blues guitarists by Guitar & Bass Magazine. Schofield's prowess has taken his band to twelve countries, seen him playing with musicians including Buddy Guy and Robben Ford, and brought a note in the Penguin Book of Blues Recordings as one of only two living British artists to gain the maximum four-star rating. In addition, he has been admitted to the British Blues Awards Hall of Fame.

== Influences ==
Schofield's guitar playing is often likened to that of Robben Ford in its melodic and fluid style, and jazzy lines.

Schofield has been influenced by B.B. King, Freddie King, Albert King, Muddy Waters, Steve Winwood, Eric Clapton, Albert Collins, Jimi Hendrix, Billy Gibbons, Stevie Ray Vaughan, Jimmie Vaughan, and Tomo Fujita.

== Career ==
=== Recordings ===
Schofield has recorded five studio albums and four live albums. The first of the live discs, The Trio, Live was recorded at the Bishop's Blues club at The Half Moon, Bishop's Stortford in 2004 and, funded and released by Richard Pavitt on his Nugene record label, gave the band their first breakthrough. The first studio album, Siftin' Thru Ashes was released in 2005. This album showcased Schofield as a songwriter, writing or co-writing eight out of eleven of the tracks. AllMusic called Schofield's approach "an enjoyable demonstration of what can happen when blues-rock and blues-jazz are united". The second live album, Live at the Jazz Cafe! was recorded at the London Jazz Cafe in April 2005, and was made available as a web only release. Schofield is one of only two living British artists to be given a four star (excellent) rating in the Penguin Book of Blues Recordings.

The release of The Trio, Live prompted Schofield to be featured in a Guitarist magazine article, listing the nine notable up and coming blues guitarists, Schofield being the only non-American. Of the album they said "britblues meets jazz via N'Orleans – all played with the kind of sizzling guitar that just does not often surface in Fairford, Gloucestershire". In 2007, Guitar & Bass Magazine picked Schofield as one of the "Top 10 British Blues Guitarists of All Time". In August 2009, Schofield released Heads, Tails, & Aces, his third studio effort. The next year (2010) the band collected the Album of the Year award at the British Blues Awards for this album, and released Live from the Archive, recorded in 2007 in the Netherlands. Schofield won the British Blues Guitarist and Jonny Henderson won the British Keyboard Player award, and they both won these awards in 2011, too.

In 2011, the trio released their fourth album Anything but Time, with Kevin Hayes on drums and John Porter as record producer. Guitarinstructor.com, a part of the Hal Leonard organisation, has this album as No 5 in their top 10 albums of 2011, while Mojo magazine picked it as No 1 of Blues albums in 2011.

In 2012, Schofield made available a third live album Ten From The Road, consisting of material performed live in November 2011 by Schofield with Henderson & Hayes.

He released his fifth studio album, called Far As I Can See, in February 2014.

Schofield has played guitar for a number of Dana Gillespie's albums, including Back to the Blues (1998), Experienced (2000), Songs of Love (2001), Staying Power (2002), These Blue Nights (2006), and Live With the London Blues Band (2007), and with The Lee Sankey Group's My Day Is Just Beginning (2000) and She's Not Alone (EP) (2000). He has also played guitar on Dino Baptiste's Two Timing Lover Boy (1999), The Lester Butler Tribute Band's So Lowdown Tour (2002), Earl Green's A Different Picture (2005), The Backbones' New Road Sessions Vol. 1 (2006), JL Fulks' On Down the Road (2016), and Federico Luiu's Walkin' The Blues. He co-produced Ian Siegal's Meat & Potatoes (2005) and produced Siegal's At The North Sea Jazz Festival (DVD) (2006), Swagger (2007), and Broadside (2009). Schofield appears on the compilation albums Mustique Blues Festival (1999, 2000, 2004), Basil´s Bar Blues (2003), and The Six Sessions (2010).

In 2025, Schofield released Many Moons, Vol. 1, an album he recorded with his original Trio (Jonny Henderson on B3 organ, and Evan Jenkins on drums). The album was recorded at Peter Gabriel's studio, Real World, live, over a few days.

=== Band ===
Schofield performs with an organ trio (guitar, organ, and drums). Organ trios are mostly associated with the 1950s and 1960s US soul jazz groups led by organists such as Jimmy Smith. Blues bands more commonly use trios of guitar, bass and drums, quartets (guitar, keyboards, bass, and drums) or quintets (guitar, rhythm guitar, keyboards, bass, and drums). In Schofield's organ trio, organist Jonny Henderson plays a Hammond organ, performing basslines using his left hand, and playing chords and lead lines with his right hand. The trio's drummer is Evan Jenkins. Jeff Walker played bass on the final track of Siftin' Thru' Ashes. In 2009, as of the recording of Heads, Tails & Aces, The Matt Schofield Trio became The Matt Schofield Band, a four-piece, featuring Jeff 'The Funk' Walker on bass, and also replacing Evan Jenkins with Alain Baudry. Jeff Walker was later replaced by Spanish bassist Javier Garcia Vicente. At a concert at the Swindon Arts Centre on 22 October 2009, the band reverted to a trio. In June 2010, Kevin Hayes, replaced Evan Jenkins in the band. The 2012 Europe Tour, the trio was back with its original formation, with Matt Schofield, Evan Jenkins and Jonny Henderson.

=== Endorsements and gear ===
Boutique amplifier company Two-Rock developed the Schofield Signature amplifier for him. According to Schofield, the amplifier is "simply the best amplifier I've ever plugged into, and I'm honoured it carries my name". Most recently since Two-Rock changed hands to the current owners, Matt has been playing amps from the new lineup, namely the Classic Reverb Signature, the Vintage Deluxe, the Silver Sterling Signature, and has been seen borrowing Eli Lester's (Two-Rock's CEO) TS1.

Matt mostly plays two vintage Fender Stratocasters; a 1961 3-tone Sunburst that he has owned for several years, and his most recent acquisition, a 1963 refinished in Olympic White. He uses and is an endorser of Curt Mangan Strings.

Japanese effects pedal company Free The Tone developed the MS SOV SPECIAL overdrive pedal for him and released it as a limited edition product in 2013. A full production version, the MS SOV MS-2V, was later released in 2014.

Most recently though, Matt has been using other pedals. His signature Mad Professor pedal, the Supreme, has been his main overdrive for several years. He has also used a Vemuram Jan Ray, a Klon Centaur, a King Tone Duelist, a Drybell Unit 67, a Vemuram Budi G, and some others. For modulation, he uses a bit of harmonic tremolo with the JAM Pedals Harmonious Monk. And lastly, a very important part of his sound is the Mad Professor Deep Blue Delay, which he uses always on, as a sort of slap back delay.

== Discography ==
- 2004: The Trio, Live (NUG601)
- 2005: Live at the Jazz Café (NUG503)
- 2005: Siftin' Thru' Ashes (NUG501)
- 2007: Ear to the Ground
- 2007: Live from the Archive
- 2009: Heads, Tails & Aces
- 2010:Live From The Archive
- 2011: Anything But Time
- 2012: Ten From The Road
- 2014: Far As I Can See
- 2025: Many Moons / Vol.1
