= British Blues Awards =

British music awards

The British Blues Awards were inaugurated in 2010. The prize was awarded in various categories, such as 'Male Vocals', 'Female Vocals', 'Guitarist', 'Bass Player' and 'Keyboard Player', 'Blues Band', 'Young Artist', 'Blues Album', 'Blues Festival' and 'Lifetime Achievement'.

The Awards were suspended in 2017, due to technical problems surrounding the validity of the online public voting system, which over time had become susceptible to abuse.

== British Blues Awards Hall of Fame ==
The entrants to the "British Blues Awards Hall of Fame", who have won a category three years in a row, are shown below. Members of the Hall of Fame can no longer be nominated for the British Blues Awards in the respective category.

- Matt Schofield – Guitarist 2010–2012
- Andy Graham – Bass player 2010–2012
- Paul Jones – Harmonica player 2010–2012
- Joe Bonamassa – Overseas artist 2010–2012
- Ian Siegal – Male vocals 2011–2013
- The Paul Jones Rhythm and Blues Show – Blues broadcaster 2011 (exception to the three-year rule)
- Hebden Bridge – Blues festival 2012–2014
- King King – Band 2012–2014

== Awards ==
The following is a list in chronological order of the award winners in the various categories.

=== Male Vocals ===
- 2010: Oli Brown
- 2011: Ian Siegal
- 2012: Ian Siegal
- 2013: Ian Siegal
- 2014: Alan Nimmo
- 2015: Alan Nimmo
- 2016: Alan Nimmo

=== Female Vocals ===
- 2010: Joanne Shaw Taylor
- 2011: Joanne Shaw Taylor
- 2012: Chantel McGregor
- 2013: Chantel McGregor
- 2014: Jo Harman
- 2015: Dani Wilde
- 2016: Rebecca Downes

=== Blues Band ===
- 2010: Ian Siegal Band
- 2011: Oli Brown Band
- 2012: King King
- 2013: King King
- 2014: King King
- 2015: The Nimmo Brothers
- 2016: The Nimmo Brothers

=== Harmonica Player ===
- 2010: Paul Jones
- 2011: Paul Jones
- 2012: Paul Jones
- 2013: Paul Lamb
- 2014: Paul Lamb
- 2015: Paul Lamb
- 2016: Mark Feltham

=== Guitarist ===
- 2010: Matt Schofield
- 2011: Matt Schofield
- 2012: Matt Schofield
- 2013: Chantel McGregor
- 2014: Chantel McGregor
- 2015: Aynsley Lister
- 2016: Laurence Jones

=== Acoustic Act ===
- 2012: Ian Siegal
- 2013: Marcus Bonfanti
- 2014: Marcus Bonfanti
- 2015: Ian Siegal
- 2016: Ian Siegal

=== Bass Player ===
- 2010: Andy Graham
- 2011: Andy Graham
- 2012: Andy Graham
- 2013: Lindsay Coulson
- 2014: Lindsay Coulson
- 2015: Norman Watt-Roy
- 2016: Lindsay Coulson

=== Keyboard Player ===
- 2010: Jonny Henderson
- 2011: Jonny Henderson
- 2012: Paddy Milner
- 2013: Bennett Holland
- 2014: Steve Watts
- 2015: Paddy Milner
- 2016: Paul Long

=== Drummer ===
- 2010: Simon Dring
- 2011: Wayne Proctor
- 2012: Stephen Cutmore
- 2014: Wayne Proctor
- 2015: Wayne Proctor
- 2015: Wayne Proctor
- 2016: Andrew Naumann

=== Instrumentalist ===
- 2010: Son Henry
- 2011: Son Henry
- 2012: Becky Tate
- 2013: Becky Tate
- 2014: Sarah Skinner (Red Dirt Skinners)
- 2015: Becky Tate
- 2016: Becky Tate

=== Young Artist ===
- 2010: Oli Brown
- 2011: Chantel McGregor
- 2012: Oli Brown
- 2013: Dan Owen / Lucy Zirins
- 2014: Laurence Jones
- 2015: Laurence Jones
- 2016: Laurence Jones

=== Blues Festival ===
- 2010: Blues on the Farm
- 2011: Great British Rhythm and Blues Festival
- 2012: Hebden Bridge Blues Festival
- 2013: Hebden Bridge Blues Festival
- 2014: Hebden Bridge Blues Festival
- 2015: Upton Blues Festival
- 2016: Upton Blues Festival

=== Overseas Artist ===
- 2010: Joe Bonamassa
- 2011: Joe Bonamassa
- 2012: Joe Bonamassa
- 2013: Walter Trout
- 2014: Walter Trout
- 2015: Walter Trout
- 2016: Buddy Guy

=== Blues Broadcaster ===
- 2011: Paul Jones

(Category replaced as below)

=== Independent blues broadcaster ===
- 2012: Gary Grainger
- 2013: Dave Raven
- 2014: Dave Watkins
- 2015: Dave Raven
- 2016: Paul Long

=== Lifetime Achievement ===
- 2010: Colin Staples
- 2011: Paul Jones
- 2012: Paul Oliver
- 2013: Mike Vernon / Barry Middleton
- 2014: Philip Guy Davis / Bill & Joyce Harrison
- 2015: Paul Dean New Crawdaddy Club
- 2016: Pete Feenstra

=== Blues Album ===
- 2010: Heads, Tails & Aces – Matt Schofield
- 2011: Heads I Win Tails You Lose – Oli Brown
- 2012: Take My Hand – King King
- 2013: Candy Store Kid – Ian Siegal and the Mississippi Mudbloods
- 2014: Standing in the Shadows – King King
- 2015: Going Back Home – Wilko Johnson and Roger Daltrey
- 2016: Reaching For The Light – King King

=== Kevin Thorpe Award for Songwriter of the Year ===
- 2011: Joanne Shaw Taylor for "Same As It Never Was"
- 2012: Marcus Bonfanti for "The Bittersweet"
- 2013: Ian Siegal for "I Am The Train"
- 2014: Aynsley Lister
- 2015: Katie Bradley and Dudley Ross
- 2016: King King

=== Song ===
- 2014: "Home" – Aynsley Lister
- 2015: "Mud Honey" – Joanne Shaw Taylor
- 2016: "Rush Hour" – King King

=== Barry Middleton Memorial Award for Emerging Artist ===
- 2014: King Size Slim
- 2015: Kaz Hawkins
- 2016: Rebecca Downes

=== British Blues Great ===
- 2015: John Mayall and Chris Barber
- 2016: Papa George and The Hoax

== See also ==
- British blues
