= Aynsley Lister =

British blues-rock guitarist/singer and songwriter

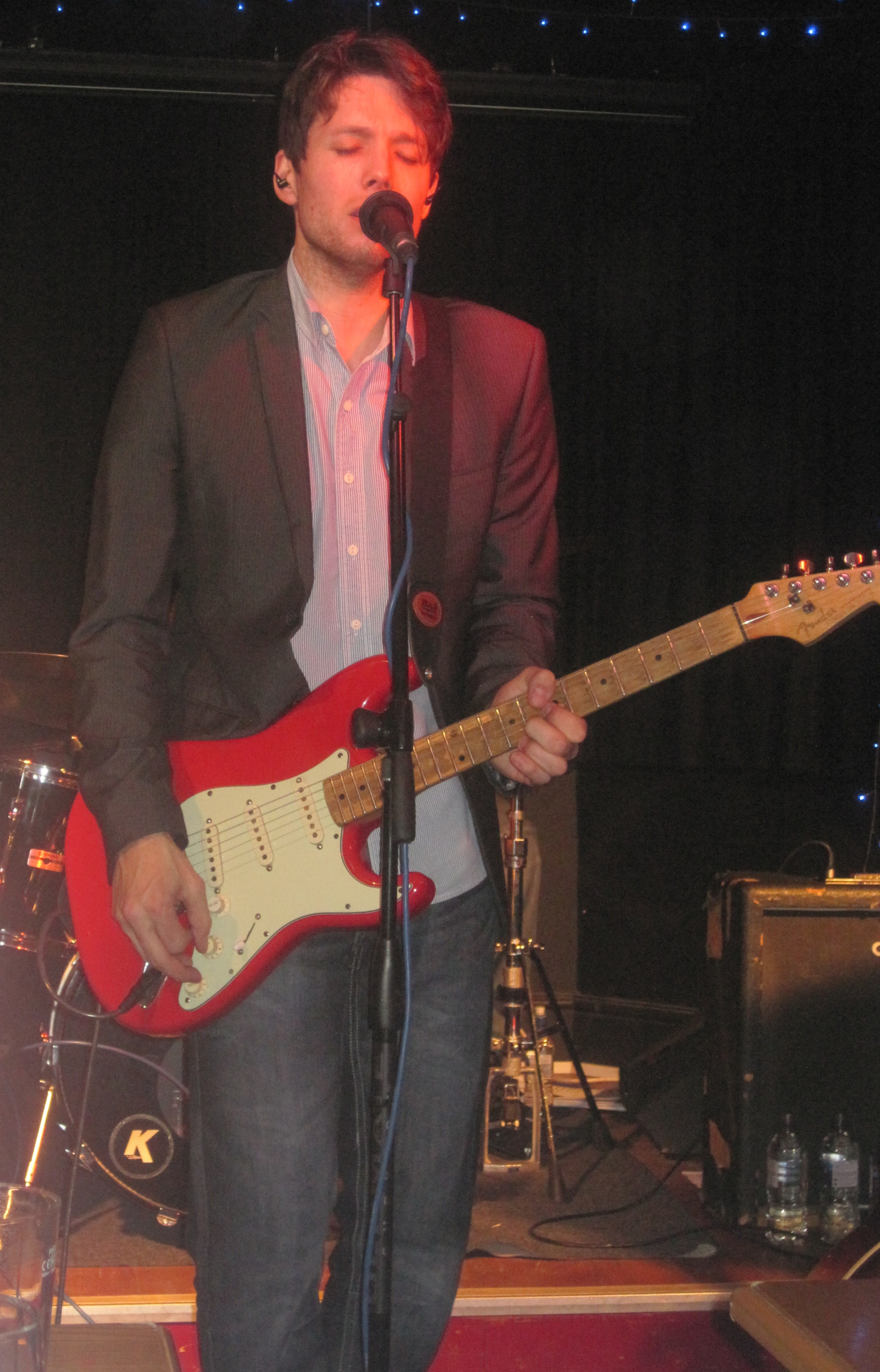
- Aynsley Lister (2012)

Background information
- Born: 14 November 1976 (age 49); Leicester, England
- Genres: Blues, rock and roll, blues-rock
- Occupations: Guitarist, singer, songwriter
- Instruments: Guitar, vocals
- Years active: 1995–present
- Website: Aynsleylister.co.uk

Aynsley Lister (born 14 November 1976 in Leicester, England) is a British blues-rock guitarist/singer and songwriter.

== Biography ==
Lister started playing guitar at 8 and played his first concert in a bar band at the age of 13. He had learned guitar by playing along to his father's old 45s of Freddie King, John Mayall and Eric Clapton. By the time he was 18, having already been in several bands, he formed his own, which recorded two albums Messin' With The Kid (1996) and Pay Attention! (1997). Three numbers written by Lister, on the second album, attracted the attention of Ruf Records' owner Thomas Ruf. In 1998 they signed a record deal and Lister recorded his first major album, Aynsley Lister, produced by Jim Gaines. The tracks were primarily Lister compositions, and the album featured a guest appearance by Walter Trout. The album led to him touring Europe and working with some of the top current blues players.

While Lister's music is blues based, his own material incorporates contemporary influences with harder rhythms and guitar work, reminiscent of early Eric Clapton. Lister was the only British artist to be featured in Classic Rock's 2007 "Top 10 Contemporary Blues Artists"; alongside The White Stripes, The Black Keys, John Mayer, Jon Spencer, Jonny Lang, Kenny Wayne Shepherd, Joe Bonamassa, Derek Trucks and the North Mississippi Allstars.

After his first album Lister began opening for artists such as Buddy Guy, Robert Cray, John Mayall and contemporaries such as Bryan Adams and Fun Lovin Criminals. Having become better known, he now headlines major festivals in Europe. He has twice played the Heitere Open Air in Switzerland to 12,000 people and, in 2006, he played the main stage at The Bayfront Blues Festival, Minnesota. Later that year he was invited to sit in with Delbert McClinton at The Pinedale Blues Festival in Wyoming, where McClinton kept Lister on stage for the whole second half of his show. In May 2009, Lister played to over 16,000 people whilst opening for Lynyrd Skynyrd on the UK dates of their God and Guns tour, performed a headline slot at Glastonbury in 2010 and during the same year, shared the stage with ZZ Top at the Skånevik Bluesfestival in Norway.

Lister has also recorded with Jesse Davey from the English blues band The Hoax on Everything I Need (2000) and All Or Nothing (2002) both produced by Greg Haver (Manic Street Preachers, Catatonia). Everything I Need was his debut US release in 2006, in preparation for a US tour, and received critical acclaim. Lister's fourth studio album, and his first to only contain original material, was 2007's Upside Down which Lister produced himself.

In June 2008, Lister changed to ARM Management and signed to Manhaton Records in August 2008, releasing Equilibrium in March 2009. Equilibrium was produced by Steve Darrel Smith and features Robbie McIntosh, Paul Beavis and Simon Johnson. Following Equilibrium, he and his band relocated to the Tower Arts Centre and with the tape rolling, nailed a rendition of their live set to produce Tower Sessions record, which was released on Manhaton Records in 2010 and consequently voted 'Best Live Album' in the 2011 Blues Matters Writers Poll.

In August 2014, Lister won two awards for "Best Songwriter" and "Best Song“ (for Home) in the British Blues Awards and came runner up for three more; "Best Guitarist", "Best Male Vocalist" and "Best Album“ (for Home).

For the tenth album of his career to date, Home (2013), Lister has flown the nest of being under contract with anyone but himself. Home was the debut release for his own label, Straight Talkin' Records, set up in partnership with his wife and manager, Stephanie Lister in the same year.

== Collaborative projects ==
The Blues Caravan is an annual Ruf Records project which brings together three of the label's artists. In 2006 the artists were Lister, Ian Parker and Erja Lyytinen from Finland who created the album Pilgrimage. The concept was for each artist to write a group of songs which they would complete and record in New Orleans, Clarksdale and Memphis, so that their songwriting would reflect and be shaped by the blues heritage of those musical towns. Unfortunately Hurricane Katrina prevented them visiting New Orleans and the album was created at Delta Recording Studios, Clarksdale and Ardent Studios in Memphis, where Jim Gaines was the producer. The trio spent much of 2006 touring Europe and America, including the Gladstone Summertime Bluesfest, where they played a two and a half-hour show.

In 2015, Lister featured on the album Reflections by UK based rock group The Mentulls, playing guitar on the track "Time To Focus". The track received airplay on BBC Radio 2.

== DVDs ==
Lister has released two DVDs. To complement the Live! album the show recorded by WDR Television for Rockpalast at the Crossroads Festival held in the Harmonie, Bonn on 23 March 2005 was released and contains three acoustics songs and a full band set.

Along with the Blues Caravan Pilgrimage album there is a DVD of the performance at the Underground in Cologne, Germany – again recorded by WDR Television for Rockpalast on 7 December 2005, and released as Blues Caravan – The Next Generation. This DVD features performances from each section of the show; each of the three members of the Blues Caravan individually and also their joint acoustic and electric sets of songs written for the Pilgrimage album. The DVD also features backstage footage and interviews.

== Other media ==
Lister has written a series of instructional articles for Guitarist magazine, and been invited by both Guitarist and Guitar Techniques magazines to present a series of instructional DVDs. He also regularly contributes to the specialist demonstration backing tracks on Bluesjamtracks, some of which can be seen on YouTube. In January 2013, Lister began his own "Guitar Weekends" in London. The first event sold out in less than a day and are now held annually, attracting guitarists from across Europe.

== Band ==
=== Current line up ===
- Aynsley Lister – Guitar; vocals
- Jono Martin – Bass; vocals (2016–present)
- Craig Bacon – Drums (2023–present)

=== Previous members ===
- André Bassing – Keyboards
- Boneto Dryden – Drums
- Steve Amadeo – Bass
- Andrew Price – Keyboards
- Dan Healey – Keyboards
- Midus Guerreiro – Bass; vocals
- Simon Small – Drums
- Paul Asbridge – Drums
- Rich Spooner – Drums
- Jo Nichols – Bass
- Alex Thomas – Drums
- Sarah Jones – Drums
- James Townend – Bass
- Wayne Proctor – Drums
- Paul Winterhart – Drums
- Colin Peters – Bass

== Discography ==
Studio albums

- Messin' With the Kid (1996) (as The Aynsley Lister Band)
- Pay Attention! (1997) (as The Aynsley Lister Band)
- Aynsley Lister (1999)
- Everything I Need (2000)
- All or Nothing (2002)
- Upside Down (2007)
- Equilibrium (2009)
- Home (2013)
- Eyes Wide Open (2016)
- Along for the Ride (2022)

Live albums

- Live! (2004)
- Tower Sessions (2010)

Collaboration albums

- Pilgrimage (2006) (with Ian Parker and Erja Lyytinen; part of the Ruf Records Blues Caravan project)
