= Ian Parker (singer-songwriter) =

English singer-songwriter

- Born: Ian James Parker; 13 December 1976 (age 49); Birmingham, England
- Genres: Blue-eyed soul, folk rock, blues-rock, acoustic rock
- Occupations: singer, songwriter, guitarist
- Instruments: Guitar, vocals
- Years active: 1989 – present
- Website: IanParkerMusic.com

Ian James Parker (born 13 December 1976) is an English singer-songwriter and guitarist in the genre of blues music.

== Early life ==
Born in Birmingham, England, Parker was brought up in nearby Stourbridge. He started playing the guitar as an eight year old and eight years later started a short-lived band called "Strange Brew" with two schoolfriends. After Strange Brew, he joined a blues band, "Blue Horizon". At the same time he was attending the University of Derby, graduating with a degree in psychology.

== Career ==
Moving back to Stourbridge, Parker started a new band, "Monty Turnball" with Morg' Morgan on keyboards, and two other local musicians with Parker on lead vocals and Stratocaster electric guitar. Morgan would continue in Parker's bands until 2010 when he gave up full-time performing to become a music teacher. Later, bass player Chris Lomas and drummer Tony Bayliss joined the band which was renamed "Parker's Alibi" in 1999. They became known in both the UK and Europe after becoming regulars on the European blues club circuits before disbanding in early 2002. Later that year, he formed "The Ian Parker Band" comprising Parker, Morgan, Amadeo on bass and Andy Edwards on drums (later replaced by Wayne Proctor).

In 2003, he signed to Ruf Records which made him known in the United States as well as Europe following a recommendation from Walter Trout who then took him on a European tour. He has also played with Eric Clapton, Jeff Beck, and Peter Green. The majority of Parker's music and lyrics are self composed with an original style. Andy Snipper of Music News considered that Parker " ... may be the great lost British soul singer". He has had long tours of Europe and the United States, such as the "Unique and Intimate Tour" in 2009/10 which included a set at the Bayfront Festival in Duluth, Minnesota.

In March 2004, he appeared on the German live music TV show, Rockpalast, and a live DVD of his performance was released in June 2005, entitled Whilst The Wind (Ruf3007).

== Discography ==
=== Studio albums ===
- Inside (2003)
- Where I Belong (2007)
- Demons And Doubters EP (2009)
- Politik Blues (2015)
- Spoonful of Gold for Old Willie

=== Live albums ===
- Lost & Found (2003)
- ...Whilst the Wind (2005)
- The Official Bootleg (2008)
- The Bare Bones (2011)

=== Single ===
- "Your Love Is My Home" (2007)

=== DVD ===
- …Whilst the Wind (Live) (2005)

=== Projects ===
- CD: Blues Caravan Pilgrimage (2005)
- DVD: Blues Caravan – The New Generation (Live) (2006)
- CD: Kinver - The Stone House (2013)

== Awards and honours ==
- In August 2006, in Dordrecht, The Netherlands, he received the Arrow Big Rivers Festival Award for 'Most Impressive Artist'.
