= Turquoise (Devon Allman album) =

Studio album by Devon Allman
- Released: February 12, 2013
- Recorded: 2012
- Studio: Bessie Blue, Memphis; Ardent, Memphis
- Genre: Blues rock
- Length: 41:52
- Label: Ruf Records
- Producer: Jim Gaines

Devon Allman chronology
Turquoise (2013)	Ragged & Dirty (2014)

Turquoise is a solo album by Devon Allman, released in February 2013. It features Yonrico Scott on drums (Allman's band-mate in Royal Southern Brotherhood) and Myles Weeks on bass, and includes guest musicians Luther Dickinson (guitar), Samantha Fish (vocals), Ron Holloway (saxophone) and Rick Steff (keyboard).

== Recording, production ==
In September 2012, Allman finished recording sessions for his first solo album. The sessions were recorded at Bessie Blue Studio and Ardent Studios, in Memphis, Tennessee, engineered by Pete Matthews and produced and mixed by Jim Gaines. Ron Holloway, who contributes saxophone on the song "Into the Darkness", also made a guest appearance on Allman's 2010 Honeytribe album, Space Age Blues.

The material on Turquoise is highly personal and reflects Allman's life on the road over the past decade. There are ten original songs, including two tunes co-written with Royal Southern Brotherhood band-mate Mike Zito. Songs "Homesick" and "When I Left Home" are autobiographical tales. "These songs are very special to me," says Allman in a press release for Turquoise. "It's part 'dusty road driving music' and part 'tropical getaway' music. These are the stories, feelings and reflections from my last couple of decades of forging my musical path."

== Track listing ==
All music and lyrics written by Devon Allman, except where noted.

No.	Title	Music	Length
1.	"When I Left Home"		4:05
2.	"Don't Set Me Free"	Devon Allman, Mike Zito	3:40
3.	"Time Machine"		3:39
4.	"Stop Draggin' My Heart Around" (cover: Stevie Nicks & Tom Petty)	Tom Petty, Mike Campbell	4:46
5.	"There's No Time"	Allman, Tyler Stokes	4:58
6.	"Strategy"	Allman, Zito	4:12
7.	"Homesick"		3:32
8.	"Into the Darkness"		3:24
9.	"Key Lime Pie"		3:04
10.	"Yadira's Lullaby"		2:25
11.	"Turn Off the World"		4:07

== Personnel ==
- Devon Allman – vocals and guitars
- Yonrico Scott – drums and percussion
- Myles Weeks – electric bass and upright bass

Additional artists

- Luther Dickinson – lead and slide guitars on "When I Left Home"
- Samantha Fish – vocals on "Stop Draggin' My Heart Around"
- Ron Holloway – saxophone on "Into the Darkness"
- Bobby Schneck Jr. – lead guitar on "Strategy"
- Rick Steff – Hammond B3 on "There's No Time", "Stop Draggin' My Heart Around", "Don't Set Me Free", and "Homesick"
- Pete Matthews, Rueben Williams, Samantha Fish, Adam Hill – background vocals on "Don't Set Me Free"

== Charts ==
Turquoise peaked at No. 5 on Billboard's Blues Albums chart the week of March 2, 2013.
