= Eliana Cargnelutti =

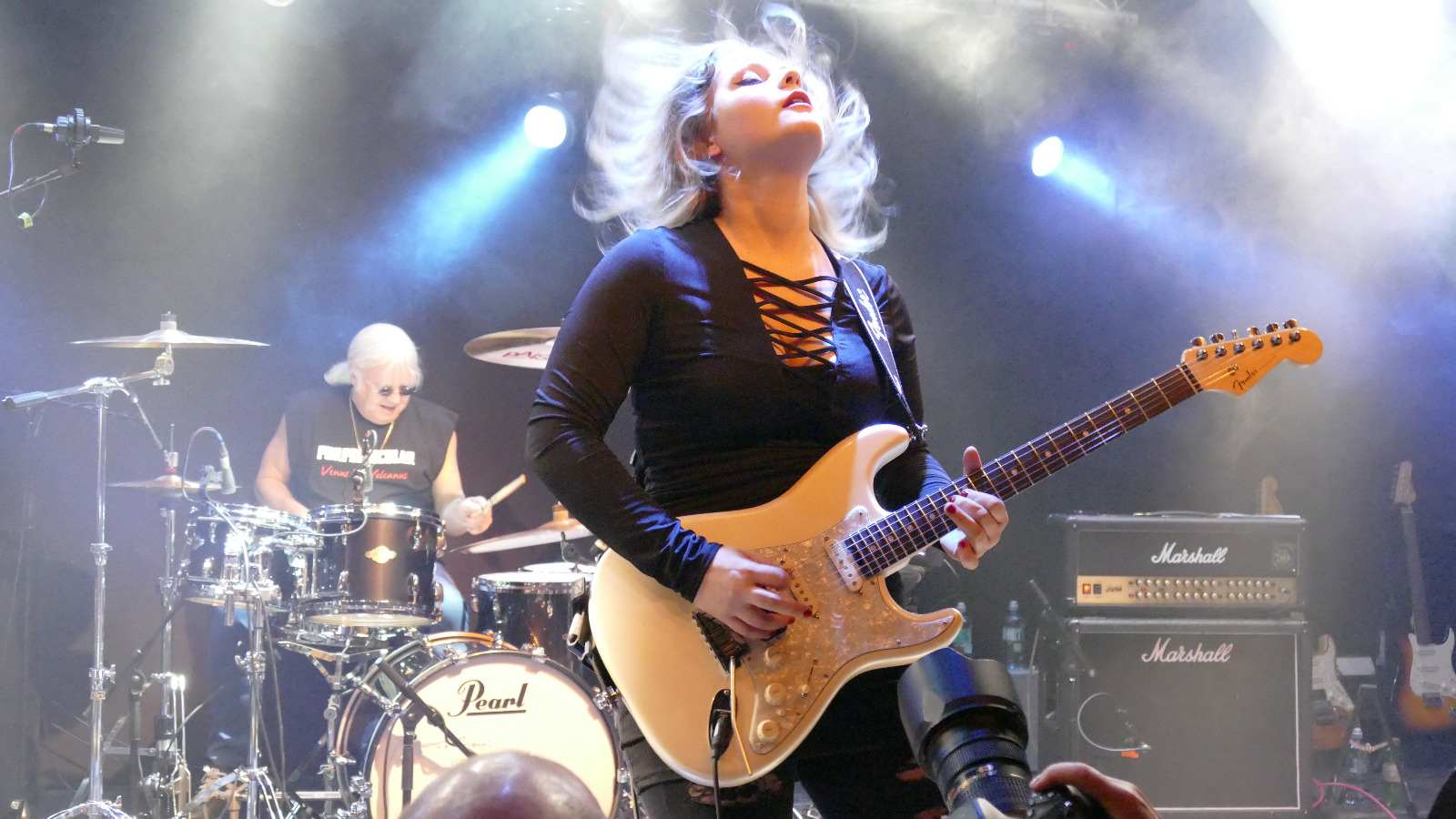
- Eliana Cargnelutti and Ian Paice (drums)

Background information
- Born: 28 July 1989 (age 36); Udine, Italy
- Genres: Blues rock
- Occupation(s): Singer, guitarist, songwriter
- Years active: 2010–present
- Website: Official website

Eliana Cargnelutti (born 28 July 1989) is an Italian blues rock singer, guitarist and songwriter. Cargnelutti has collaborated with various blues musicians including Scott Henderson, Ana Popovìc and Enrico Crivellaro. She has released four albums since 2013.

== Life and career ==
She was born in Udine, Italy and has spent most of her life there. At the age of nine she started to learn to play the guitar, having had some basic musical tuition prior to that point. When she was 14 years old she viewed an old video of a live performance by Stevie Ray Vaughan, which immediately inspired her to follow a blues rock style. Cargnelutti later achieved a Degree in Jazz Music and Jazz Guitar from the music university Conservatorio Girolamo Frescobaldi in Ferrara, Italy. In 2010, Cargnelutti won a "Blues Contest" in Pordenone, the same year she was granted a blues award as the 'best new young artist' at the "Oscar del Blues" in Modena, Italy. In 2013, she released her debut album, Love Affairs, billed as Miss Eliana. One of the eleven tracks on the collection, "The Musician", featured Scott Henderson on guitar.

In 2015, she released two albums. Electric Woman was recorded by Eliana Cargnelutti - vocals, guitars; Roger Inniss - bass; John Ginty - Hammond organ, piano; Jamie Little - drums; and Albert Castiglia - slide guitar. It was released on 27 February 2015, on Ruf Records, and was produced by Castiglia and Thomas Ruf. The recording contained the track, "I'm a Woman", which Joe Bonamassa suggested was placed on a list of eight recent songs "absolutely to hear". The second release of that year, Girls with Guitars, came on the back of Cargnelutti touring with two other female blues musicians, Heather Crosse and Sadie Johnson, under the international "Girls With Guitars" tag via Ruf Records' Blues Caravan banner. She was named one of the five "best female guitarists" in blues rock at the American Jimi Awards in 2015, and was nominated as the fifth best female guitar player of that genre by Blues E-news magazine.

Cargnelutti has also been involved with Living Dolls, an all-female cover band ensemble from north Italy, and with her acoustic trio: 3PLAY, who mostly operate in a club setting.

In 2019, Cargnelutti performed with Deep Purple's drummer, Ian Paice, in an Austrian concert with her own "Strange Kind of Women" project, an all-female Deep Purple tribute band. The same year, she toured in the United Kingdom with a project named Ladies Of The Blues. Cargnelutti stated, " Ladies Of the Blues will showcase three different ways to approach the blues with three distinctive style of playing blues, plus I shall be the only non-English artist performing". She later toured across Europe and the United States under her own name.

Her next album was released in May 2021. On the recording, Aur, there were guest appearances from Ana Popović and Eric Steckel. A reviewer noted that "it aligns the Italian guitarist more with the likes of Orianthi than, say, a hotter version of Joanne Shaw Taylor".

The third edition of Open Air Blues in the Garden Festival, in Dărmănești, Romania, in 2022, included artists such as Cargnelutti, Kyla Brox and Dan Patlansky.

In late 2022, Cargnelutti was called to attend the Blues Caravan 2022, the annual tour of the Ruf Records label, in place of Will Jacobs, playing all over Europe with Ghalia Volt and Katie Henry.

== Discography ==
=== Albums ===
Year	Title	Record label	Additional credits
2013	Love Affairs	VideoRadio Records	Miss Eliana
2015	Electric Woman	Ruf Records	
2015	Girls With Guitars	Ruf Records	Eliana Cargnelutti / Heather Crosse / Sadie Johnson
2021	Aur	Self-released	
