= Ride or Die (album) =

Studio album by Devon Allman
- Released: September 16, 2016
- Recorded: May 2016
- Studios: Sound Stage, Nashville; Switchyard, Nashville
- Genre: Blues rock
- Length: 48:13
- Label: Ruf Records
- Producers: Devon Allman; Tom Hambridge

Devon Allman chronology
Ragged & Dirty (2014)	Ride or Die (2016)	Miami Moon (2024)

Ride or Die is the third solo album by Devon Allman, released in 2016. The core lineup consisted of Tom Hambridge (drums), Tyler Stokes (guitars) and Steve Duerst (bass). Additional artists included Ron Holloway (saxophone), Bobby Yang (strings) and Kevin McKendree (keyboard).

== Recording, production ==
Ride or Die was recorded at Nashville’s Sound Stage Studios and Switchyard Studios in May, 2016. It was produced by Devon Allman, and co-produced, mixed and mastered by Tom Hambridge.

== Track listing ==
No.	Title	Music	Length
1.	"Say Your Prayers"	Devon Allman, Tyler Stokes	3:16
2.	"Find Ourselves"	Allman, Stokes	3:13
3.	"Galaxies"	Allman, Stokes	4:57
4.	"Lost"	Allman, Stokes	4:32
5.	"Shattered Times"	Tom Hambridge, Richard Fleming	3:33
6.	"Watch What You Say"	Allman, Stokes	4:20
7.	"Vancouver"	Allman	4:15
8.	"Pleasure & Pain"	Allman	4:09
9.	"Hold Me"	Allman	2:27
10.	"Live From the Hear"	Allman	4:50
11.	"Butterfly Girl"	Allman	4:35
12.	"A Night Like This" (cover: The Cure)	Robert Smith	4:21

== Personnel ==
- Devon Allman - guitars, vocals, bass on tracks 7–12
- Tom Hambridge - drums, percussion
- Tyler Stokes - guitars, bass on track 5
- Steve Duerst - bass on tracks 1–4 & 6
- Ron Holloway - saxophone
- Bobby Yang - violin, string section on track 7
- Kevin McKendree - keyboards

== Charts ==
Ride or Die debuted at No. 1 on Billboard's Blues Albums the week of October 8, 2016.
