= Lauren Anderson =

Lauren Anderson may refer to:

- Lauren Anderson (dancer) (born 1965), American ballet dancer
- Lauren Anderson (model) (born 1980), American model
- Lauren Anderson (musician), American singer-songwriter and guitarist
