= Royal Southern Brotherhood (album) =

Studio album by Royal Southern Brotherhood
- Released: May 8, 2012
- Recorded: December 2011
- Studio: Dockside Studio, Maurice, Louisiana
- Genre: Blues
- Length: 51:51
- Label: Ruf
- Producer: Jim Gaines, Ruben M. Williams, Thomas Ruf

Royal Southern Brotherhood chronology
Royal Southern Brotherhood (2012)	Songs from the Road: Live in Germany (2013)

Royal Southern Brotherhood is the debut studio album by American blues and blues rock group Royal Southern Brotherhood, released May 8, 2012. In support of the album, the band began an international tour on May 11, 2012, with shows in USA and Canada, as well as multiple countries in Europe.

The band members consist of: Cyril Neville, a Grammy Award winning singer and percussionist, former member of bands The Meters, the Neville Brothers and Galactic; Devon Allman, vocalist and guitarist from his band Honeytribe, who was featured on a top 10 hit in Europe with guitar master Javier Vargas; Mike Zito, vocalist and guitarist of his own band, which was nominated in 2009 and 2011 for the Blues Foundation’s 'Rock Blues Album of the Year' award; Yonrico Scott, drummer from Derek Trucks Band; and Charlie Wooton, bass guitar.

In 2009 Zito and Neville won the Blues Music Award 'Song of the Year' for "Pearl River", the title track to Zito's 2009 release.

== Recording ==
In December 2011, the band recorded the album during the course of five days at Dockside Studio, a 12-acre estate on the banks of Vermilion Bayou, in Maurice, Louisiana.

== Reception ==
Professional ratings
Review scores
Source	Rating
AllMusic	3/5 stars
Blues Rock Review	8/10
Classic Rock	8/10 stars
Music News.com	4/5 stars

Andy Snipper of Music News.com noted that "the album has music from all over the South, i.e. New Orleans funk, Atlanta hot Blues, and Memphis soul," and that "Cyril Neville is a great vocalist and his easy style and even tones set the stage for Allman’s incendiary guitar as well as Mike Zito’s more classic Blues style." Among the variety of songs, Snipper comments that "'Fired Up" is "a dark piece of Soul with a stunning solo from Allman", "Moonlight Over The Mississippi" has "a more New Orleans feel to it", and "Sweet Jelly Donut" is "a sassy piece of raunchy Blues with some fine slide and a seriously funky rhythm".

== Chart ==
The album debuted at No. 5 on the Billboard Blues Albums chart and No. 30 on the Billboard Heatseekers Albums chart.

== Track listing ==
No.	Title	Writer(s)	Length
1.	"New Horizon"	Cyril Neville, Mike Zito	4:50
2.	"Fired Up!"	Charlie Wooton, Neville	5:45
3.	"Left My Heart in Memphis"	Devon Allman	3:30
4.	"Moonlight over the Mississippi"	Neville, Zito	3:46
5.	"Fire on the Mountain"	Mickey Hart, Robert Hunter	4:57
6.	"Ways About You"	Neville, Zito	4:41
7.	"Gotta Keep Rockin'"	Allman, Neville	4:39
8.	"Nowhere to Hide"	Allman	2:45
9.	"Hurts My Heart"	Zito	4:15
10.	"Sweet Jelly Donut"	Neville	5:44
11.	"All Around the World"	Zito	3:13
12.	"Brotherhood"	Allman, Neville, Zito, Wooton, Yonrico Scott	3:52

== Personnel ==
Royal Southern Brotherhood

- Cyril Neville – vocals, percussion
- Devon Allman – vocals, guitar
- Mike Zito – vocals, guitar
- Charlie Wooton – bass guitar
- Yonrico Scott – drums

Production

- Jim Gaines – producer
- Ruben M. Williams – associate producer
- David Farrell – engineer
- Brad Blackwood – mastering
- Thomas Ruf – executive producer
