= 429 Records =

US record label

- Parent company: Concord Music Group
- Founded: 1950
- Defunct: 2017
- Status: Defunct
- Genre: Alternative rock, adult album alternative
- Country of origin: U.S.

429 Records was an American record label. It was a subsidiary label of Savoy Label Group/Nippon Columbia focusing on indie rock and adult album alternative performers. In addition to releasing new material from musicians such as Dr. John, Little Feat, Cracker, and Gin Blossoms, the label released several compilation albums, including Endless Highway: The Music of The Band and A Song for My Father, a set of recordings of songs by sons and daughters of the original artists.

Savoy was bought by the Concord Music Group in 2017.

== Roster ==
- Joan Armatrading
- Eef Barzelay
- Blues Traveler
- The Bodeans
- Camper Van Beethoven
- Paul Carrack
- Toni Childs
- Circa Zero
- The Constellations
- Cracker
- Marshall Crenshaw
- Dr. John
- Echo & the Bunnymen
- Everclear
- The Features
- Roberta Flack
- Mick Fleetwood
- Steve Forbert
- Gin Blossoms
- Macy Gray
- Jackie Greene
- Bruce Hornsby & The Noisemakers
- Angelique Kidjo
- Sonya Kitchell
- Little Feat
- LL Cool J
- Los Lobos
- Lisa Loeb
- David Lowery
- Edwin McCain
- Meat Loaf
- New York Dolls
- Steve Nieve
- John Popper
- The Proclaimers
- The Rides
- Tim Robbins
- Robbie Robertson
- The Roches
- Paul Rodgers
- Boz Scaggs
- Skybombers
- Smash Mouth
- Clem Snide
- Soul Asylum
- Ronnie Spector
- The Subdudes
- Tonic
- The Warren Brothers
