= Devon Allman =

American rock musician (born 1972)

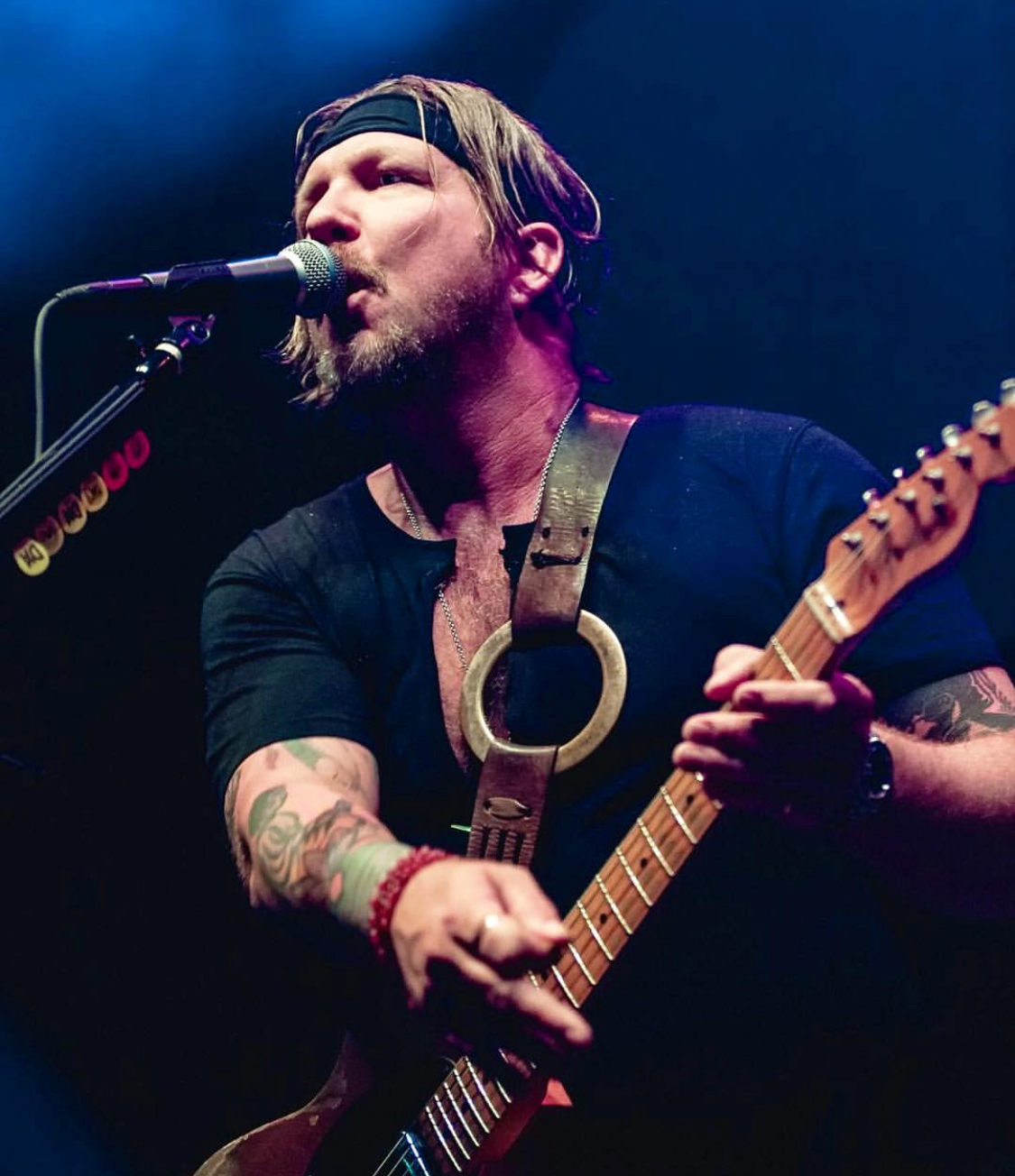
- Allman performing at Brooklyn Bowl in Las Vegas in 2018

Background information
- Born: Devon Lane Allman; August 10, 1972 (age 54); Corpus Christi, Texas, U.S.
- Origin: St. Louis, Missouri, U.S.
- Genres: Blues rock, rock
- Occupations: Musician; songwriter; producer
- Instruments: Vocals, guitar, keyboards
- Years active: 1999–present
- Label: Ruf
- Member of: Devon Allman Project, The Allman Betts Band
- Formerly of: Honeytribe, Royal Southern Brotherhood
- Website: devonallmanproject.com

Devon Lane Allman (born August 10, 1972) is an American guitarist, vocalist, songwriter, and record producer. He is the son of musician and singer-songwriter Gregg Allman and has appeared occasionally as a guest musician for Gregg Allman and The Allman Brothers Band. Allman is the founder and bandleader of Honeytribe, also known as Devon Allman's Honeytribe, with whom he released two albums and toured across North America and Europe. Prior to Honeytribe, Allman contributed to several other musical recordings, notably Vargas Blues Band and the A Song for My Father compilation album. He was one of the original members of Royal Southern Brotherhood and contributed to their first two studio albums and toured with them. In 2013, Allman launched his solo career as the Devon Allman Band, and has since released three albums. His latest tour, branded as the Devon Allman Project, features special guest Duane Betts.

== Early years ==
Allman is the son of Gregory Lenoir "Gregg" Allman (of The Allman Brothers Band) and Shelley Kay Winters. His parents divorced when he was an infant, and he grew up in Corpus Christi, Texas, in Cleveland, Ohio, in Tennessee, and in St. Louis, Missouri, raised by his mother.

Allman began playing music as a teen, but was not influenced by his father. He did not meet his father until he was in his teens, but they then bonded instantly. For several years in the 1990s he performed around the growing St. Louis blues and rock music scene, while also managing a suburban Guitar Center store where he met his future Royal Southern Brotherhood bandmate, Mike Zito.

In his twenties, Allman tried various musical styles and sounds to distance himself from his father's sound and avoid obvious comparisons, though his father did not meddle in Allman's career. In his thirties, Allman embraced the blues and rock genres.

== Career ==
=== The Dark Horses ===
In the early 1990s Devon Allman headed up a band in St. Louis called The Dark Horses.

=== Honeytribe ===
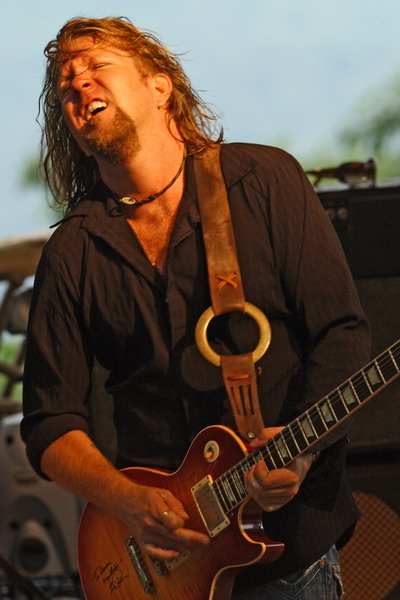
Allman in 2007

Allman formed Honeytribe in 1999. In 2001, the band broke up so Allman could spend time with his newly born son. They re-formed in 2005 with their original lineup, and have since toured in the United States, Europe, and Canada, and have recorded two albums. They recorded Torch in 2006 and played up to 300 shows a year in 42 states and ten countries. Allman eventually grew restless with the original Honeytribe sound and pared the band down to a power trio in 2008 with bassist George Potsos and new drummer Gabriel Strange. This incarnation of Devon Allman's Honeytribe released Space Age Blues in the fall of 2010.

=== Royal Southern Brotherhood ===
In October 2011, Allman began working on a project titled the Royal Southern Brotherhood. The blues-rock supergroup includes Cyril Neville, Mike Zito, Grammy Award winning drummer Yonrico Scott and bassist Charlie Wooton. Allman was skeptical of joining the group at first, telling his manager "Dude are you crazy? Thats like putting five quarterbacks in a room and saying 'go play football'. What the Hell are you talking about?" However he soon changed his mind and the group recorded their first album in December 2011, over five days at Dockside Studio, a 12-acre (4.9 ha) estate on the banks of Vermilion Bayou, in Maurice, Louisiana. The group made its stage debut in September 2011 at the Rock 'n' Bowl in New Orleans. As of September 2012 they have toured extensively in the U.S. and fourteen foreign countries.

=== The Allman Betts Band ===
In November 2018, the sons of Gregg Allman and Dickey Betts announced the formation of the Allman Betts Band. They kicked off 2019 with an album, Down to the River, and a worldwide tour that featured new music, songs from their solo projects, and classic Allman Brothers and Gregg Allman tunes in honor of the 50th Anniversary of the Allman Brothers Band. The album, which was released in the June 2019, was produced by Matt Ross-Spang (Jason Isbell, Margo Price, John Prine and Elvis Presley, no relation to the musician of the same name). On August 28, 2020, they released their second album, Bless Your Heart.

=== Solo ===
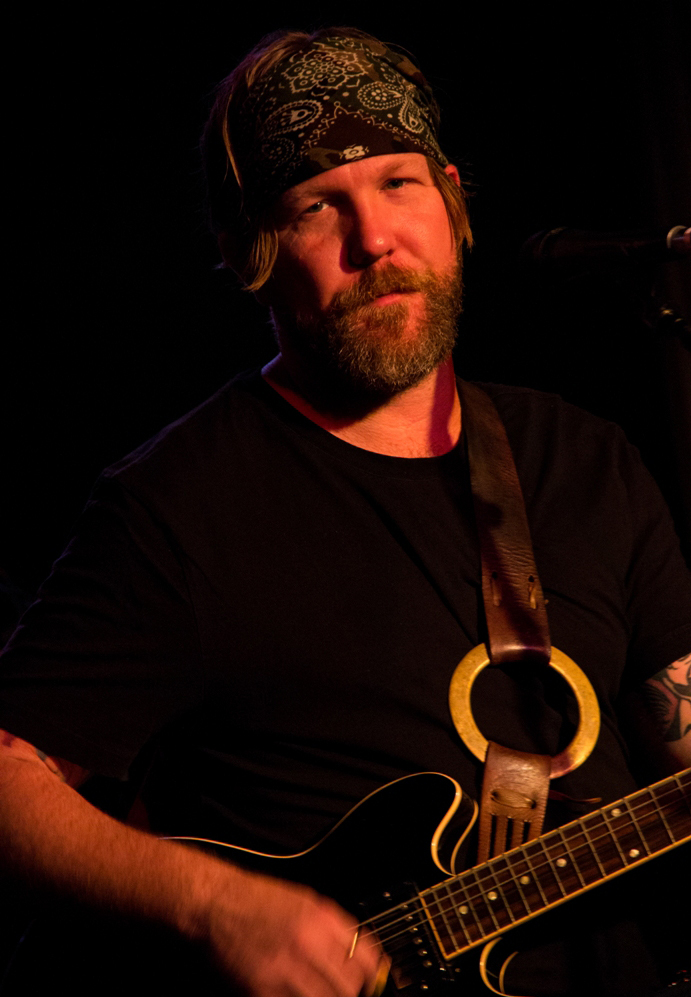
Allman in 2015

In September 2012, Allman finished recording sessions for his first solo album, titled Turquoise, which features Myles Weeks on bass and Yonrico Scott on drums. The sessions were recorded at Ardent Studios, in Memphis, Tennessee, engineered by Pete Matthews and produced by Jim Gaines, and includes guest musicians Luther Dickinson, Samantha Fish, Rick Steff and Ron Holloway. A solo tour began in November 2012, and the touring band include Pedro Arevalo on bass, Bobby Schneck Jr. on second guitar, and Anthony Nanney on drums. The album was released on February 12, 2013.

=== Other contributions ===
In 2005, Allman appeared on Love, Union, Peace with bluesman Javier Vargas' Vargas Blues Band (along with Jack Bruce, Reese Wynans, and others), and in 2008 on the Flamenco Blues Experience recording by the same outfit. In 2007, Allman guested on Paris Luna's City Lights album. He has also made appearances at various festivals and on MTV Europe.

== Influences ==
Allman grew up on classic, blues-inspired rock music, and has specifically mentioned Santana, The Rolling Stones, The Doors, and The Allman Brothers Band as influences, as well as heavy metal acts such as Iron Maiden, Metallica, Megadeth and Testament.

When asked if there was one record that he could cite as the definitive recording that has influenced and inspired him, Allman responded with Layla, by Derek and The Dominos. He explained, "Although it's not straight blues, it's obviously dripping with soulful blues guitar. Layla has always appealed to me because you can really really 'feel' what Clapton was going through. That man was straight up in love. It brought out a burning passion in his throat and fingers that is undeniable, and it obviously soaked into the other players on the record. My uncle Duane just sounds like a bird on it as well! It has so much raw energy and passion that it sounds ultra fresh every time I put it on. Front to back, one of the few records that can bring me to tears if I let it."

== Discography ==
=== Solo ===
- Turquoise (2013)
- Ragged & Dirty (Ruf Records, 2014)
- Ride or Die (2016)
- Miami Moon (2024)
- Blues Summit (2025)

=== Ocean Six ===
- Somewhere Between Day and Night (2003): Guitar and vocals

=== Honeytribe ===
- Torch (2006)
- Space Age Blues (2010)

=== Royal Southern Brotherhood ===
- Royal Southern Brotherhood (2012)
- Songs from the Road (Live in Germany) (2013)
- Heartsoulblood (2014)

=== Allman Betts Band ===
- Down to the River (2019)
- Bless Your Heart (2020)

=== Other contributions ===
- Vargas Blues Band – Love, Union, Peace (2005): Vocals on "Dance Away The Blues", "How Verso Are You?", and "Magic of the Gods"
- Vargas Blues Band – Lost & Found (2007): Vocals on "One Way Out", "Statesboro Blues" and "Layla"
- Various artists – A Song for My Father (2007): "Midnight Rider"
- Vargas Blues Band – Flamenco Blues Experience (2008): Vocals on "Blues In My Soul"
- Vargas Blues Band – Comes Alive With Friends (2009): Guitar and vocals on "One Way Out", "How Verso Are You?", and "Down by the River"; vocals on "Blues In My Soul"
- Dan Bruder Band – Act of Kindness (2010)
- Jeremiah Johnson – Production work on Grind (2015)

== Musical equipment ==
Allman's primary guitar is a Gibson Les Paul, which he calls "Number One". It is an exact, custom-shop replication of a '59. It was signed by Les Paul when they played together at the Iridium Jazz Club in New York City in 2007.

Allman currently uses Fuchs Overdrive Supreme amplifiers.

== Miscellaneous projects ==
Allman appeared in the rock comedy series called Who the Hell is Dan Bruder which launched online June 2010. It is the story of a slightly delusional, middle-aged wannabe rocker who can not let go of the dream of stardom.

In 2011, Allman began marketing his "Devon Allman's Chipotle Blues" branded hot sauce via Born to Hula.
