= Ragged & Dirty (album) =

Studio album by Devon Allman
- Released: October 14, 2014
- Recorded: 2014
- Studio: Joyride, Chicago, Illinois
- Genre: Blues rock
- Length: 47:55
- Label: Ruf Records
- Producer: Tom Hambridge

Devon Allman chronology
Turquoise (2013)	Ragged & Dirty (2014)	Ride or Die (2016)

Ragged & Dirty is the second solo album by Devon Allman, released in October, 2014. The core lineup consisted of Felton Crews (bass), Giles Cory (guitar), Tom Hambridge (drums) and Marty Sammon (keyboards). Additional artists included Bobby Schneck Jr. (guitar & background vocals) and Wendy Moten (background vocals).

== Recording, production ==
Ragged & Dirty was recorded at Joyride Studios in Chicago and mixed & mastered at the Switchyard Studios in Nashville. It was produced, mixed and mastered by Tom Hambridge.

== Track listing ==
No.	Title	Writer(s)	Length
1.	"Half the Truth"	Tom Hambridge, Richard Fleming	3:08
2.	"Can't Lose 'Em All"	Hambridge, Lee Roy Parnell	3:46
3.	"Leavin'"	Hambridge, Fleming	2:42
4.	"I'll Be Around" (cover: The Spinners)	Thomas Randolph Bell, Phil Hurtt	3:56
5.	"Traveling"	Devon Allman	4:17
6.	"Midnight Lake Michigan"	Allman	9:31
7.	"Ten Million Slaves" (cover: Otis Taylor)	Otis Mark Taylor	3:23
8.	"Blackjack Heartattack"	Allman	3:12
9.	"Back to You"	Allman	5:04
10.	"Times Have Changed"	Hambridge, Fleming	3:29
11.	"Ragged & Dirty" (cover: Luther Allison)	Luther Allison, Ray Goodman, Robert Andrew Kreinar, Joseph P Peraino, Andrew Smith	2:45
12.	"Leave the City"	Allman	3:00

== Personnel ==
- Devon Allman - guitars, vocals
- Felton Crews - bass
- Giles Cory - guitar
- Tom Hambridge - drums, background vocals, tambourine, xylophone (track 12)
- Marty Sammon - B3 organ, piano, wurlitzer (track 4)

Additional artists

- Bobby Schneck Jr. - lead guitar (track 3), background vocals (tracks 7 & 10)
- Wendy Moten - background vocals (tracks 4 & 9)

== Charts ==
Ragged & Dirty debuted and peaked at #4 on Billboard's Blues Albums the week of November 1, 2014.
