= Jimmy Carpenter =

- Born: James Carpenter; Greensboro, North Carolina, United States
- Genres: Electric blues
- Occupations: Saxophonist, singer, songwriter, arranger and record producer
- Instruments: Vocals, saxophone
- Years active: 1970s–present
- Label: Various
- Website: Official website

James Carpenter is an American electric blues saxophonist, singer, songwriter, arranger and record producer, who won a Blues Music Award in both 2021 and 2022 in the 'Instrumentalist - Horn' category. He has been involved in the music industry over a span of six decades and, since 2008, has released five solo albums. His most recent was The Louisiana Record, issued in 2022 by Gulf Coast Records. His recording credits include work for Billy Iuso, Jimmy Thackery, Tab Benoit, Walter "Wolfman" Washington, Eric Lindell, Maria Muldaur, Honey Island Swamp Band, and Mike Zito, among others.

== Life and career ==
He was born in Greensboro, North Carolina, United States. His father's record collection included big band music, and also Dave Brubeck records which had Paul Desmond playing the alto saxophone. It was his first musical inspiration and Carpenter decided at an early age, that he wanted to play the saxophone. The education system in Greensboro at that time, allowed budding musicians get access to quality music programs, with Carpenter playing in the school band from fifth grade. He was helped by having what he described as "a great saxophone teacher, Charles Murth, who was a wonderful band director". By high school, Carpenter briefly decided to switch to playing the guitar, but quickly realised his future lay with the saxophone. When it came to leaving school and deciding on the next career step, Carpenter choose to try to get work playing gigs. Naturally gravitating towards the hippie culture then found on Tate Street, Carpenter expanded his musical knowledge hearing recorded work by Otis Redding and Little Walter. By 1979, Carpenter started to play in the Little Alfred Band, a group of local hopefuls. He followed his time there by joining the Alka-Phonics, described on Carpenter's website as "a renegade blues band". The band was formed following potential members all being present in the audience at a Tinsley Ellis concert. The Alka-Phonics went on tour in the Eastern United States, playing a mixture of James Brown, Motown and R&B standards. Whilst the group recorded several demos, nothing tangible came out of it and the band split up in 1987 after eight years of playing and touring.

Carpenter then joined a blues rock band based in Charlottesville, Virginia, named the Believers, which turned in to another eight year working period. The band make several recordings, one of which was produced by Garry Tallent. By 1996, with grunge all pervasive, the band found work harder to find and Carpenter left them to open a booking agency. He built the business up over an 18 month period, before he was contacted by his friend, Tinsley Ellis. He tempted Carpenter in to giving up the business and touring for a year as the saxophonist in a four piece band. As that period elapsed, Carpenter heard from another guitarist, Jimmy Thackery, who enquired if Carpenter was available to do a few shows together. This turned out to be a job that lasted for six years, as Carpenter became a full-time member of Thackray's backing band, the Drivers. That band made recordings and toured across Europe with Carpenter picking up the role of road manager, learning new skills as well as obtaining more valuable playing experience.

In 2003, Carpenter left the ensemble to settle in his new home in New Orleans and build up local working opportunities. During this time Carpenter made acquaintances with Walter "Wolfman" Washington who, following a joint show in Maryland, suggested that Carpenter join his band. This arrangement lasted for another ten years. Later, Carpenter started working alongside Eric Lindell, and undertook horn arrangements on several Honey Island Swamp Band recordings, as well as playing in the band of Billy Iuso. Carpenter also got unofficially involved in the day to day running of the New Orleans Jazz & Heritage Festival.

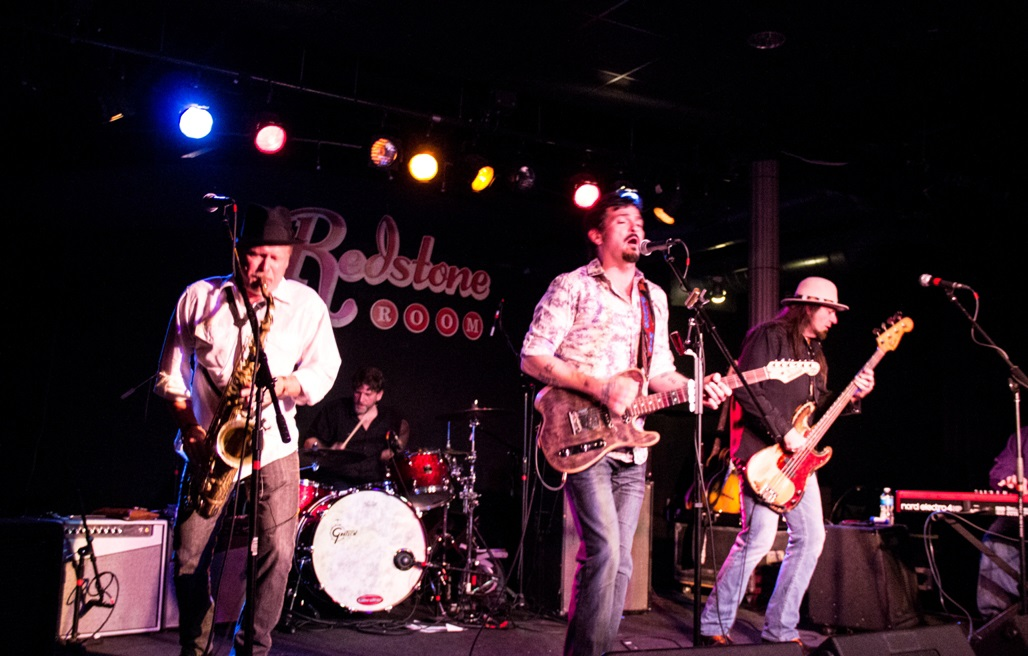
Mike Zito and The Wheel at the Redstone Room, Davenport, Indiana, May 2015 (Carpenter on the left)

In 2008, after years of working as a sideman or session musician, Carpenter recorded his debut solo album. Toiling In Obscurity. This came about as a by-product of the effects of Hurricane Katrina, as it effectively provided funds via the Small Business Administration to finance the recording. Carpenter wrote, or co-wrote, half of the tracks on the 10 song strong collection. After the recording was completed, Carpenter went to work with Mike Zito, whom he had met at Buddy Guy's Legends when Zito had been the opening act for Thackery. Eventually Zito put together a full-time backing band called the Wheel, which included Carpenter playing saxophone, plus Scot Sutherland (bass), Lewis Stephens (keyboards), and Rob Lee (percussion). The band issued a number of albums and toured extensively over the next few years. In 2013, Mike Zito and the Wheel were booked on the Sin City Soul & Blues Revival, in Las Vegas. Carpenter, as before, got involved in the back stage organisation and he was approached by AJ Gross, a festival organiser, who asked if Carpenter would be interested in helping with another festival planned for the next year. Gross became the founder of the Big Blues Bender, a three day music festival. At the 2014 festival, Carpenter found the lady, Carrie Stowers, whom he has spent the rest of his life with, in the merchandise booth. Carpenter's next album, Walk Away, was released the same year and used similar personnel as his previous release. In 2016, Carpenter relocated to reside in Las Vegas.

In 2017, Carpenter issued Plays The Blues on the Vizztone label. His recording ensemble included both Ellis and Zito on guitar. By this time Carpenter had been appointed as the musical director for the Big Blues Bender, and as leader of the Bender Brass, which is the Bender’s house band. He is also president of the Las Vegas Blues Society. On September 20, 2019, Gulf Coast Records released Carpenter's next album, Soul Doctor. The album included guest appearances by Red Young (keyboards), plus the guitarist Nick Schnebelen on the track "Soul Doctor", with Zito playing slide guitar work on the track "Wild Streak". The album had a total of 10 tracks, of which Carpenter wrote, or co-wrote, seven. The lack of opportunity to promote the album, because of the limitations imposed by the COVID-19 pandemic in the United States, was partly offset by Carpenter being awarded his first Blues Music Award in 2021, after five previous unsuccessful nominations. The same year he received a "Participation Grammy" (not the statue, but a certificate recognizing contributions) for composing a piece of music that was recorded by the New Orleans Nightcrawlers. The piece, entitled "Tomb Tune", was on their 2020 album, Atmosphere. The album won the 2020 Grammy Award for Best Regional Roots Music Album.

In 2021, Carpenter was given a Blues Music Award for the second consecutive year in the 'Instrumentalist - Horn' category. His next album, The Louisiana Record, was released on September 16, 2022, via Gulf Coast Records. The album contained Carpenter's reworkings of his favorite songs from New Orleans and Louisiana, and was recorded at the Dockside Studios in Maurice, Louisiana. Carpenter noted at first he was uncertain about the idea stating "With such a huge premium placed on original material, I wasn't sure a cover album would work. But when he (Vito) said we would go to Dockside... and record with my old friends from New Orleans, I was sold".

In November and December 2022, Carpenter played dates in both the UK and US. For part of that tour, Carpenter enlisted the late Sherman Robertson's UK band, Blues Move.

In June 2026 he toured the UK and Europe including imitate venues such as the Bromley Blues Club (Bromley Little Theatre) in South London, La Belle Angele in Edinburgh and the Old Brewery Store in Faversham, Kent.

== Discography ==
=== Albums ===
Year	Title	Record label
2008	Toiling in Obscurity	Self-released
2014	Walk Away	Onsax / Vizztone Records
2017	Plays the Blues	Vizztone Records
2019	Soul Doctor	Gulf Coast Records / Select-O-Hits
2022	The Louisiana Record	Gulf Coast Records
2024	Just Got Started	Gulf Coast Records

== See also ==
- List of electric blues musicians
