= Lauren Anderson (musician) =

American blues and soul singer-songwriter

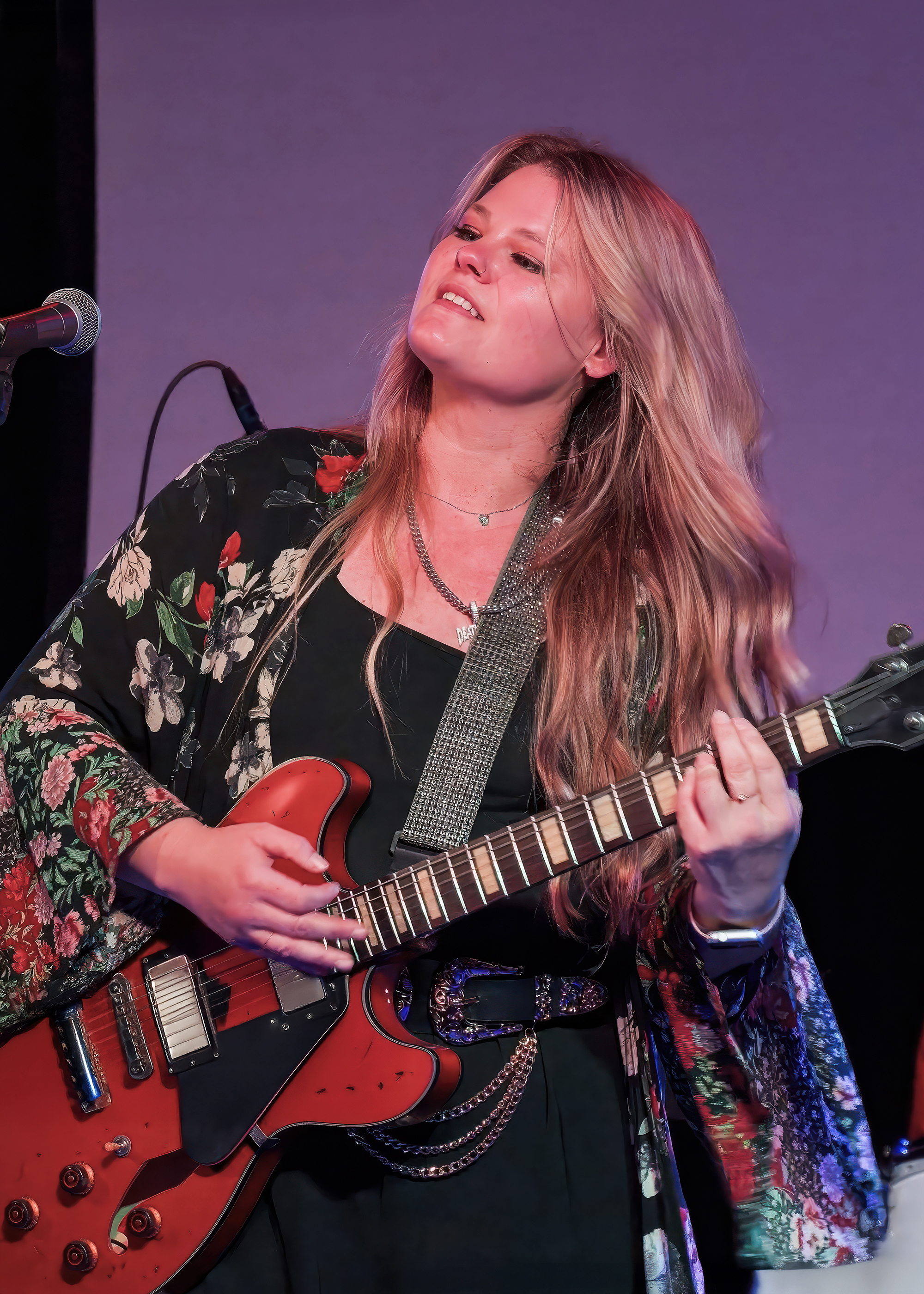
- Anderson performing at 3rd and Lindsley, Nashville, TN, 2025

Background information
- Born: Chicago, Illinois, U.S.
- Origin: Nashville, Tennessee, U.S.
- Genres: Blues rock; soul; Blues; Americana
- Occupations: Singer-songwriter; guitarist; music therapist
- Instruments: Vocals; guitar; piano
- Years active: 2014–present
- Label: Independent
- Website: www.laurenandersonmusic.com

Lauren Anderson is an American singer-songwriter and guitarist from Chicago, Illinois. While often cited as a blues artist, Anderson's work draws from multiple genres, including soul, rock, country, and Americana. Her albums have charted on the Billboard Blues Albums chart, and she has received multiple Josie Music Awards, including Best Jazz/Blues Vocalist of the Year in 2025. In 2025, she competed on Season 28 of NBC's The Voice as a member of Snoop Dogg's team.

== Early life and education ==
Born in Chicago, Anderson grew up in nearby Oak Park, Illinois, in a musical and artistic household. Her father is an architect and her mother is an interior designer. Her two younger brothers, Mark and Erik, are both musicians who studied music in college. She began classical piano lessons at age eight and sang in multiple school and community choirs. She graduated from Oak Park and River Forest High School in 2003. Initially hearing recordings of Susan Tedeschi and Bonnie Raitt, she later absorbed influences from Etta James, Eva Cassidy, Nina Simone, Joss Stone, Beyoncé, Christina Aguilera, Kelly Clarkson, Jason Mraz, and the Black Eyed Peas.

== Career ==
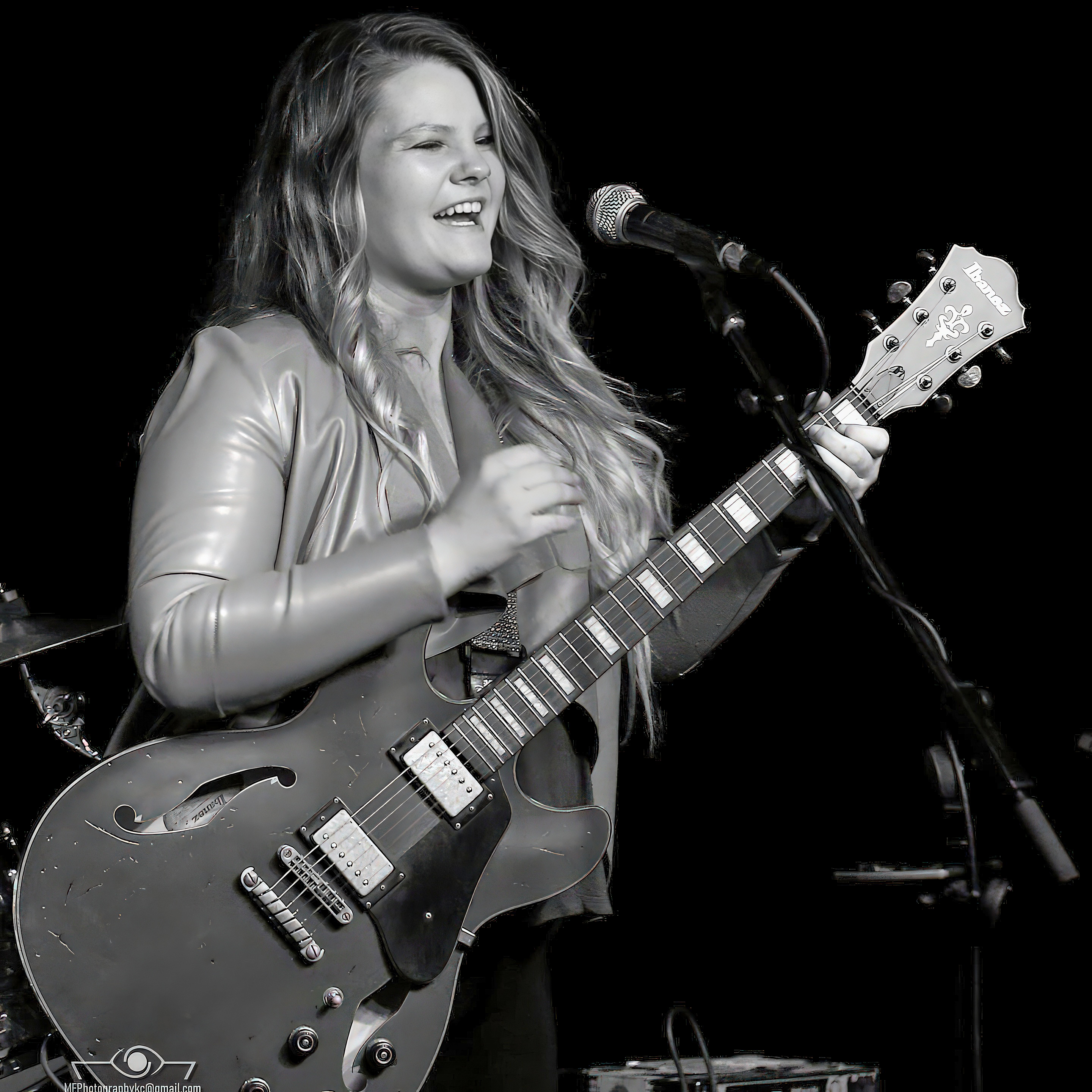
Anderson performing at Knuckleheads Saloon in Kansas City, MO, 2019

Anderson formed a band in 2014 and released her debut EP, Do & Hope — named after her mother's family motto — later that year. Her first full-length album, Truly Me, followed in 2015, and she was named Female Vocalist of the Year by the Midwest Music Awards that same year. In 2017, she relocated to Nashville, Tennessee, to pursue music full-time, where she established a monthly residency at the Bourbon Street Blues and Boogie Bar. Anderson has shared stages with artists including Beth Hart, Ana Popovic, Samantha Fish, and Charlie Berry.

In 2018, Anderson won first place in the Wang Dang Doodle Competition, hosted by the Nashville Blues and Roots Alliance. This won her a showcase at B.B. King's Blues Club in Memphis, Tennessee, during the IBC's. Her EP release The Game subsequently spent five consecutive weeks in the top 50 of the Billboard Blues Albums chart. She also released the five-track EP Won't Stay Down on July 26, 2019, inspired by various music industry challenges.

Anderson's second full-length album, Love on the Rocks, was released on August 6, 2021, and debuted at number 14 on the Billboard Blues Albums chart, number 4 on the Roots Music Report, and number 21 on the NACC Blues Chart. The album was produced by the Lauren Anderson Band with engineering by Taylor Lonardo, and featured guest guitarist Mike Zito. The title track has exceeded 1.4 million streams on Spotify.

Her third full-length album, Burn It All Down, was released in 2022 and reached number 12 on the Billboard Blues Albums chart. The 12-track, 42-minute album featured guest appearances from guitarist Albert Castiglia on "Zombie Blues" and Nashville guitarist John Salaway, who co-wrote "Hit the Spot." Session musicians Jon and Liz Estes contributed saxophone and flute. Americana Highways wrote that Anderson possesses "what many blues singers today lack – that genuine gusto & soul that Janis had," comparing her to Janis Joplin. Her work has received coverage in publications including Glide Magazine, Goldmine, Blues Magazine, and Making A Scene.

In 2023, Anderson established a home studio in Nashville where she hosts songwriting sessions and runs a program inviting visitors to write and record original songs. She also conducts songwriting sessions with veterans via Zoom. In 2024, she recorded the collaborative single "Ain't No Cure Like the Blues" with Justine Blazer at the historic Muscle Shoals Sound Studio in Alabama.

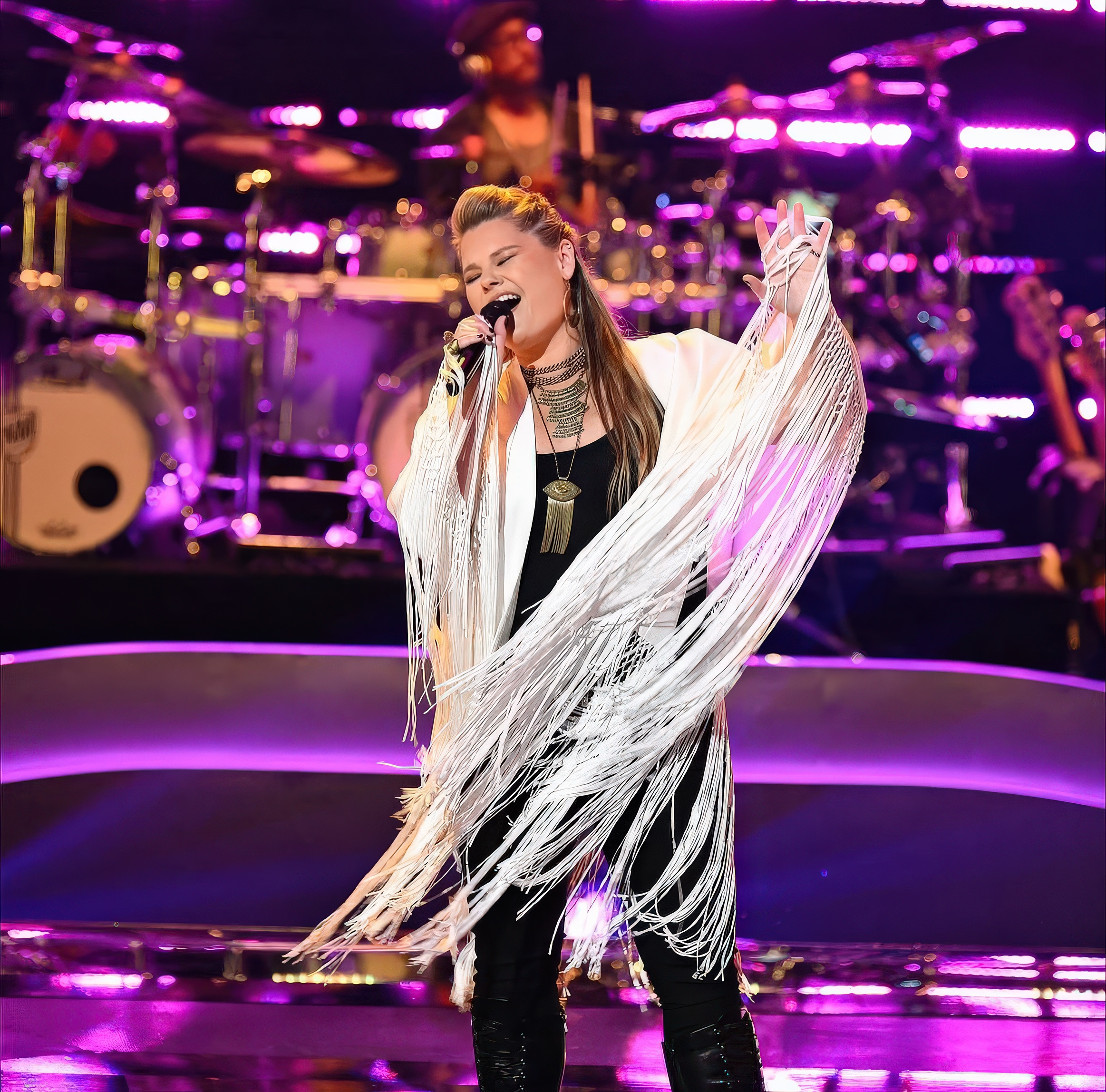
Anderson performing on The Voice, Universal Studios, California, November 2025

In 2018, Anderson had prepared for a month to audition for The Voice, with family flying out to support her, but production filled all team slots before she could perform. Seven years later, in 2025, she successfully auditioned for Season 28. During her blind audition, she performed Chris Stapleton's "Midnight Train to Memphis." Coach Snoop Dogg turned his chair at the last moment, later saying he had deliberately waited so he would not have to compete with other coaches for Anderson, and told her, "You're the missing piece of my puzzle, Lauren". Anderson's parents were present for her blind audition, and she was immediately introduced to Snoop Dogg's Death Row Records team, including label president Sarah Ramaker. In the Battle Rounds, Anderson was paired against Makenzie Phipps, and the duo performed Carrie Underwood's "Before He Cheats." Snoop Dogg selected Anderson as the winner. In the Knockout Rounds, she performed P!nk's "Try."

In February 2026, Anderson released the collaborative single "3rd Degree" with fellow blues artist Kara Frazier.

== Discography ==
=== Studio albums ===
Title	Year	Artist	Label	Producer
Do & Hope (EP)	2014	Lauren Anderson	Independent	Lauren Anderson
Truly Me	2015	Lauren Anderson	Independent	Lauren Anderson
The Game (EP)	2018	Lauren Anderson	Independent	Lauren Anderson
Won't Stay Down (EP)	2019	Lauren Anderson	Independent	Taylor Kropp
Love on the Rocks	2021	Lauren Anderson	CPI/Independent	Lauren Anderson Band; engineered by Taylor Lonardo
Burn It All Down	2022	Lauren Anderson	Independent	Lauren Anderson Band & Taylor Lonardo

=== Singles ===
Title	Year	Artist	Notes
"What Good Is a Bad Boy?"	2016	Lauren Anderson	Produced by Sean Michel Kelly (Sixpence None the Richer); recorded at Ocean Way Nashville
"Box Wine Blues"	2016	Lauren Anderson	Produced by Sean Michel Kelly; recorded at Ocean Way Nashville
"Mr. Christmas"	2018	Lauren Anderson	Produced by Taylor Kropp
"Creep"	2019	Lauren Anderson	Cover of "Creep" by Radiohead; recorded at Taylor Lonardo's studio in Nashville
"I Wanna Dance with Somebody"	2020	Lauren Anderson	Cover of "I Wanna Dance with Somebody" by Whitney Houston; recorded at Taylor Lonardo's studio in Nashville
"Back to Chicago" (feat. Mike Zito)	2021	Lauren Anderson	From Love on the Rocks
"Zombie Blues" (feat. Albert Castiglia)	2022	Lauren Anderson	From Burn It All Down
"Bad New Ways"	2023	Lauren Anderson	Self-produced
"Love Again"	2023	Lauren Anderson	Self-produced; recorded with Blue House Band; 2024 Josie Music Award winner
"Go Find Less" (feat. Kathryn Rose Wood)	2024	Lauren Anderson	Produced by Zakk Garner
"Ain't No Cure Like the Blues"	2024	Lauren Anderson / Justine Blazer	Produced by Lauren Anderson & Justine Blazer; recorded at Muscle Shoals Sound Studio
"Boom, Boom, Boom"	2024	Lauren Anderson	Produced by Evan Coffman at Demolition Music
"Seasons Change"	2025	Lauren Anderson / Tracee Perrin	Produced by Lauren Anderson & Tracee Perrin; recorded with Blue House Band
"'Neath the Mistletoe"	2025	Lauren Anderson	Produced by Zakk Garner
"3rd Degree"	2026	Lauren Anderson / Kara Frazier	Produced by Zakk Garner
"Got It All"	2026	Lauren Anderson	Produced by Zakk Garner

=== Charts ===
- The Game
  - Top Blues Albums: Top 50 (5 consecutive weeks, 2018)
- Love on the Rocks
  - Top Blues Albums at No. 14 (2021)
  - Roots Music Report at No. 4 (2021)
  - NACC Blues Chart at No. 21 (2021)
- Burn It All Down
  - Top Blues Albums at No. 12 (2022)

== Awards ==
=== Josie Music Awards ===
Year	Category	Nominated work	Result	Ref.
2024	Winner	"Love Again"	Won	
2025	Best Jazz/Blues Vocalist of the Year		Won	

=== Other awards ===
Year	Award	Result	Ref.
2015	Midwest Music Awards – Female Vocalist of the Year	Won	
2018	Wang Dang Doodle Competition	Won	
