= Paris Luna =

American band

Heart Like Mine

Paris Luna is a band based in Carrollton, Georgia formed in 2004. They play a blend of rock, country and Americana music. Members include Heather Russell, songwriter, acoustic guitar, piano, vocals, Michael Harris on lead guitar, Toby Marriott on bass and Kane Russell on drums (Barry Waldrep Band and Zac Brown Band). "Paris Luna" is Russell's stage name.

On September 3, 2011, Paris Luna played in Turner Field at the Atlanta Braves summer concert series. They won the 2012 GA Music Award for Best Rock Female and, the success continued, as the song Tell Me Why was well received in the Atlanta radio market.

Paris Luna has performed with several notable acts. The list includes, but not limited to the following:

- Sheryl Crow and Uncle Kracker, at Centennial Olympic Park, Atlanta, Georgia
- Kenny Chesney and Tim McGraw KICKS 101.5 pre-concert carty at the Georgia Dome, Atlanta, Georgia
- Darrell Scott, West Fest, Carrollton, Georgia
- Drivin' N' Cryin' at Rock and Ride, Atlanta Georgia
- Rusted Root, Johnson City, Tennessee
- Blind Boys of Alabama, Albany, Georgia
- John Cowan, Red Clay Theatre, Duluth, Georgia
- Lonestar, Centennial Olympic Park, Atlanta, Georgia for KICKS 101.5, a Cumulus Media station
- Phillip Phillips, Centennial Olympic Park, Atlanta, Georgia for KICKS 101.5, a Cumulus Media station
- John Driskell Hopkins of the Zac Brown Band, Tavern 99, Atlanta, Georgia
- SXSW, Austin, Texas 2007, 2009, 2011, 2012
- Music City Roots, Nashville, Tennessee
- Marshall Tucker Band, Pyne Road Park

Paris Luna is an SESAC affiliate and owner of After August Entertainment, LLC.

Paris Luna is also an advocate for children and has played at Children's Hospitals through "500 Songs for Kids" and multiple camps associated with the hospitals. Paris has partnered with Boys & Girls Clubs of Metro Atlanta, as well as other charity organizations to help make a difference for a better tomorrow. In addition, Paris Luna performed the opening concert for WellStar Health System in Paulding County, sponsored by KICKS 101.5, Cumulus Media.

Paris Luna worked with Cumming, GA based women's apparel company Dang Chicks to present Dang Girls Night Out, an evening of performances by some of Atlanta's top female singer/songwriters, representing different stages in life and ranging in age from 15 to 50+. The May 18, 2013 event at the Red Clay Theatre and Arts Center in Duluth, featured performances by "Mama" Jan Smith, Mandy Gawley, Emily Lynch, Paris Luna, Krysta Nick, and Caitlin Gutierrez. CNN Correspondent Holly Firfer was the emcee. Proceeds from the night benefited SERV International, a Canton-GA based, non-profit organization. SERV used funds from the event to provide food for some 30 girls at Pasitos de Jesus, an orphanage based in the Dominican Republic. SERV also provided food for the girls to distribute to widows and single moms and their children in surrounding villages.

Paris Luna's debut album, City Lights, was recorded in 2007 at Quad Studios Nashville and Ocean Way Nashville recording studios, in Nashville, Tennessee. It received airtime on Adult Alternative, Hot Adult Contemporary and Americana radio stations. In addition, it was played on popular television networks such as Lifetime, Showtime, MTV, VH1 and Discovery Channel and was heard in series such as Bad Girls Club, Road Rules and American Psychic Challenge.

City Lights Track Titles:

- All For Nothin
- Lately
- Tell Me Why
- Someday
- No Good For Me
- Having a Hard Time
- Sick Of Yourself
- So Unlike Me
- Kane's Song
- January Still
- Rescue Me

All tracks written By Heather Russell/Paris Luna/After August Entertainment, LLC/ SESAC. Special guest, Devon Allman, performs on No Good For Me and Sick of Yourself.

Paris Luna's sophomore project, Between The Ditches, produced by Trent Rhodes and recorded at Blackbird Studios in Nashville, Tennessee, was released in 2013. If You're Not There With Me was written by Barry Waldrep and published by After August Entertainment, LLC and Delta Grass Productions.

Between the Ditches Track Titles:

- Boots and Bangles
- Southern Girl
- My America
- If You're Not There With Me

All tracks written By Heather Russell/Paris Luna/After August Entertainment, LLC/ SESAC, except, If You're Not There With Me, written by Barry Waldrep/ After August Entertainment, LLC and Delta Grass Productions.

The hit single, Heart Like Mine was released in 2014. Written by Heather Russell/AfterAugust Entertainment/ Paris Luna/ SESAC. It was recorded at Southern Tracks Studio in Atlanta, Ga., and produced by Benji Shanks and Heather Russell/Paris Luna. Heart Like Mine also began Paris Luna's relationship with sponsor Vixen Vodka.

Back Home for the Holidays, recorded with James Taylor Jr. and Wes Ables, used in a national campaign, was played in all Eddie Bauer Stores. Paris Luna was also on the XO Publicity compilation CD number III.

In 2014, Paris Luna joined Barry Waldrep, on his Singular Records project Smoke from the Kitchen. She sang vocals for tracks Dig a Hole (Darlin Cory) and Keep Your Lamp Trimmed and Burning. Recorded at Doppler Studios.

The high-profile lineup on Smoke from the Kitchen includes:

- Banjo: Barry Waldrep (The Barry Waldrep Band)
- Bass: Oteil Burbridge (Allman Brothers Band)
- Drums: Paul Riddle (The Marshall Tucker Band)
- Hammond: Coy Bowles (The Zac Brown Band)
- Guitar: Charlie Starr (Blackberry Smoke)
- Guitar: Benji Shanks (Captain Soularcat/Last Waltz Ensemble)
- Mandolin: David Grisman (Jerry Garcia, Peter Rowan)
- Keyboards: Chuck Leavell (Allman Brothers Band and Rolling Stones)

On May 23, 2014, Paris Luna recorded their live Album Brasstown Ball at the Famous Southern Tracks Studio in Atlanta, Ga., to a live studio audience. Album to be released in 2015.

April 2015 Paris Luna played "Pickin N the Park" with The Kentucky Headhunters, Confederate Railroad and Kurt Thomas benefiting Boys and Girls Club of West Georgia.

June 2015 Paris Luna shared the stage with Lynyrd Skynyrd, Travis Tritt and Blackberry Smoke for "Crock Fest" a collision of Rock and Country at Verizon Wireless Amphitheatre at Encore Park in Alpharetta, Ga, sponsored by Carl Black Chevrolet, Rock 100.5, Kicks 101.5 and Nash Icon 98.9.Cumulus Media.
