= Anders Osborne =

American singer-songwriter (born 1966)

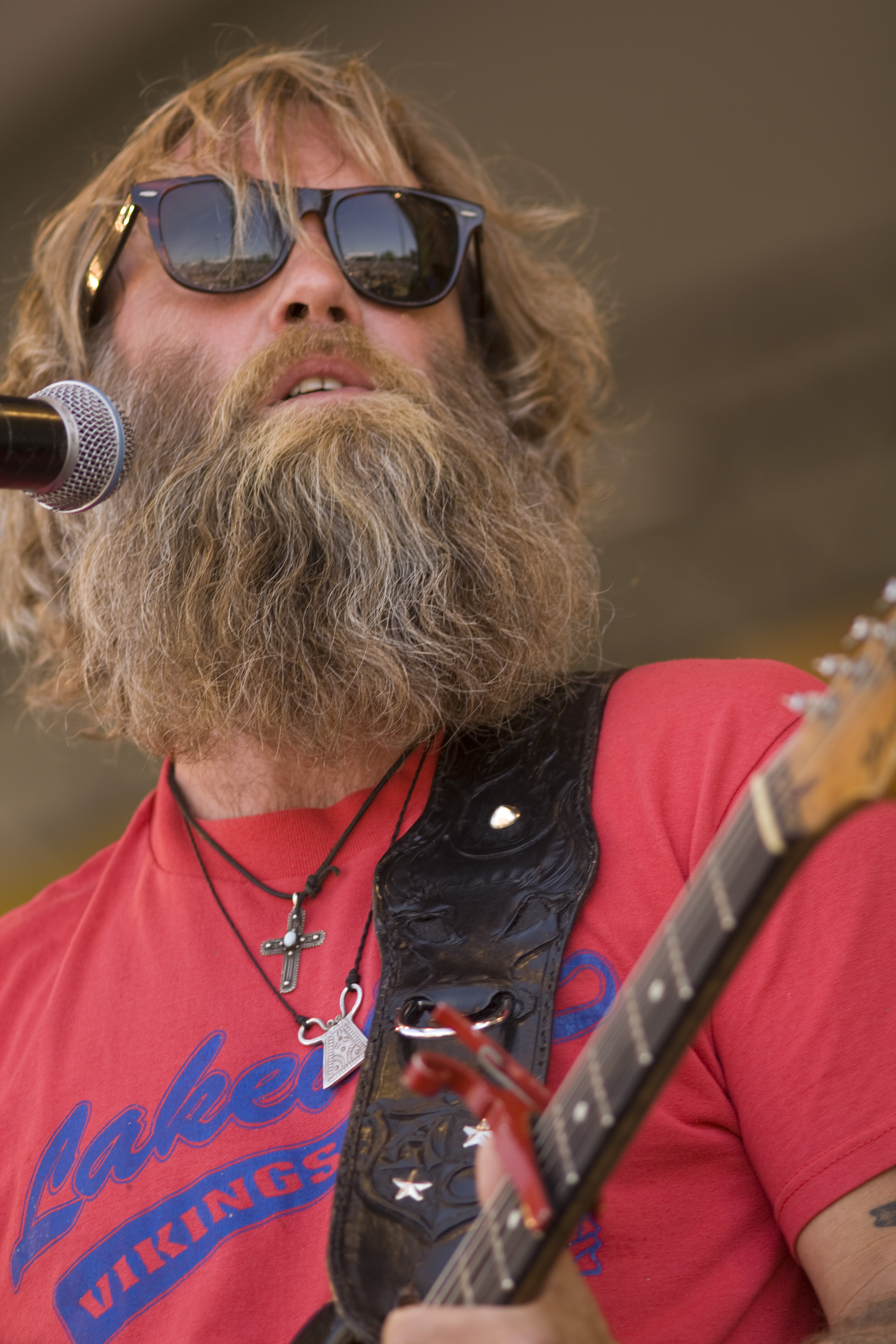
- Anders Osborne at New Orleans Jazz Fest, 2010

Background information
- Born: Anders Osborne; May 4, 1966 (age 60); Uddevalla, Sweden
- Genres: Americana, rock, blues
- Occupations: Guitarist, singer, songwriter
- Instruments: Guitar, vocals
- Years active: 1989–present
- Labels: Alligator Records; Rabadash Records; Okeh Records; Shanachie Records; Back on Dumaine Records
- Website: Andersosborne.com/

Anders Osborne (born May 4, 1966) is an American singer-songwriter. He tours solo and with a band, and often plays in North Mississippi Osborne (N.M.O), a group formed by Osborne and North Mississippi Allstars.

== Early life ==
Anders Osborne was born on May 4, 1966. As a teen, Osborne started playing guitar and listening to Bob Dylan, Neil Young, Jackson Browne, and Joni Mitchell records. He was influenced by the vocal styles of Ray Charles, Van Morrison, Lowell George, Robert Johnson and recordings of African drumming. He considered blues music to be the connection between other musical genres. He began playing in Open D tuning, which he discovered after listening to Joni Mitchell's Blue.

== Okeh records ==
Osborne and his band toured the U.S. during these years and in 1995, he was signed to Okeh Records. He released Which Way to Here, an album that dealt with spirituality and tolerance. The record became Osborne's first commercial break with two top-five singles "Favorite Son" and "Pleasin' You." Both were featured in several Hollywood movies, and the latter was later recorded by Jonny Lang.

== Shanachie Entertainment ==
Shanachie Entertainment signed Osborne in 1998. In 1999, he released his fourth album, Living Room, a personal record that signified some new directions in Osborne's music after the breakup with his longtime accompanist Theresa Andersson, drug use, and a family death. This album also features guest appearances by Keb' Mo', Kirk Joseph and Tommy Malone.

Besides writing for his own album, Osborne has had a number of his songs recorded by other artists. Keb' Mo's 1999 Grammy Award winning album Slow Down featured two songs co-written with Osborne.

After his Shanachie recordings, Osborne worked as a professional songwriter in New Orleans and then in Nashville, first for PolyGram and then its successor Universal Music. His song, "Watch the Wind Blow By," was recorded by the country musician Tim McGraw, hitting No. 1 on the country charts for two weeks and selling over three million albums. He has since co-written with Tab Benoit, Mike Zito and Johnny Sansone, for whom he has also served as producer.

== M.C. Records ==
Returning to New Orleans from Nashville, Osborne recorded Coming Down (2007), a stripped-down semi-acoustic album which was released on the M.C. label and was nominated for the 8th Annual Independent Music Awards Folk/Singer-Songwriter Album of the Year.

== Alligator records ==
In 2009, Osborne recorded a new, full band album co-produced by Osborne, Galactic's Stanton Moore and Pepper Keenan. All songs on the album were written or co-written by Osborne. The album was picked up by Chicago-based Alligator Records, who signed Osborne and released the new recording in 2010 under the title American Patchwork. New Orleans' OffBeat magazine praised the album, saying that he effectively conveyed emotion through his voice and wrote "with remarkable eloquence". Relix described the album as "raging, expressive guitar and soulful singing...from scorched-earth rock to sweet, tender ballads."

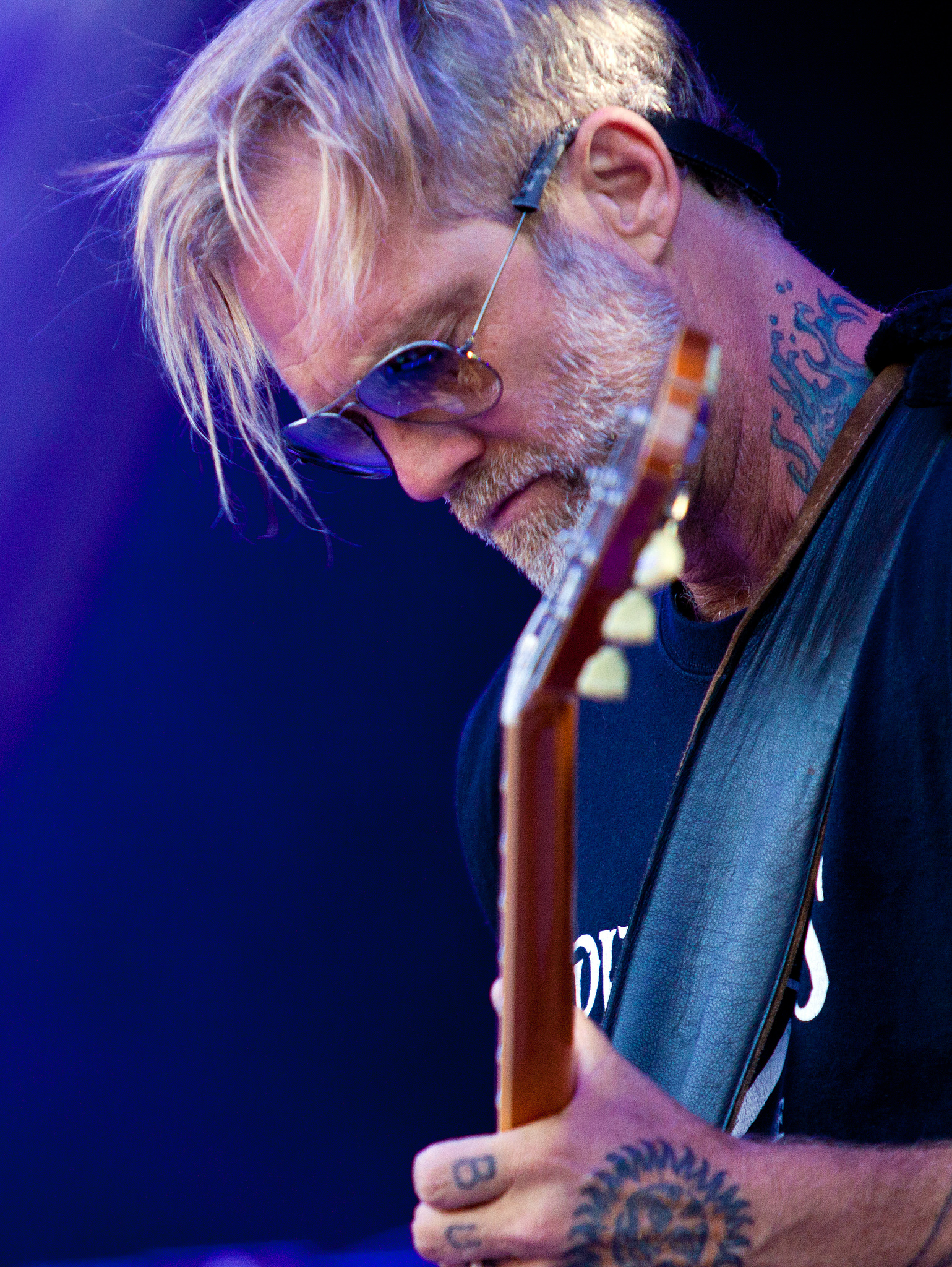
Anders Osborne at the 2016 Telluride Blues and Brews Festival

Since the release of American Patchwork, Osborne has toured frequently, performing with his own band, solo with Keb Mo, with The Stanton Moore Trio, with Toots and the Maytals, alongside Karl Denson's Tiny Universe and with Luther Dickinson as well as with The Voice of the Wetlands All-Stars. He appeared on Galactic's song "Dark Water" from their Ya Ka Ma album, and in 2011 produced and played on critically acclaimed albums by Tab Benoit, Johnny Sansone and Mike Zito. In 2012, he played on and acted as associate producer of Billy Iuso's Naked album.

Osborne released the album Black Eye Galaxy in 2012. Recorded at Dockside Studio in Maurice, Louisiana, the album was produced by Osborne along with engineer Warren Riker and Galactic's Stanton Moore. Its sounds range from heavy electric mayhem to acoustic melodicism. Blurt Magazine praised the album.

In late 2012, Osborne recorded a six-song EP entitled Three Free Amigos, which was released by Alligator early in 2013. The EP, produced by Osborne and Warren Riker, focused more on melodic, acoustic music. Players included Osborne's touring band of bassist Carl Dufresne and drummer Eric Bolivar, plus guitarist Billy Iuso and multi-instrumentalist Johnny Sansone, Osborne himself played guitar, bass, keyboards and drums on various tracks. It was described by Relix as "rugged, soulful singing superb hard-hitting songs...A phenomenal blend of self-awareness, spirit and muscle." His album Peace was released on October 8, 2013.

== Back on Dumaine and 5th Ward records ==
In 2015, Osborne was included in the cast headed by Derek Trucks and Susan Tedeschi of Tedeschi Trucks Band in a memorial concert to honor Joe Cocker Mad Dogs & Englishmen at the Lockn' Festival. In fall of 2014 and March 2015, Osborne recorded album Spacedust & Ocean Views in New Orleans; it was released on March 18, 2016, on his own label, Back on Dumaine Records. His next album, Flower Box, was released on July 22, 2016. Anders' third album on the label, Buddha & the Blues, came out in 2019.

Osborne continues to tour almost constantly, both with his own band and in combination with other artists. He's appeared multiple times at the New Orleans Jazz & Heritage Festival as well as at Bonnaroo Music Festival, The High Sierra Festival, The Telluride Blues & Brews Festival, The Hollowbaloo Music & Arts Festival in Honolulu, the Hangout Festival, WYEP Summer Music Fest, Central Park SummerStage, Miami Valley Music fest, as well as playing with Phil Lesh and others at Terrapin Crossroads.

== Discography ==
=== Albums ===
- 1989: Doin' Fine (Rabadash Records)
- 1993: Break the Chain (Rabadash)
- 1995: Which Way to Here (OKeh/Sony 550 Music)
- 1996: Break the Chain (Shanachie Records)
- 1998: Live at Tipitina's (Shanachie)
- 1999: Living Room (Shanachie)
- 2001: Ash Wednesday Blues (Shanachie)
- 2002: Bury the Hatchet (Shanachie) – with Big Chief Monk
- 2007: Coming Down (M.C. Records)
- 2010: American Patchwork (Alligator Records)
- 2012: Black Eye Galaxy (Alligator)
- 2013: Peace (Alligator)
- 2016: Spacedust & Ocean Views (Back on Dumaine Records)
- 2016: Flower Box (Back on Dumaine)
- 2019: Buddha & the Blues (Back on Dumaine)
- 2021: Orpheus and the Mermaids (5th Ward Records)
- 2024: Picasso's Villa (5th Ward Records)

=== Live albums ===
- 2006: Tipitina's Live (MunckMix, Inc.)
- 2008: Live at 2008 New Orleans Jazz & Heritage Festival (MunckMix, Inc.)
- 2009: Live at 2009 New Orleans Jazz & Heritage Festival (MunckMix, Inc.)
- 2011: Live at 2011 New Orleans Jazz & Heritage Festival (MunckMix, Inc.)
- 2019: Live at 2019 New Orleans Jazz & Heritage Festival (MunckMix, Inc.)
- 2022: Live at 2022 New Orleans Jazz & Heritage Festival (MunckMix, Inc.)
- 2023: Live at 2023 New Orleans Jazz & Heritage Festival (MunckMix, Inc.)

=== EPs ===
- 2013: Three Free Amigos (Alligator)

=== Singles ===
- 2016: "Lafayette" (Back on Dumaine) – from Spacedust & Oceanviews
- 2017: "Liquor Drought" (Back on Dumaine)

=== North Mississippi Allstars and Anders Osborne ===
- 2015: Freedom & Dreams (NMO Records)

== Awards ==
=== Best of the Beat Awards ===
Offbeat's Best of the Beat Awards pay tribute each year to musicians who are voted best in a variety of musical categories and genres.

Year	Category	Nominated work	Result
1995	Best Roots Rock Band/Performer		Won
1996	Best Roots Rock Band/Performer		Won
2001	Best Roots Rock Album	Ash Wednesday Blues	Won
2002	Best Roots Rock Album	Anders Osborne & Monk Boudreaux: Bury the Hatchet	Won
2003	Songwriter of the Year		Won
2004	Songwriter of the Year		Won
2007	Producer of the Year		Won
2010	Best Guitarist		Won
2010	Best Rock Roots Album	American Patchwork	Won
2010	Best Album of the Year	American Patchwork	Nominated
2011	Producer of the Year		Won
2011	Best Guitarist		Won
2011	Best Roots Rock Band/Performer		Won
2012	Song of the Year	Louisiana Gold	Won
2012	Best Guitarist		Won
2012	Songwriter of the Year		Won
2013	Producer of the Year		Won
2013	Songwriter of the Year		Won
2013	Best Rock Album	Peace	Won
2016	Best Guitarist		Won
2017	Best Rock Album	Flower Box	Won
2017	Positive Vibrations Heartbeat Award		Won
2019	Best Rock Album	Buddha & the Blues	Won

=== The Big Easy Music Awards ===
The Big Easy Music Awards recognize top male and female performers, the best album of the year and winners in 15 music categories, including blues, jazz, Cajun, zydeco, rock and others.

Year	Category	Nominated work	Result
2013	Entertainer of the Year		Won
