= Bette Smith =

American singer

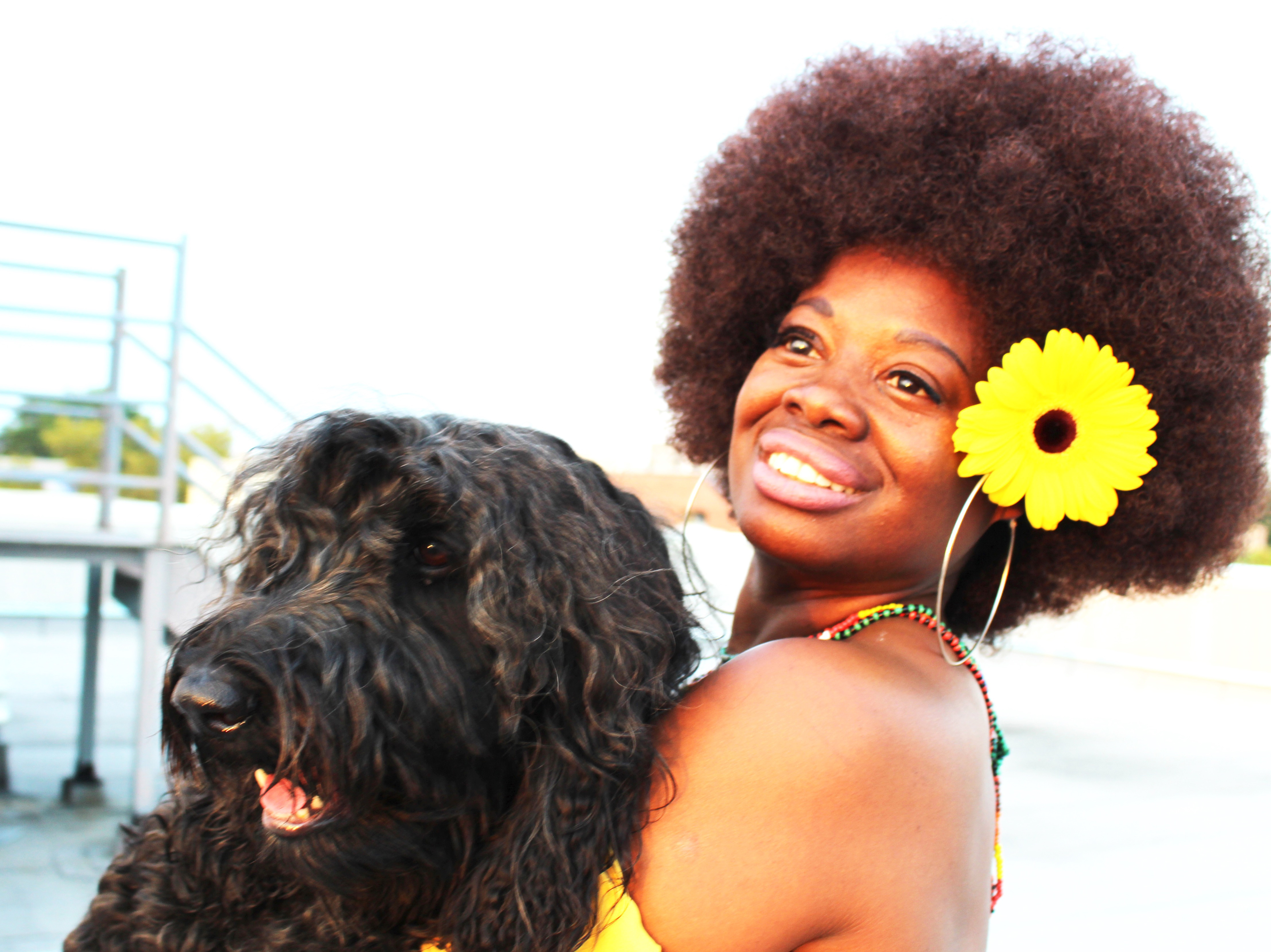
- Bette Smith in Brooklyn, New York, 2017

Background information
- Born: Brooklyn, New York, United States
- Genres: Soul; Rock; Blues
- Years active: 2005–present
- Labels: Ruf Records; Cleopatra Records; Big Legal Mess Records; Kartel Music Group
- Website: www.bettesmith.com

Bette Smith is an American soul, rock and blues singer and songwriter who has released music on the Ruf Records blues label and, as of 2024, is on the Kartel Music Group label. Of Trinidadian descent, she is a New York Blues Hall of Fame inductee and has worked work with Jimbo Mathus, Kirk Fletcher, Luther Dickinson, Patterson Hood, and Jimmy Hogarth. She tours on the North American blues festival circuit and in Europe.

== Early life ==
Sharon Meriel Kathleen Smith, known professionally as Bette Smith, grew up in the Bedford-Stuyvesant neighborhood of Brooklyn, New York. Her parents are Trinidadian. Her father, a choir director in the Seventh-day Adventist Church that the family attended, taught her to sing. She sang featured roles in the church's gospel choir.

== Career ==
=== 2010s ===
She released an album called From The Well Of My Inner Child in 2006 using the stage name "Bette Stuy." She graduated from Le Cordon Bleu College of Culinary Arts in Los Angeles in 2010, and studied at The New School in New York City, where in 2014 she earned a B.S. in Liberal Arts with an emphasis on Creative Arts Therapy, and at Columbia’s School of Social Work. To earn a living she worked as a receptionist and on Wall Street.

She was inducted into the New York Blues Hall of Fame in 2012.

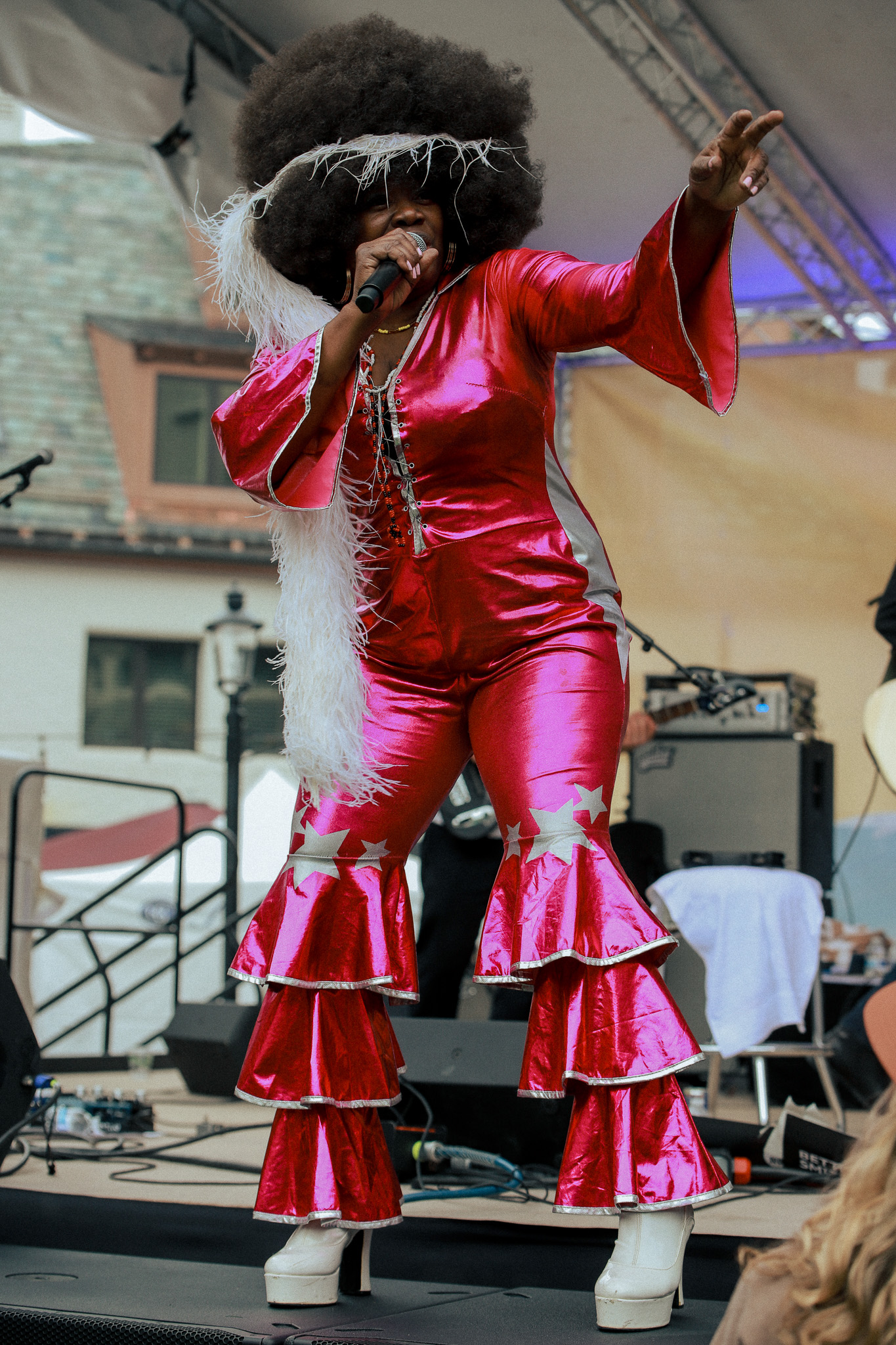
Bette Smith performing at Beaver Creek Blues Festival in Colorado, 2024

In 2013 her older brother Louis, dying of kidney failure, urged her to further pursue her dreams of becoming a professional full-time singer. Again using the name Bette Stuy, she released in 2015 the EP Introducing Bette Stuy: This is Neo Blues, put together a band, and continued playing at New York City clubs and on the street.

A musician who knew Jimbo Mathus of the Squirrel Nut Zippers heard her singing at a street fair and put her in touch with Mathus. Mathus decided he wanted to work with her. She went to Mississippi with him and, with a live band, they recorded her debut album as Bette Smith, Jetlagger.

On July 26, 2017, Billboard premiered the video for the track "Manchild." Jetlagger was released on 29 September 2017 on Big Legal Mess Records (a subsidiary of Fat Possum). It included original songs as well as covers by the Staples Singers and Isaac Hayes.

In 2018, WNYC Studios' Radiolab invited her to contribute an original song to its compilation project called 27: The Most Perfect Album, with each track inspired by one of the 27 U.S. Constitutional amendments. She chose the 13th Amendment and contributed her song "Happy Warrior."

Jetlagger received reviews in major publications. BrooklynVegan premiered the video and PopMatters the audio for the track "I Found Love."

Smith toured in Europe promoting the album, appearing in 2018 at the Montreux Jazz Festival in Switzerland and festivals in Spain, France and The Netherlands. She toured Europe again in July 2019.

=== 2020s ===
Together with Kirk Fletcher she released the single "Dance Monkey" on Cleopatra Records on 6 February 2020. Also that year the same label released her single with Jesse Johnson, "Memories." The second Bette Smith album, The Good, the Bad and the Bette, came out on 25 September 2020 on blues label Ruf Records.

Produced by Drive-By Truckers’ Matt Patton and engineer Bronson Tew, The Good, the Bad and the Bette included three songs co-written by Smith and includes contributions from Luther Dickinson from North Mississippi Allstars and Patterson Hood from Drive-By Truckers. Jim DeRogatis included it on his “Best Albums of 2020” list. The track "Fistful of Dollars" reached #1 on the Roots Music Report in April 2021. Her bookings in summer and fall 2021 included U.S. tours with the Drive-By Truckers and Kenny Wayne Shepherd, an appearance at the Telluride Blues & Brews Festival, and her own "Bustin’ Out of Brooklyn Tour ‘21." In 2022 she performed at the Kennedy Center. Her studio collaborations in 2020 and 2021 included tracks with Joe Louis Walker, Larry Brown, Fabrizio Grossi & Soul Garage Experience, and others.

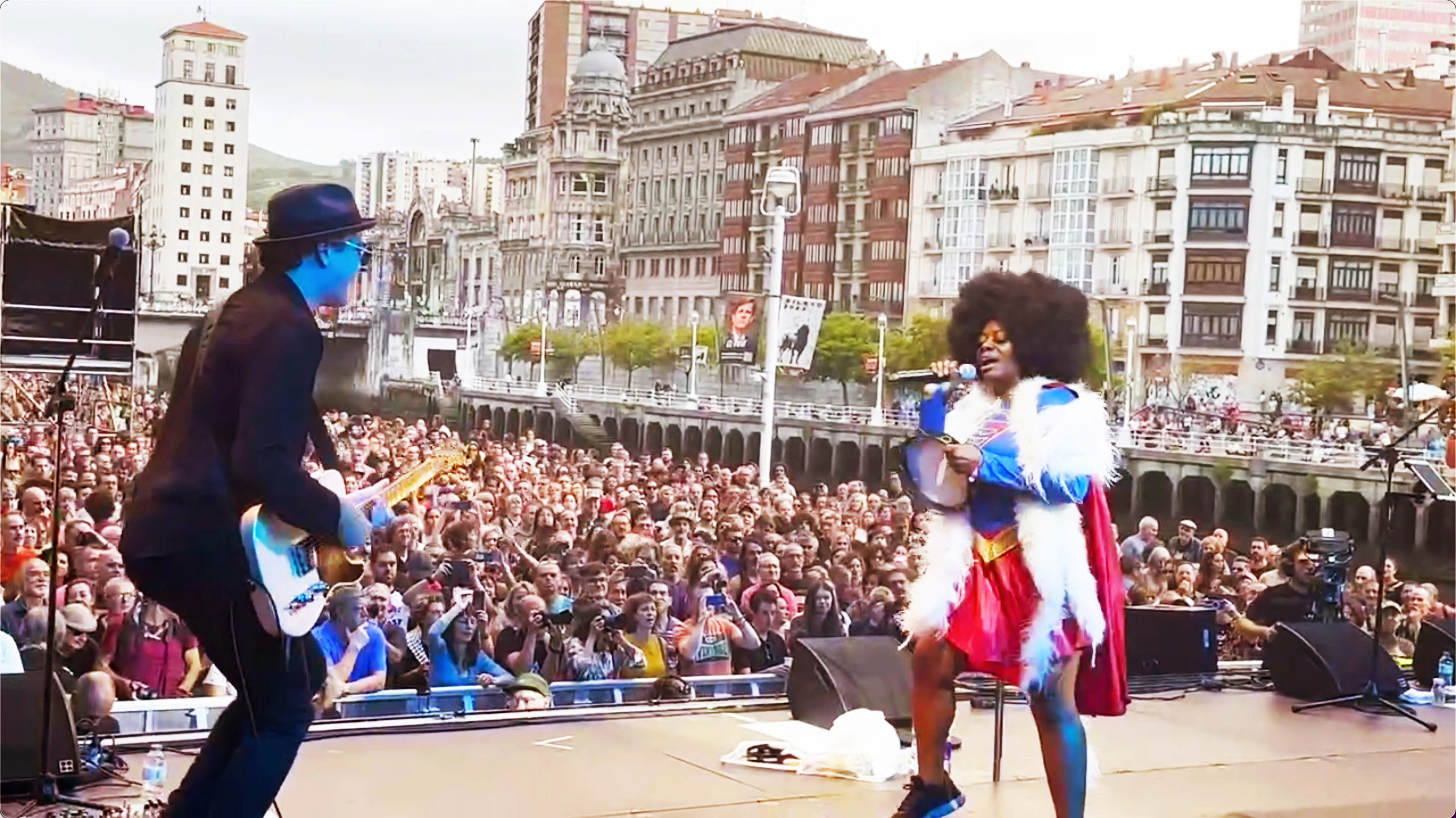
Bette Smith performing at Bilbao Blues Festival in 2023

On 25 February 2022 she and Kirk Fletcher released another single on Cleopatra Records, a cover of the Rolling Stones' "Brown Sugar." In August of that year, Cleopatra Records released Ben E. King's album Supernatural Soul which included the single "Stand By Me" performed by King, Smith and Ronnie Earl. Bootsy Collins and Rafael Riqueni were also guests on the album.

Smith's summer 2022 festival bookings included Mempho Music Festival, Calgary Folk Music Festival, Blues From The Top Festival, and Kitchener Blues Festival.

In 2023 she released two more singles with Cleopatra Records – "Tennessee Whiskey" with guitarist Harvey Mandel and "Sign Your Name" with guitarist Arthur Adams – and was invited to perform at several festivals, including the Holland International Blues Festival, Harvest Music Festival and, in early 2024, on the Legendary Rhythm & Blues Cruise with Taj Mahal, Keb' Mo', Kenny Wayne Shepherd, Shemekia Copeland and Christone "Kingfish" Ingram.

In 2023 she also recorded her third album, Goodthing, teaming with producer Jimmy Hogarth. It was released on July 12, 2024, by Kartel Music Group. The title track was public radio station KCRW's "Today's Top Tune" on May 8, the day it was released as a single, and Spotify added album tracks to two of its official playlists ("Beautiful Mess" on Retro Soul and "M.O.N.E.Y" on Nu-Blue).

In the summer of 2024 WBGO's The Art of the Story podcast and WNYC's Soundcheck featured Smith and the album, and she appeared on the MTA's "Sessions At" pop-up series in the New York City subway system.

In June 2024 she headlined the Columbia Pike Blues Festival and in October toured Europe, playing sold-out shows in London, Paris, and Milan.

In April 2025, Smith released a single covering Foreigner's "I Want To Know What Love Is" through Cleopatra Records. In the fall she released a cover of Helen Reddy's "I Am Woman."

A 2025 European summer tour included festivals and venues in Spain and Portugal, and the Comfort Festival in Italy with Warren Haynes, Ben Harper, Wolfmother, Blackberry Smoke, Joe Satriani and Steve Vai. In September 2025, Smith performed at the Palm Springs Women's Jazz Festival which also featured Ruthie Foster and Martha Redbone.

== Discography ==
=== Albums ===
Title	Artist	Year	Label	Producer
Goodthing	Bette Smith	2024	Kartel Music Group	Jimmy Hogarth
The Good, The Bad and The Bette	Bette Smith	2020	Ruf Records	Matt Patton, Bronson Tew
27: The Most Perfect Album	Bette Smith, Dolly Parton, They Might Be Giants, Devendra Banhart, Kevin Morby and Others	2018		Jad Abumrad, Suzie Lechtenberg, Julia Longoria, Alex Overington, Kelly Prime, Sarah Qari
Jetlagger	Bette Smith	2017	Big Legal Mess Records	Jimbo Mathus
Introducing Bette Stuy: This is Neo Blues	as Bette Stuy	2015		
From The Well Of My Inner Child	as Bette Stuy	2006		

=== Singles as artist ===
Title	Artist	Year	Label	Producer
"I Am Woman"	Bette Smith	2025	Cleopatra Records	
"I Want to Know What Love Is"	Bette Smith	2025	Cleopatra Records	
"Eternal Blessings"	Bette Smith	2024	Kartel Music Group	Jimmy Hogarth
"Goodthing"	Bette Smith	2024	Kartel Music Group	Jimmy Hogarth
"Beautiful Mess"	Bette Smith	2024	Kartel Music Group	Jimmy Hogarth
"M.O.N.E.Y"	Bette Smith	2024	Kartel Music Group	Jimmy Hogarth
"Happiness"	Bette Smith	2023	Kartel Music Group	Jimmy Hogarth
"Tennessee Whiskey"	Bette Smith and Harvey Mandel	2023	Cleopatra Records	
"Sign Your Name"	Bette Smith and Arthur Adams	2023	Cleopatra Records	
"Brown Sugar"	Bette Smith and Kirk Fletcher	2022	Cleopatra Records	
"Dance Monkey"	Bette Smith and Kirk Fletcher	2020	Cleopatra Records	
"Memories"	Bette Smith and Jesse Johnson	2020	Cleopatra Records	

=== Singles/tracks as featured artist ===
Title	Artist	Year	Label	Producer
"Stand By Me"	Ben E. King feat. Bette Smith and Ronnie Earl	2022	Cleopatra Records	
"Lady in Red"	Joe Louis Walker feat. Bette Smith	2021	Cleopatra Records	Scott Petito
"With or Without You"	Fabrizio Grossi & Soul Garage Experience feat. Bette Smith	2021		Fabrizio Grossi
"Life & Larry Brown: Judgement Day"	Larry Brown feat. Bette Smith et al.	2020		Fabrizio Grossi

== Personal life ==
Bette Smith lives in Brooklyn, New York. She is a cousin of gospel singer Wintley Phipps.
