= Katie Henry =

- Born: Vernon Township, New Jersey, United States
- Genre: Blues rock
- Occupations: Singer, guitarist, pianist, songwriter
- Instruments: Vocals, guitar, piano
- Years active: 2010s–present
- Website: Official website

Katie Henry is an American blues rock singer, guitarist, pianist and songwriter. She has released three albums since 2018, and signed to Ruf Records in 2022. Her album, On My Way, reached number six on the Billboard Top Blues Albums Chart.

== Life and career ==
Henry was raised in Vernon Township, New Jersey, and attended Vernon Township High School before transferring to Pope John XXIII Regional High School. She started to learn to play the piano at the age of six, and was encouraged by her music loving family giving her access to recordings by the Beatles, the Doors and Janis Joplin. Henry began writing songs in the back of her school notebooks. "Me and Bobby McGee" was the first song that she performed in public, discovering her passion for the blues after hearing Elmore James "It Hurts Me Too" through the Grateful Dead. She attended Manhattan College, playing on evenings and weekends, at open mic events and later with a Bronx-based blues band, before going solo and performing in New York blues clubs.

She self-released her debut album, High Road, on November 21, 2018, earning her national recognition, including nominations from both the International Bluegrass Music Awards and Blues Blast.

The recording processes for her sophomore album began in May 2021, at Brooklyn's Degraw Sound Studios. Henry was joined by the record producer and guitarist Ben Rice, Antar Goodwin (bass), plus Kurt Thum (piano and organ), Greg Wieczorek (drums), and the British harmonicist Giles Robson. Henry stated "We recorded the album live during the pandemic, and it was so fun to be able to record in a room with people after feeling isolated for such a long time. The majority of the album was laid down live, and I love that feeling. It's like capturing lightning in a bottle". Henry's guitar playing was more to the fore on On My Way than her previous record. On My Way was released on January 28, 2022 via Ruf Records. The critical acclaim included tributes from Henry Yates of Classic Rock, plus NME, and The Guardian, the latter of which saluted "a runaway talent you need to keep up with".

Her international debut came via her involvement with Ruf Records's 2022 Blues Caravan Revue. She appeared along with Will Jacobs and Ghalia Volt, and a CD was released of the live performance highlights. In late 2022, Henry commenced the second leg of the European tour in support of the On My Way album. By this time the record had reached a high of number six on the Billboard Top Blues Albums Chart.

Henry's third solo album, Get Goin', was released on February 23, 2024 by Ruf Records and reached number 3 on the Billboard Top Blues Albums Chart. The release was supported by a European tour with labelmates Bernard Allison and Ally Venable. She followed this with her first headlining tour in early 2025.

== Discography ==
=== Albums ===
Year	Title	Record label	Additional credits
2018	High Road	Self-released	
2022	On My Way	Ruf Records	
2022	Blues Caravan 2022	Ruf Records	Katie Henry / Will Jacobs / Ghalia Volt
2024	Get Goin'	Ruf Records	
