= A Song for My Father =

- 2007 cover (Target)

Compilation album by Various
- Released: 2007
- Recorded: c. 2006
- Genre: Pop, folk, rock
- Label: 429 Records, 180 Music

Alternative cover
- 2010 cover (429 Records)

A Song for My Father is an anthology of songs performed by the children of American musicians in the 20th century. Each performer chose a song associated with their parents.

The album was originally released in 2007 by 180 Music and was an exclusive US release, available only from Target stores. On June 1, 2010, it was re-released by 429 Records.

== Track listing ==
No.	Song title	Performer	Time	Composer
1	"Evil Ways"	Salvador Santana (son of Carlos Santana)	3:51	Clarence "Sonny" Henry
2	"Travelin' Man"	Gunnar and Matthew Nelson (sons of Ricky Nelson)	3:34	Jerry Fuller
3	"Lover's Cross"	A.J. Croce (son of Jim Croce)	3:04	Jim Croce
4	"Cat's in the Cradle"	Jen Chapin (daughter of Harry Chapin)	3:52	Harry Chapin
5	"Midnight Rider"	Devon Allman's Honeytribe (son of Gregg Allman)	3:25	Gregg Allman, Richard Payne
6	"Up on the Roof"	Louise Goffin (daughter of Gerry Goffin and Carole King)	3:27	Gerry Goffin & Carole King
7	"Bartender's Blues"	Ben Taylor (son of James Taylor)	3:05	James Taylor
8	"Soul Shake Down Party"	Ky-Mani Marley (son of Bob Marley)	2:53	Bob Marley
9	"Bird on the Wire"	Adam Cohen (son of Leonard Cohen)	2:55	Leonard Cohen
10	"Yellow Moon"	Ivan Neville (son of Aaron Neville)	4:14	Aaron Neville & Joel Neville
11	"The Warmth of the Sun"	Carnie and Wendy Wilson (daughters of Brian Wilson)	3:01	Mike Love and Brian Wilson
12	"Got A Feelin'"	Chynna Phillips (daughter of John Phillips)	2:43	Denny Doherty and John Phillips
13	"Run To Me"	Spencer Gibb and 54 Seconds (son of Robin Gibb)	4:07	Barry Gibb, Maurice Gibb, Robin Gibb
14	Coming in to Los Angeles"	Sarah Lee Guthrie (daughter of Arlo Guthrie)	2:59	Arlo Guthrie
