= Flower Box (album) =

Studio album by Anders Osborne
- Released: July 22, 2016
- Recorded: 2014 & 2015
- Genre: Rock
- Length: 48 min
- Label: Back on Dumaine Records
- Producer: Mark Howard, Anders Osborne & Chad Cromwell

Flower Box is an album by Anders Osborne that was unexpectedly released in 2016 on Back on Dumaine Records. It was the second of two albums released by Osborne in 2016, the first album being Spacedust & Ocean Views. Rex Thomson from Live for Live Music quotes that "listening to it is like finding money… you didn’t know it was coming, but your world is a happier place for its arrival. Dripping in southern blues and fuzz box guitars, Osborne and his band hit all the right notes, even if they take their time getting there."

== Track listing ==
All songs were written by Anders Osborne.

No.	Title	Length
1	Different Drum	7:00
2	Fools Gold	5:13
3	Flower Box	3:33
4	It Can't Hurt you Anymore	6:21
5	The Gospel of St. John	4:12
6	Born to Die Together	8:16
7	Old Country	9:17
8	Strong	4:22

== Personnel ==
- Mark Howard, Anders Osborne & Chad Cromwell - Producing
- Mark Howard - Mixing & Engineering
- Justin Tocket, Mark Pollack, & Nick Guttmann - Additional Engineers
- Phil Frank - Guitar Tech
- Anders Osborne- Vocals, Guitars
- Carl Dufrene Jr. - Bass, Vocals
- Brady L. Brade Jr. - Drums, Percussion
- Chad Cromwell - Drums, Percussion
- Marc Broussard - Vocals
- Scott Metzger - Guitars
- David LaBruyere - Bass
- Justin Tocket - Vocals
- Rob McNelley - Guitars
