= Jeremiah Johnson (blues musician) =

American blues singer, guitarist and songwriter

- Born: 1972 (age 53–54); St. Louis, Missouri, United States
- Genres: St. Louis blues, southern rock, country
- Occupations: Singer, guitarist, songwriter
- Instruments: Vocals, guitar
- Years active: Mid 2000s–present
- Website: Official website

Jeremiah Johnson (born 1972) is an American blues singer, guitarist and songwriter. His music blends elements of St. Louis blues, southern rock, and country. His 2016 album release, Blues Heart Attack, reached No. 5 in the Billboard Blues Albums Chart.

== Biography ==
Born in St. Louis, Missouri, United States, Johnson had parents who were both fans of blues music. His father named him for the 1972 western film of the same name. Johnson had ukulele lessons at the age of four, although his love of watching cartoons on the television meant that it was in his teenage years before he started taking guitar playing more seriously. Originally concentrating on jazz while at college and later rock music, Johnson met blues playing musicians in Soulard, St. Louis. For most of his performing career, Johnson has also worked in his day job as a billboard labourer. He spent a decade living and working on the Gulf Coast in Texas. Johnson was a first place finalist in the Houston, Texas, Regional Blues Challenge, sponsored by The Houston Blues Society in 2004, 2005 and 2006. In 2011, he was the winner of the St. Louis Blues Society International Blues Challenge, and went on to the semi-finals to represent St. Louis in Memphis, Tennessee.

In early 2009, Johnson relocated back to St. Louis, and formed the Jeremiah Johnson Band shortly thereafter.

In a review of the November 2010 release 9th & Russell, one music critic stated "everything here is 1st class: musicianship, singing, production, artwork, and especially the songs". Johnson's music was backed both by his own band and the Sliders. The latter are a horn section consisting of Jim Rosse (trumpet) and Stuart Williams (saxophone). Long-term performers on the St. Louis blues and R&B circuit, they have played in Johnnie Johnson's own band and toured with Little Feat and Bob Weir. In 2011, their joint follow-up effort, Brand Spank'n Blue, was released on CD Baby.

In 2014, film maker Gary Glenn filmed a Johnson concert as the basis of his docu-concert film named Ride the Blues. In 2015, Johnson played at the Bonita Blues Festival in Bonita Springs, Florida.

Johnson's 2014 release, Grind, spent a number of weeks on the Billboard Blues Albums Chart, with a peak position of No. 8. The album was produced by Devon Allman, and featured Yonrico Scott as guest drummer.

Johnson's 2016 release, Blues Heart Attack, spent five weeks in the top 15 and peaked at No. 5 on the Billboard Blues Chart. The album was produced by Jason McIntire and Jeremiah Johnson at Sawhorse Studios in St Louis, Missouri. Many of the songs and the album spent more than half the year in the top of the radio charts according to the Roots Music Report.

Ruf Records released Johnson's 2018 album, Straitjacket.

Ruf Records released Johnson's 2020 album, Heavens to Betsy. It debuted at No. 3 and later moved up to the No. 1 position on the Billboard Blues Chart. Reviews of Heavens to Betsy included, “…magnificent” about covers the whole of “Heaven’s To Betsy” in one word. Like they’ve dusted off the all American rock n roll songbook and given it a spruce up. Good heavens, this is a cracker.” - Maximum Volume;

== Band ==
The Jeremiah Johnson Band currently comprises:

- Jeremiah Johnson - lead/rhythm guitar and vocals
- Jeff Girardier - bass guitar and vocals
- Kyle Ray - drums and vocals (2023)
- Tom Maloney - bass guitar (fills in occasionally)

== Discography ==
Year	Title	Record label	Billing
2010	9th & Russell	Froggy Style Productions/CD Baby	The Jeremiah Johnson Band with the Sliders
2011	Brand Spank'n Blue	Froggy Style Productions/CD Baby	The Jeremiah Johnson Band with the Sliders
2014	Grind	Connor Ray Music/MDI	Jeremiah Johnson
2016	Blues Heart Attack	Connor Ray Music/MDI	The Jeremiah Johnson Band
2018	Straitjacket	Ruf Records	Jeremiah Johnson
2020	Heavens to Betsy	Ruf Records	Jeremiah Johnson
2020	Unemployed Highly Annoyed	Ruf Records	Jeremiah Johnson
2021	Blues Caravan 2020	Ruf Records	Jeremiah Johnson, Whitney Shay, Ryan Perry
2022	Hi-Fi Drive By	Ruf Records	Jeremiah Johnson
