= Mike Zito =

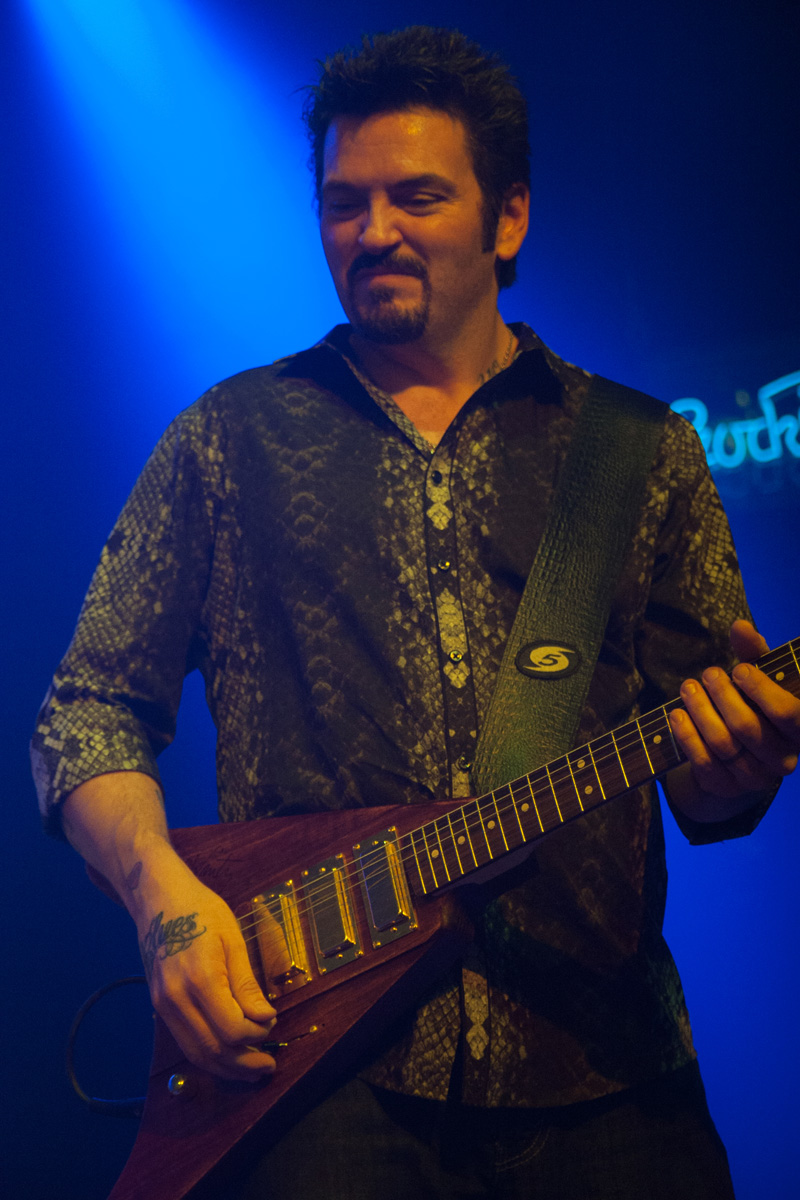
- Zito performing in Bonn, Germany, in 2012

Background information
- Born: November 19, 1970 (age 55); St. Louis, Missouri, United States.
- Genres: Blues rock
- Occupation(s): Guitarist, singer, record producer, songwriter
- Instrument(s): Guitar, vocals
- Years active: Late 2000s–present
- Formerly of: Royal Southern Brotherhood

Mike Zito (born November 19, 1970) is an American guitarist, singer, record producer, and songwriter from St. Louis, Missouri, United States. He is a co-founder of Royal Southern Brotherhood that features Cyril Neville, Devon Allman, Charlie Wooton and Yonrico Scott.

Zito started singing at the age of five and by his late teens he had begun his career in the St Louis area music scene. In 2008, Zito made his international debut on the Eclecto Groove label.

== Career ==
Zito released records on his own label and toured regionally and even performed some national dates until signing with Eclecto Groove Records in 2008. The same year, Eclecto Groove released Today. Today was produced by David Z. The musicians on the CD were a line-up of studio musicians that included bassist James "Hutch" Hutchinson; Heartbreakers and Mudcrutch keyboardist Benmont Tench; co-producer/drummer Tony Braunagel; and percussionist Michito Sanchez. Also appearing on the CD are Joe Sublett (saxophone), Darrell Leonard (trumpet), Mitch Kashmar (harmonica) with Teresa James and Ce Ce Bullard (background vocals).

In 2009, Eclecto Groove released his second CD Pearl River. Zito and Cyril Neville collaborated on the title track. At the 2010 Blues Music Awards, "Pearl River" won "Song of the Year". Pearl River was recorded in New Orleans, Louisiana at Piety Street Studios. It featured Cyril Neville, Anders Osborne, Reese Wynans, Susan Cowsill, Lynwood Slim and Johnny Sansone, with the rhythm section of Lonnie 'Popcorn' Trevino Jr. (bass) and Eric Bolivar (drums).

In 2011, Zito fulfilled his recording contract with Delta Groove/Eclecto Groove with the release of Greyhound. Greyhound was nominated for "Best Rock Blues Album" at the 2011 Blues Music Awards in Memphis, Tennessee.

In 2013, Mike Zito signed with Ruf Records and released Gone to Texas, a deep and personal CD dedicated to the state that he says saved his life. On Gone to Texas Mike assembled his band, The Wheel, which features Zito – guitars and vocals, Scot Sutherland – bass, Jimmy Carpenter – guitars/sax, and Rob Lee on drums.

=== Royal Southern Brotherhood ===
Mike Zito was in Royal Southern Brotherhood from 2010 to 2014.

Zito met Devon Allman while working together at the Guitar Center in St. Louis. The two would be reunited again through manager Rueben Williams, who managed Neville and Zito prior to signing Allman.

Zito, Cyril Neville, and Devon Allman became Royal Southern Brotherhood. The three invited rhythm section Charlie Wooton on bass, and drummer Yonrico Scott, to do a short tour. The band's first official show was at the "Rock n’ Bowl" in New Orleans. A year slipped by and the supergroup released their debut album to rave reviews.

With Jim Gaines as producer, Royal Southern Brotherhood recorded the band's debut album at Dockside recording Studio in Maurice, Louisiana. Allman, Neville and Zito shared lead vocals for the new album and Zito and Allman play twin guitar leads, a reminder of the band's related sound to the dual guitar leads played by Allman's uncle, Duane, and Dickey Betts in the Allman Brothers Band.

In May 2014, Royal Southern Brotherhood won the Blues Music Award for "Best DVD" for the band's Ruf Records release Songs From The Road – Live in Germany.

In June 2014, Royal Southern Brotherhood released their second studio CD Heartsoulblood on Ruf Records. Making the Scene described the CD as " Combining blues and soul the way they do down in N’awlins, the whole is greater than the sum of its parts." It was produced by Jim Gaines and engineered by David Z.

In early October 2014, Mike Zito left Royal Southern Brotherhood to focus on his own career.

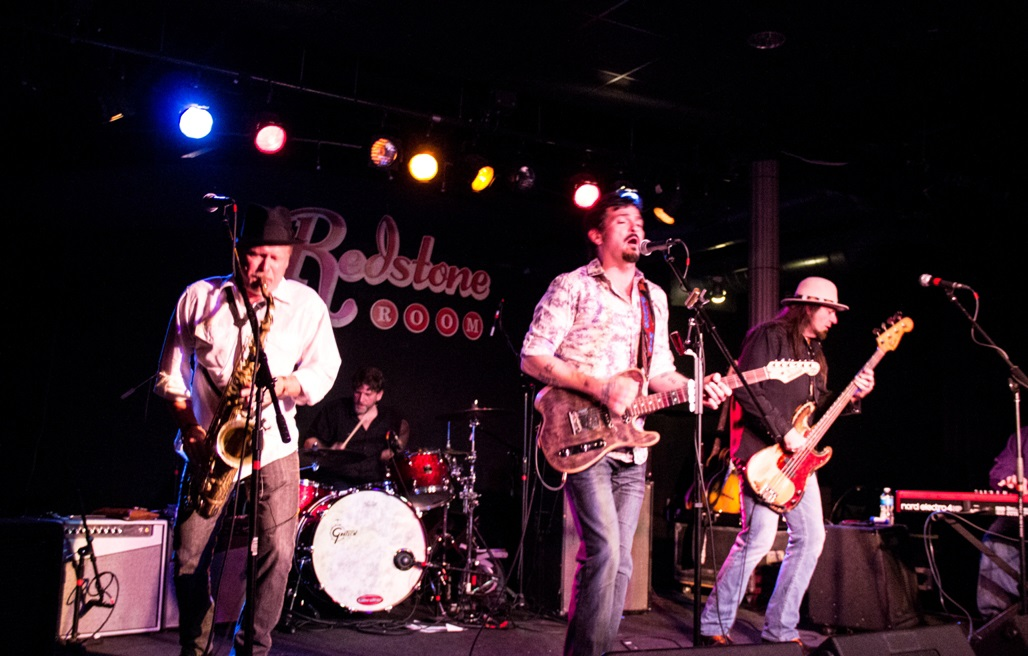
Mike Zito and The Wheel at the Redstone Room, Davenport, Indiana, May 2015

=== Film and television ===
In 2012, Zito's "Roll On", from the album Greyhound, was featured on FX's hit series Sons of Anarchy

=== Solo work ===
In 2012, Zito debuted his new band, 'The Wheel'. The Wheel features drummer Rob Lee, Scot Sutherland on bass, Lewis Stephens on keyboards, and Jimmy Carpenter on saxophone. In 2014, Mike Zito and the Wheel's album, Gone To Texas, was nominated for a Blues Music Award in the 'Rock Blues Album of the Year' category.

In May 2018, Zito's most recent album, First Class Life, debuted at No. 1 on the Billboard's Top Blues Albums Chart.

In November 2019, Zito released the tribute album Rock 'N' Roll – A Tribute To Chuck Berry, on Ruf Records. The album contains 20 tunes featuring 21 guest guitarists: Joe Bonamassa, Walter Trout, Robben Ford, Sonny Landreth, Richard Fortus, Alex Skolnick, Joanna Connor, Anders Osborne, Ryan Perry, Ally Venable, Albert Castiglia, Luther Dickinson, Jeremiah Johnson, Tommy Castro, Tinsley Ellis, Josh Smith, Kirk Fletcher, Jimmy Vivino, Kid Andersen, and introducing Charlie Berry III.

In 2020, his European tour being cancelled, Zito flew to his home in Texas and started recording his album entitled Quarantine Blues, which was released as a "free-to-download" album. It was composed, recorded and mixed in 14 days with musicians in different cities, including a featured appearance from guitarist Tracii Guns, a founding member of L.A. Guns, collaborating from quarantine in Denmark. He received his second Blues Music Award in 2025 in the 'Blues Rock Album of the Year' category, for his recording, Life is Hard.

== Discography ==
=== As solo artist ===
- Blue Room (Zarkie Records, 1998; reissue: Ruf Records, 2018)
- America's Most Wanted (Studio No Production, 2000)
- Slow It Down (Mike Zito, 2004)
- Superman (Mike Zito, 2006)
- Real Strong Feeling (Mike Zito/Marz Music, 2007 [2009])
- Today (Eclecto Groove, 2008)
- Pearl River (Eclecto Groove, 2009)
- Live from The Top (Mike Zito, 2010; reissue: Gulf Coast Records, 2019)
- Greyhound (Eclecto Groove, 2011)
- Make Blues Not War (Ruf Records, 2016)
- First Class Life (Ruf Records, 2018)
- Blues Caravan 2018 (with Vanja Sky, Bernard Allison) (Ruf Records, 2018)
- Rock 'n' Roll – A Tribute To Chuck Berry (Ruf Records, 2019)
- Quarantine Blues (Gulf Coast Records, 2020)
- Resurrection (Gulf Coast Records, 2021)
- Blues for the Southside (Gulf Coast Records, 2022)
- Blood Brothers with Albert Castiglia (Gulf Coast Records, 2023)
- Blood Brothers Live In Canada with Albert Castiglia (Gulf Coast Records, 2023)
- Life Is Hard (Gulf Coast Records, 2024)
- Help Yourself with Albert Castiglia (Gulf Coast Records, 2025)

=== With Royal Southern Brotherhood ===
- Royal Southern Brotherhood (Ruf Records, 2012)
- Songs from the Road – Live in Germany (Ruf Records, 2013)
- Heartsoulblood (Ruf Records, 2014)

=== With The Wheel ===
- Gone to Texas (Ruf Records, 2013)
- Songs from the Road [recorded live 1/10/14 at 'Dosey Doe' in The Woodlands, TX] (Ruf Records, 2014)
- Keep Coming Back (Ruf Records, 2015)
- Bootleg 12/31/14 [live Creedence Clearwater Revival tribute] (Mike Zito, 2015)
