= Royal Southern Brotherhood =

American supergroup

- Origin: New Orleans, Louisiana, United States
- Genres: Blues rock; Southern rock
- Years active: 2011–present
- Label: Ruf Records
- Members: Cyril Neville; Devon Allman; Bart Walker; Yonrico Scott; Charlie Wooton
- Website: royalsouthernbrotherhood.com

Royal Southern Brotherhood is an American supergroup, consisting of singer and percussionist Cyril Neville, vocalist and guitarist Devon Allman, vocalist and guitarist Mike Zito, drummer Yonrico Scott, and bassist Charlie Wooton. The band released their debut album on May 8, 2012.

== History ==
=== Formation and debut album (2011–2012) ===
Royal Southern Brotherhood came together in New Orleans, Louisiana during 2011. Reuben Williams, manager to both Neville and Zito, had the idea for the band. The two had collaborated on "Pearl River", the title track for Zito's 2009 album, and it went on to win the Blues Music Award "Song of the Year".

Zito suggested Devon Allman, who was skeptical of the supergroup idea at first. According to Allman when his manager broached the subject he replied "Dude are you crazy? Thats like putting five quarterbacks in a room and saying 'go play football'. What the Hell are you talking about?" However, Allman thought it over and decided he liked the concept. Allman and Zito were old acquaintances, having been friendly musical rivals in the St. Louis, Missouri music scene and had worked together managing a Guitar Center store in 1999.

According to Allman, "we went from talking about the idea, to me and Cyril writing a tune over email, to being in rehearsals, all in two months." With the union of the three noted front men, the group next added bassist Wooton and drummer Scott to form the rhythm section. One unique aspect of the band is the wide difference in ages. At 37, Allman is the youngest while 63-year-old Cyril Neville is the eldest. Said Allman of the group:"It's like it was meant to be. We're not really reinventing the wheel here. We're just making sure it keeps rolling. I think certain fans out there really have an affinity for music based in soul and blues and rock, classic rock, so you really get that with this band." The group made its stage debut in September 2011 at the Rock ’n’ Bowl in New Orleans.

In December 2011, the band recorded songs for their debut album over five days at Dockside Studio, a 12-acre estate on the banks of Vermilion Bayou, in Maurice, Louisiana. In the spring of 2012, they gathered to rehearse for their tour, at Don Odell's Legends Studio in Palmer, Massachusetts. While in Palmer, they also taped a segment for the "Legends" TV program distributed through public-access cable stations. As of September, 2012 the band had made extensive tour stops across the United States and in fourteen foreign countries.

== Reception ==
The band's self-titled first album was released on May 8, 2012. It debuted at number five on the Billboard Blues chart, and number thirty on the Heatseekers album chart, which includes all music genres. In reviewing the album for The Boston Globe, critic Scott McLennan said: "Royal Southern Brotherhood is neither brilliant turn nor crazy risk for the five musicians involved – it’s both" and the band "is creating music that is simultaneously progressive and traditional – rock, blues, and funk flow freely – yet sounds distinct from their individual repertoires, so all involved are taking a chance."

The Blues Rock Review gave the album an eight out of ten, stating the band ...crowns a new age of southern rock, forming quite the super group of blues‐infused artists.. and the band come straight out of the gate and hit the ground running with their debut. If one thing is certain, these guys know how to create inspirational music, offering a full package of talented musicians who come together effortlessly as if it were only a matter of time.

In 2013, Royal Southern Brotherhood was nominated for a Blues Music Award in the 'Rock Blues Album' category.

In 2014, they won for a Blues Music Award in the 'DVD of the Year' category for Songs From The Road. In October that year, Mike Zito left the band and Nashville guitarist Bart Walker joined. In April 2014 Allman played his final show with Royal Southern Brotherhood at the Wanee Festival in Live Oak, FL. Tyrone Vaughan (son of Jimmie Vaughan and nephew of Stevie Ray Vaughan) joined the band to create the new guitar line up.

In January 2015, Royal Southern Brotherhood recorded the band's fourth release, Don't Look Back: The Muscle Shoals Sessions, at Fame Studio in Muscle Shoals, Alabama.

On December 2, 2015, Cyril Neville was presented along with Dr. John the 'Louie Award' for their dedication to preserving and promoting the cultural legacy of Louis Armstrong at the Museum's annual gala which included a Royal Southern Brotherhood performance. For his part, Neville says, It is an extreme privilege to be honored by the Louis Armstrong House Museum and to honor Satchmo myself at the Gala. I've read that Jazz Music is the only true art form America has contributed to the world, which means Louis Armstrong is the Roux of the musical Gumbo that America is still serving to the world. Funkaliciously.

== Band members ==
- Cyril Neville – vocals, percussion
- Bart Walker – guitar
- Tyrone Vaughan – guitar

== Past members ==
- Mike Zito – vocals, guitar – 2011–2014
- Devon Allman – guitar, vocals – 2011–2014
- Charlie Wooton – bass guitar
- Will Knaak – guitar
- Yonrico Scott – drums (2011–2019 his death)

== Discography ==
- 2012: Royal Southern Brotherhood
- 2013: Songs From The Road – Live in Germany (CD + DVD)
- 2014: Heartsoulblood
- 2015: Don't Look Back: The Muscle Shoals Sessions
- 2016: The Royal Gospel
