= Skybombers =

Rock band from Melbourne, Australia

- Also known as: Collusion
- Origin: Melbourne, Victoria, Australia
- Genres: Garage rock, indie
- Members: Hugh Gurney; Sam Bethune; Will Brown; Scott McMurtrie
- Past members: Ravi Sharma
- Website: www.facebook.com/skybombers www.myspacce.com/skybombers www.fur.com.au/artists/skybombers

Skybombers are an Australian rock band from Melbourne. They were formed as Collusion by Scotch College students Hugh Gurney, Ravi Sharma, Scott McMurtrie and Sam Bethune. They later changed to Skybombers, a name inspired by an icy-pole. Their placing a demo song "It Goes Off" on MySpace brought them their first TV appearances. They had early international attention when "It Goes Off" of their EP Sirens made the most-played list on L.A.'s Indie 103.1 and played a showcase gig at The Viper Room. They have toured Australia, Japan and USA. and their debut album Take Me To Town was recorded in L.A. with Rick Parker (Black Rebel Motorcycle Club). The band made their way on video game media in 2007 when "It Goes Off" appeared on the soundtrack for Burnout Dominator, the song later reappeared on Burnout Paradise in early 2008. Black Carousel was recorded in LA, again with Rick Parker at the helm.

== Discography ==
=== Albums ===
List of albums, with selected details
Title	Details
Take Me to Town	Released: June 2008; Label: Albert Productions (88697305782); Format: CD, Digital download
Black Carousel	Released: 2012; Label: 429 Records (FTN17812); Format: CD, digital download

=== Extended plays ===
List of extended plays, with selected details and chart positions
Title	Details	Peak chart positions
Title	Details	AUS Physical
Sirens	Released: 2007; Label: FUR Records (FR783); Formats: CD, digital download	75

=== Singles ===
List of singles, with selected chart positions
Title	Year	Peak chart positions	Album
Title	Year	AUS	Album
"Always Complaining"	2008	90	Take Me to Town
"If You Wanna Be the One"	2008	—	Take Me to Town
"Love Me Like You Used to Do..."	2010	—	Black Carousel
