= Billy Iuso =

American guitarist and singer-songwriter (born 1969)

- Born: January 26, 1969 (age 57)
- Origin: New York City - New Orleans
- Genres: rock
- Years active: 1991 – present

Billy Iuso (born January 26, 1969, in Port Chester, New York) is a New Orleans–based guitarist, singer and songwriter. In addition to performing solo and collaborating with artists such as Anders Osborne and George Porter Jr., he is the leader of Billy Iuso and the Restless Natives and a member of Dead Feat, which features former and current members of Little Feat and The Grateful Dead.

== Early career ==
Iuso’s first major musical success came in the early ‘90s after he formed the funk jam band, Brides of Jesus, which played frequently at Wetlands Preserve in New York, released three albums between 1991 and 1994, and opened for groups on the scene such as The Dave Matthews Band.

Brides of Jesus also opened for The Meters numerous times, connecting Iuso with Meters members Porter and Art Neville. Those relationships eventually inspired the guitarist to relocate to New Orleans permanently, which he did in 1996. Shortly thereafter, the Brides of Jesus, which eventually included drummer Russell Batiste, Jr. were featured on the Rounder Records compilation "Ain't No Funk Like N.O. Funk," produced by Scott Billington.

== Career ==
Once he settled in New Orleans, Iuso began performing regularly with a variety of local players including Osborne and The Wild Magnolias. He also worked as a tour and stage manager for The Neville Brothers, the Meters and Porter's Runnin’ Pardners band. In 2002, Iuso returned to focusing on his own music and created the Restless Natives, which served as the Wild Magnolias' backing band in the mid to late 2000s.

Today, Iuso performs solo. and as an "artist-at-large" at various festivals on the jam band scene.

In 2013, Iuso's album, "Naked" was given a positive review by Offbeat magazine, which noted the guitarist's departure from a jam-heavy approach to one in which he focused on song structure and development; the tracks also featured Iuso on lead vocals. Iuso's longtime collaborator Anders Osborne appeared on the album as well.

In addition to his solo work, Iuso performs with drummer Bill Kreutzmann of the Grateful Dead and Paul Barrere and Fred Tackett of Little Feat in Dead Feat. The group formed after Iuso staged a fundraiser for late Little Feat member Richie Hayward prior to his 2010 death of complications from lung disease

== Personal life ==
Iuso lives in New Orleans with his wife and children. His daughter appears on his album, "Trippin’." As of 2014, his son was enrolled as a drumming student at the New Orleans Center for Creative Arts

== Discography (as a leader) ==
- Live at Jazz Fest 2014 (2014)
- Naked (2013)
- Trippin' (2011)
- Live at the Sandpiper, Billy Iuso and the Restless Natives (2010)
- Paradise Lost and Found, Billy Iuso and the Restless Natives (2008)
- When Can I Come Home, Billy Iuso and the Restless Natives (2006)
- Restless Natives, Billy Iuso and the Restless Natives (2004)
- Saints and Sinners, Brides of Jesus (2001)
- For Real, Brides of Jesus (1997)
- What's Gonna Set You Free, Brides of Jesus (1994)
- Digital Graffiti, Brides of Jesus (1993)

== Discography (with others) ==
- Three Free Amigos, Anders Osborne (2013)
- Black Eye Galaxy, Anders Osborne (2012)
- Follow Your Dreams, Russell Batiste (2010)
- Six Strings Down (2008)
