= Javier Vargas (musician) =

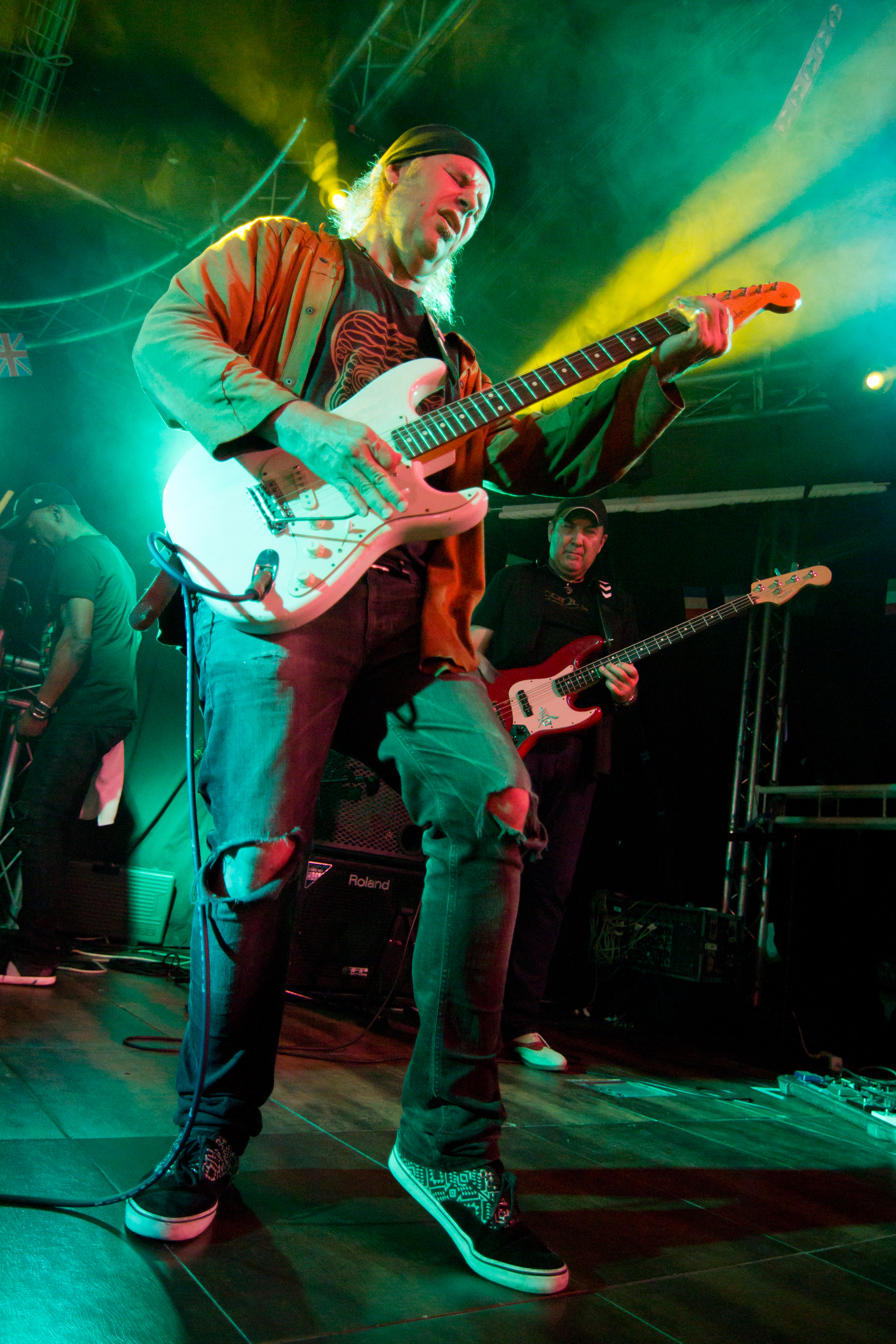
- Vargas Blues Band live in 2015

Background information
- Born: Javier Vargas; 1958 (age 66–67); Madrid, Spain
- Genres: Blues
- Occupation: Musician
- Instrument: Guitar
- Years active: 1991–present
- Labels: Dro Atlantic
- Website: www.vargasblues.com

Javier Vargas (born 1958) is a Spanish blues guitarist. Born in Madrid, Spain, to Argentine parents who had emigrated to Spain from Buenos Aires, he founded the Vargas Blues Band in 1991, the year they released their first recording, All Around Blues. Since 1992, he has recorded on the Dro-Atlantic (Warner Music Group, Spain) label. He regularly tours Europe and Spain with his band, also playing at the 30th Anniversary Montreux Jazz Festival.

== Discography ==
- All Around Blues (1991)
- Madrid-Memphis (1992)
- Blues Latino (1994)
- Texas Tango (1995)
- Gipsy Boogie (1997)
- Feedback (1998)
- Bluestrology (1998) y (2000)
- Madrid-Chicago Live (1999)
- The Best of... Vargas Blues Band (2001)
- Last Night VBB (2002)
- Espíritu Celeste (Tributo al Rock Argentino) (2002)
- Chill Latin Blues (2003)
- El Alma (2003)
- Spanish Fly (2003)
- Love, Union, Peace (2004)
- Lost & Found (2007)
- Mojo Protection (2008)
- Flamenco Blues Experience (2008)
- Vargas Blues Band, Comes Alive with Friends (2009)
- Mojo Protection Revisited (2010)
- Vargas, Bogert & Appice (feat. Shortino) + Live Wire (BONUS CD) (2011)
- Vargas Blues Band & Company (2012)
- Heavy City Blues (2013)
- From the dark (2014)
- Hard Time Blues (2016)
- Cambalache & Bronca (2017)
- King of the Latin Blues (2018)
- Vargas & Jagger - Move On, ''feat. John Byron Jagger (2019)
- Del sur (2020)
- The Very Best of Vargas Blues Band (2020)
