= Ghalia Volt =

- Also known as: Ghalia
- Born: Ghalia Vauthier; Brussels, Belgium
- Genres: Blues rock, hill country blues
- Occupations: Singer, guitarist, drummer, songwriter
- Instruments: Vocals, guitar, drums
- Years active: 2010s–present
- Label: Ruf Records

Ghalia Vauthier, known professionally as Ghalia Volt, is a Belgian blues rock singer, guitarist, drummer and songwriter. She has been involved in the release of five albums since 2016, including Mississippi Blend (2019) released on Ruf Records. It peaked at number three on the Billboard Top Blues Albums Chart.

== Career ==
She was born in Brussels, Belgium. She began her musical journey busking on the streets of her nation's capital city. Volt went on to front Ghalia & The Naphtalines, a rhythm and blues outfit and then joined company with Voodoo Casino, with whom she recorded her first album in 2016. However her desire to trace the roots of blues music saw her travel to the United States, where she began busking in 2013. She traversed around taking in Chicago, St. Louis, Memphis and Nashville, Tennessee, and then the Deep South. Her familiar presence in Clarksdale, Mississippi, saw her take part in the town's own musical event, the Sunflower River Blues & Gospel Festival, for three consecutive years. In early 2016, Volt met up with the New Orleans–based band, Johnny Mastro & Mama's Boys. This led to a collaboration, resulting in the release of Let the Demons Out (2017). It assisted in helping to establish her presence in the United States. The German independent record label, Ruf Records heard some demo tracks and arranged a full recording at studios in New Orleans. On the strength of the issue of Let the Demons Out, Volt and her backing band played at concerts in the United States and in parts of Europe. Let the Demons Out peaked at number 29 Billboard Top Blues Albums Chart in early 2018.

Wishing to embrace the feelings and style of hill country blues on her own, Volt sought out recording facilities at the Luther and Cody Dickinson owned Zebra Ranch, in Coldwater, Mississippi. The resultant album, Mississippi Blend (2019), included contributions from Cody Dickinson and Cedric Burnside sharing percussion duties, with Watermelon Slim supplying harmonica work on five tracks. Volt was the vocalist on every number and also played lead (often slide guitar) or rhythm guitar. She also wrote six of the tracks and co-wrote three others. The set included her version of "Wade in the Water". The album peaked at number three on three occasions on the Billboard Top Blues Albums Chart.

In March 2020, at the outset of the COVID-19 pandemic in the United States, Volt had to decide how to proceed. She stated that a one-woman approach may be a possibility, "I started playing on a real drum set, playing a kick, snare and hi-hat plus a tambourine with my two feet, while playing slide/guitar and singing at the same time". She tried the formula at shows in Mississippi and, by August, had committed to that approach. As inspiration for her song writing, Volt decided to travel for a month by Amtrak across an ever changing landscape afforded by Louisiana, Texas, New Mexico, Arizona, California, Nevada, Utah, Wyoming, Colorado, Kansas, Nebraska, Iowa, Illinois, Missouri, Tennessee, Kentucky, Arkansas and back to Mississippi. Volt recorded that November in the Royal Studios in Memphis, Tennessee. The album was recorded in real time without any multi-tracking, with Volt providing the bulk of the instrumentation. Her guests included Dean Zucchero, who provided bass guitar on two sides, while Monster Mike Welch added his guitar expertise to a couple of tracks including, "Evil Thoughts". Her own material predominated, but she did include her version of the blues standard, "It Hurts Me Too". Volt also co-produced the album with Lawrence "Boo" Mitchell. The album was released on January 29, 2021, on Ruf Records.

In August 2021, Volt undertook a four song long, 'Jam in the Van' live recording, in Mammoth Lakes, California; the results of which were released as an EP.

== Discography ==
=== Albums and EPs ===
Year	Title	Record label	Billed as
2016	Have You Seen My Woman		Ghalia & Voodoo Casino
2017	Let the Demons Out	Ruf Records	Ghalia & Mama's Boys
2019	Mississippi Blend	Ruf Records	Ghalia
2020	One Woman Band	Ruf Records	Ghalia Volt
2021	Jam in the Van: Ghalia Volt	Jam in the Van	Ghalia Volt
2023	Shout Sister Shout!	Ruf Records	Ghalia Volt
2026	Burn the House Down	Ruf Records	Ghalia Volt
