= Ruf Records =

German record label

- Founded: 1994
- Founder: Thomas Ruf
- Genre: Blues
- Country of origin: Germany
- Location: Lindewerra, Eichsfeld, Thuringia
- Official website: www.rufrecords.de

Ruf Records is a German independent record label, which was founded in 1994 by Luther Allison’s manager, Thomas Ruf, to promote Allison's career. The motto of the blues label is "Where Blues Crosses Over". The company's office is located in Lindewerra, Germany. As of 2008, Ruf had produced 120 releases, sold over one million albums, received two Grammy nominations and ten Blues Music Award nominations.

Past and present artists include Luther Allison, his son Bernard Allison, Louisiana Red, Eric Bibb, Canned Heat, Joanna Connor, Kevin Coyne, Sue Foley, Friend 'n Fellow, Larry Garner, Michael Hill's Blues Mob, Candye Kane, Omar & The Howlers, Aynsley Lister, Laurence Jones, Skinny Molly, Joanne Shaw Taylor, Dani Wilde, Oli Brown, Ana Popović, Shakura S'Aida, Spooky Tooth, Samantha Fish, Walter Trout, Bette Smith, Big Daddy Wilson, and Erja Lyytinen.

In 2007, Ruf Records received the Keeping the Blues Alive Award from the Blues Foundation of Memphis, Tennessee.

Since 2005, each year a group of musicians tours in the course of the 'Blues Caravan' project. In 2011, these were Cassie Taylor, Dani Wilde and Samantha Fish as 'Girls With Guitars' supported by drummer Denis Palatin. For the re-edition in 2012, Cassie Taylor was replaced by Victoria Smith.

In 2012, Ruf Records signed the Royal Southern Brotherhood, a supergroup which featured the Grammy Award winning Cyril Neville, Devon Allman, Mike Zito, Charlie Wooton and Yonrico Scott. The band was based from New Orleans, and released their first recording Royal Southern Brotherhood in the summer of 2012. John Wirt of the Baton Rouge, Louisiana newspaper The Advocate, wrote "Zito and Allman also play twin guitar leads that recall, of course, the dual guitar leads played by his uncle, Duane, and Dickey Betts in the Allman Brothers Band."

In March 2014, Albert Castiglia signed a recording contract with Ruf. In 2015 Eliana Cargnelutti released two albums with Ruf. In 2017, Vanessa Collier released her second album, Meeting My Shadow, on Ruf Records. In February 2020, Whitney Shay released her third album, Stand Up, on the label. In 2021, Ghalia Volt released her third album, One Woman Band, on Ruf Records. Katie Henry's, On My Way, was released on January 28, 2022, on Ruf Records.

== See also ==
- List of record labels
