= A. J. Ghent =

American singer-songwriter

A.J. Ghent [ j-ent ]
- Born: September 18, 1986 (age 38); Fort Pierce, Florida, U.S.
- Genres: Blues; rock; R&B
- Instruments: Guitar
- Years active: 1997–present
- Labels: Indie
- Website: www.ajghent.com

A.J. Ghent [ j-ent ], also known as Aubrey Ghent Jr., (born September 18, 1986, in Fort Pierce, Florida) is a third-generation singer-songwriter, Record producer and lap and pedal steel guitar player. Ghent has become known through many viral videos, for making his guitar sing.

Ghent was born into a legacy of famous lap steel guitar players such as his great uncle Willie Eason, grandfather Henry Nelson, and father Aubrey Ghent Sr, who greatly influenced his son's career. His grandfather Henry Nelson was the founder of the "Sacred Steel" rhythmic style played by many steel guitarists today including Robert Randolph, The Lee Boys, The Campbell Brothers. AJ Ghent's debut studio album (March 16, 2018), The Neo Blues Project, debuted No. 7 on the Blues Billboard Chart, and reached the No. 11 spot on the Top 50 Blues Rock Roots Music Report in February 2018.

== Noted performances ==
- Ghent was the leader of AJ Ghent Band and toured supporting Zac Brown Band in 2013–2014.
- Ghent performed with Colonel Bruce Hampton in 2013.
- Ghent performed "One Way Out" with The Allman Brothers in March 2012 at The Beacon Theatre in New York City
- Ghent also performed with Derek Trucks and Susan Tedeschi in Minnesota in June 2012

== Recordings ==
Albums / EPs
Year	Title	Artist	Format
2018	The Neo Blues Project	AJ Ghent [ j-ent ]	Digital Download, CD
2015	Live At Terminal West	AJ Ghent Band	Digital Download, CD

Singles
Year	Single	Artist	Album
2017	"Heartbeat"	AJ Ghent	Heartbeat
2016	"Love Me No Mo'"	AJ Ghent Band	Love Me No Mo'
2013	"Elevator Love"	AJ Ghent Band	Elevator Love
2012	"One Way Out"	The Allman Brothers Band	The Allman Brothers Band Live March 2012

== Bibliography ==
- Robert L. Stone, Sacred Steel: Inside an African American Steel Guitar Tradition (University of Illinois Press, 2010)
