= Wanee Music Festival =

Music festival in Live Oak, Florida, United States

Coordinates: 30.3940°N 82.9430°W

Wanee Festival
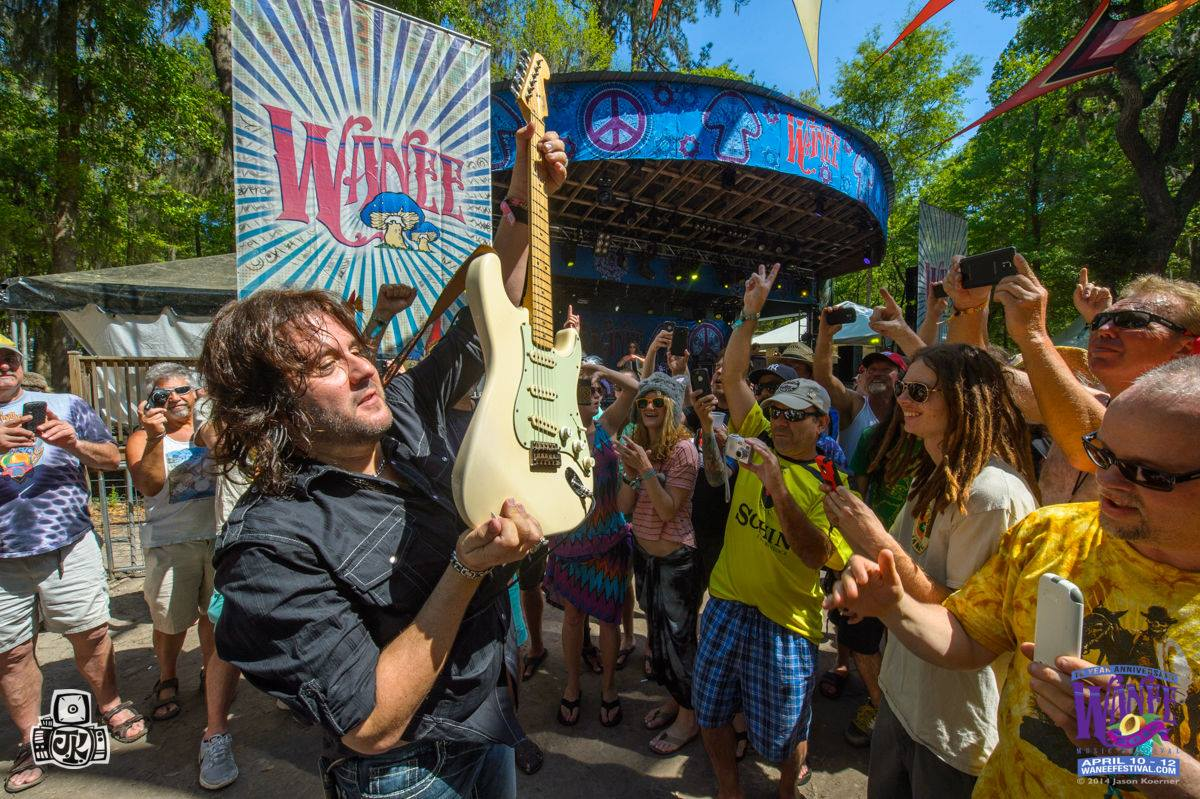
- Sean Chambers visits the crowd at the 2014 Wanee Festival
- Genre: Jam band music
- Locations: Live Oak, Florida
- Years active: 2005–present
- Founders: Butch Trucks and Gregg Allman
- Website: Wanee Festival

Wanee Festival was an annual event held 2005–2018 at the Spirit of the Suwannee Music Park, in Live Oak, Florida. The festival was hosted by the Allman Brothers Band until 2014 and was managed by Live Nation. No plans for future Wanee Festivals have been announced.

== Overview ==
The festival, hosted by the Allman Brothers Band until 2014 and managed by Live Nation, is held outdoors on two stages (Peach Stage & Mushroom Stage). In later years, The Porch Stage, The Traveling Stage and The Campground Stage have been added and are frequently used now. The Wanee Festival has featured as little as 11 bands/artists its inaugural year to as many as 44 bands/artists in 2011.

In recent years, the Wanee Festival has gone from a two-day- to a three-day-long festival. Even though the official festival is only three days long, many festival goers arrive early for the Wanee Kickoff Party, known as Wanee Wednesday, which features less well known artists and is typically the night before the opening day of the festival.

The event is generally held in the spring. In addition to the headlining Allman Brothers Band, the festival has featured performances by band members with their own bands, including The Derek Trucks Band, Oteil (Burbridge) and the Peacemakers and Gov't Mule (Warren Haynes). Other guests have included DJ Logic, Big Gigantic, Galactic, Hot Tuna, Lotus, Stephen Marley, Grateful Dead Alumni Bob Weir and Ratdog, Widespread Panic, Stephen Stills, the Black Keys, Junior Brown, Griffin Anthony, The Doobie Brothers, Buddy Guy, Furthur, JJ Grey & Mofro, Little Feat and Zappa Plays Zappa.

== Line up by year ==
=== 2005 ===
the 2005 festival held April 15–16 featuring Allman Brothers Band, Govt. Mule, Derek Trucks Band, Oteil & The Peacemakers, Yellowman, Ekoostic Hookah, Dark Star, Tea Leaf Green, Galactic, The John Popper Project, and Robert Randolph & The Family Band

=== 2006 ===
The 2006 festival held April 14–15 featuring Allman Brothers Band, Govt. Mule, Derek Trucks Band, Oteil & The Peacemakers, Jack Pearson, The Wailers, O.A.R., Railroad Earth, Dumpstaphunk, The Lee Boys, Medeski Martin & Wood, John Popper, Dirty Dozen Brass Band, New Monsoon, North Mississippi All Stars and Honeytribe.

=== 2007 ===
The 2007 festival held April 13–14 featuring The Allman Brothers Band, Gov't Mule, The Derek Trucks Band, Oteil Burbridge & The Peacemakers, Robert Randolph and the Family Band, Rusted Root, Nickel Creek, The Radiators (American band), Sister Hazel, Bononbos Convergence, Keller Williams, Rose Hill Drive, Honeytribe, Scrapomatic, Backyard Tire Fire, Phonograph and Tift Merritt

=== 2008 ===
The 2008 festival held on April 11–12 Allman Brothers Band Gov't Mule, Bob Weir & RatDog, Levon Helm and THE LEVON HELM BAND, Moe (band), JJ Grey & Mofro, Del McCoury Band, The Greyboy Allstars, Junior Brown, Oteil Burbridge & The Peacemakers, Papa Mali, PORTER*BATISTE*STOLZ, RANDALL BRAMBLETT BAND, LARRY McCRAY BAND, Tinsley Ellis, Scrapomatic, The Frequency, Devon Allman’S Honeytribe, Bonobos Convergence, Inca Maya, Little Brown Peach, Tucci, Special Saturday midnight set with Derek Trucks & Susan Tedeschi Soul Stew Revival

=== 2009 ===
The 2009 festival was held on June 5–7 and featured artists: Allman Brothers Band, Doobie Brothers, Grace Potter, Buddy Guy, Drive-By Truckers, The Wailers, Umphrey's McGee, Little Feat, Gov't Mule, Keller Williams, The Derek Trucks Band, Susan Tedeschi, Mocean Worker, The Radiators, Dumpstaphunk, Jorma Kaukonen, Arc Angels, Hill Country Revue, Devon Allman's Honeytribe, Bill Kreutzmann, Jaimoe's Jasssz Band, Col. Bruce Hampton, Blowing Trees, and Bonobos Convergence

=== 2010 ===
The 2010 event was held April 16–17 and featured artists: The Allman Brothers Band, Widespread Panic, Gov’t Mule, Tedeschi Trucks Band, Scaring the Children featuring Bob Weir Rob Wasserman & Jay Lane, Stephen Stills, The Black Keys, Dr. John, Hot Tuna Electric, 7 Walkers featuring Bill Kreutzmann & Papa Mali, JJ Grey & Mofro, Parliament Funkadelic featuring Johnny Winter and George Clinton, The Funky Meters, The Wailers, Sharon Jones and The Dap-Kings, North Mississippi Allstars, A Family Affair with Ivan Neville’s Dumpstaphunk (performing Sly & The Family Stone), Jaimoe’s Jasssz Band, Chuck Leavell with The Randall Bramblett Band, Particle; Oteil Burbridge and Kofi Burbridge with The Lee Boys, Col. Bruce Hampton, Devon Allman’s Honeytribe, Scrapomatic, Bobby Lee Rodgers Trio and Bonobos Convergence.

=== 2011 ===
The 2011 event was held April 14–16 and in addition to the Allman Brothers and Widespread Panic the festival will the Steve Miller Band, Robert Plant and the Band of Joy, Wanda Jackson, Warren Haynes Band, Tedeschi Trucks Band, Jaimoe’s Jasssz Band, Ween, Stephen Marley, Sharon Jones & The Dap-Kings, Mike Gordon, Hot Tuna, 7 Walkers Feat. Bill Kreutzmann, Galactic, Taj Mahal, North Mississippi Allstars, Keller Williams, John Popper & The Duskray Troubadours, The Radiators, Wanda Jackson, Rusted Root, Oteil Burbidge and The Lee Boys, Dirty Dozen Brass Band, Big Gigantic, Melvin Seals & JGB, Karl Denson’s Tiny Universe, Ivan Neville’s Dumpstaphunk, New Deal, Lotus, Tea Leaf Green, DJ Logic, Toubab Krewe, Devon Allman’s Honeytribe, Bobby Lee Rodgers Trio, Soul Rebel's Brass Band, Guitar Shorty, Dangermuffin, Honey Island Swamp Band, Kevin Hammond, Death on Two Wheels, The Yeti Trio, Jacob Jeffries Band and Griffin Anthony

=== 2012 ===
The 2012 event was held April 19–21 and included Furthur, Trigger Hippy, Gov't Mule, Tedeschi Trucks Band, Buddy Guy, Allman Brothers Band, Jaimoe’s Jasssz Band, Buddy Guy, Bruce Hornsby and Mickey Hart Band, Hot Tuna Electric, Ray Manzarek & Roy Rogers Band, Leftover Salmon, North Mississippi Allstars, Trigger Hippy(Joan Osborne, Jackie Greene, Steve Gorman, Audley Freed, Nick Govrik), SOJA, Conspirator, Eoto, Ivan Neville’s Dumpstaphunk, Particle, Devon Allman’s Honeytribe, Zach Deputy, Matt Schofield, Bobby Lee Rodgers Trio, Big Sams Funky Nation, Charles Bradley, Bonerama, Jacob Jeffries Band, The Yeti Trio and Bonnie Blue.

=== 2013 ===
The 2013 event was held April 18–20 and included such musical guests as Widespread Panic, Allman Brothers, Gov't Mule, Tedeschi Trucks Band and Jaimoe's Jasssz Band, Dirty Dozen Brass Band, Michael Franti & Spearhead, Robert Randolph and the Family Band, Leon Russell, Tower of Power, Les Claypool’s Duo de Twang, Electric Hot Tuna, Maceo Parker, Steel Pulse, North Mississippi Allstars, Blackberry Smoke, Galactic & Friends, The Greyboy Allstars, Voice of the Wetlands All-Stars Featuring: Tab Benoit, Cyril Neville, Big Chief Monk Boudreaux, Jumpin Johnny Sansone, Waylon Thibodeaux, Johnny Vidacovich, Dirty Dozen Braass Band, Royal Southern Brotherhood, Bobby Lee Rodgers Trio, The Lee Boys, Giant Panda Guerilla Dub Squad, The Revivalists, Beebs and her Money Makers and Monophonics.

=== 2014 ===
The 2014 event, held April 10–12, featured guests Allman BrothersLynyrd Skynyrd, Trey Anastasio Band, Tedeschi Trucks Band, Gov't Mule, Jaimoe's Jasssz Band, Umphrey's McGee, Ziggy Marley, Blues Traveler, Chris Robinson Brotherhood, Hot Tuna Electric, Moe., Rusted Root, Ivan Neville's Dumpstaphunk (Music of Led Zeppelin), Soulive, Royal Southern Brotherhood, Walter Trout, Rob Garza (of Thievery Corporation), Blind Boys of Alabama, Bobby Lee Rodgers Trio, Melvin Seals & JGB, Futurebirds, Matt Schofield, Break Science, Sean Chambers and The Yeti Trio.

=== 2015 ===
The 2015 event, the first since the retirement of the Allman Brothers Band, held April 16–18 and featured Widespread Panic, Gregg Allman, Gov't Mule, Earth, Wind & Fire, JJ Grey & Mofro, Cheap Trick, Jaimoe's Jasssz Band, Butch Trucks and Zappa Plays Zappa, Galactic, Hot Tuna Electric, Yonder Mountain String Band, Leftover Salmon, Dumpstaphunk, The Word, Raw Oyster Cult, Dragon Smoke, The Revivalists, Home at Last, Pink Talking Fish, Royal Southern Brotherhood, Juke

=== 2016 ===
The 2016 event, was held April 14–16, featuring Widespread Panic, Gregg Allman, Gov't Mule, Les Brers featuring Butch Trucks and Jaimoe, Jaimoe's Jasssz Band, Warren Haynes and The Ashes & Dust Band, Billy & the Kids, Umphrey's Mcgee, Hot Tuna Electric with Steve Kimock, Bruce Hornsby and The Noise Makers, North Mississippi Allstars and Anders Osborne present NMO, Melvin Seals and JGB with special guest Karl Denson, Conspirator, Soulive, The Wood Brothers, The Stanley Clarke Band, Oteil Burbridge and Friends, Tribal Seeds, Dumpstaphunk's Earth War & Power, Madisen Ward and the Mama Bear, Bobby Lee Rodgers Trio, Kung Fu, Nigel Hall, Devon Allman Band with guest Ben Sparaco, Big Something, The Yeti Trio

=== 2017 ===
The 2017 event, was held April 20–22, featuring Widespread Panic, Bob Weir and the Campfire Band (2 days), Trey Anastasio Band, Gov't Mule, Dark Star Orchestra (2 Sets on 4/20), Dr. John & The Nite Trippers, JJ Grey & Mofro, Les Brers, Jaimoe’s Jasssz Band, Leftover Salmon Performing The Music Of Neil Young, The Greyboy Allstars, Blackberry Smoke, Matisyahu, Keller Williams’ Grateful Grass, Papadosio, Turkuaz, Pink Talking Fu – Music Of David Bowie & Prince DJ Logic, Kung Fu, Pink Talking Fish, Bobby Lee Rodgers Trio, Devon Allman Band, The Marcus King Band, The Yeti Trio, Brothers & Sisters Band. Wanee Wednesday featured a tribute to Butch Trucks with The Freight Train Band feat Luther & Cody Dickinson, New Orleans Suspects, Crazy Fingers, Ben Sparaco, Matt Reynolds and Brothers and Sisters.

=== 2018 ===
The 2018 festival, which is set for April 19–21 at the Spirit of the Suwannee Music Park, featured two nights of Widespread Panic and Phil Lesh & The Terrapin Family Band. Other bands announced include As the Crow Flies, Dark Star Orchestra (Thursday on the Peach Stage), St. Paul & The Broken Bones, Jaimoe's Jasssz Band, The Chris Robinson Brotherhood, North Mississippi All Stars, Karl Denson's Tiny Universe (Eat A Bunch of Peaches featuring George Porter Jr. & Marc Quinones), Pigeons Playing Ping Pong, Walter Trout, Sonny Landreth, The Marcus King Band, George Porter Jr. & Runnin’ Pardners), Pink Talking Fish (Tied To The Whipping Post), Soul Rebels, Les Bros, Bobby Lee Rodgers Trio, The Main Squeeze, Big Something, New Orleans Suspects, Berry Oakley's Indigenous Suspects, Midnight North, The Yeti Trio and Crazy Fingers.

=== 2019 ===
In November 2018, Live Nation announced that they would not hold a Wanee Music Festival in 2019. No additional plans have been made to continue the music festival.

== See also ==
- List of jam band music festivals
