= The Word (album) =

Studio album by The Word
- Released: July 31, 2001
- Genre: Instrumental rock, Sacred steel, gospel blues, jam rock, blues rock, jazz fusion, Southern rock
- Length: 44:08
- Label: Ropeadope Records
- Producer: Scotty Hard, John Medeski

The Word is the debut album by an instrumental jam band supergroup The Word. The musicians: Robert Randolph (pedal steel guitar), John Medeski (keyboards), and the three members of North Mississippi Allstars - Luther Dickinson (electric guitar), Cody Dickinson (drums, washboard), and Chris Chew (bass guitar).

Professional ratings
Review scores
| Source | Rating |
|---|---|
| Allmusic | link |

== Track listing ==
1. "Joyful Sounds" – 3:45
2. "Call Him by His Name" – 4:11
3. "Blood on that Rock" – 3:22
4. "Without God" – 6:51
5. "Waiting on My Wings" – 8:19
6. "At the Cross" – 2:40
7. "I'll Fly Away" – 7:19
8. "I Shall Not Be Moved" – 2:37
9. "Keep Your Lamp Trimmed and Burning" – 2:02
10. "Untitled" – 6:08
11. "Joyful Sounds Reprise" - 0:49 (This track is hidden, or unlisted, on the original CD release.)

== Contributing Artists ==
John Medeski, Robert Randolph, North Mississippi Allstars
