= Music of Fame (2009 film) =

Fame is a 2009 American musical drama film and a loose remake of the 1980 film of the same name. The film's music accompanied American standards and new pieces, written specifically for the film. The original soundtrack to the film was first released for promoting the film, along with an extended play of remixes of the title track. An additional soundtrack which features dialogs, karaoke versions of selected tracks and performances that were not included in the first soundtrack music followed the film, along with two solo albums from Naturi Naughton and Collins Pennie.

== Fame (Original Motion Picture Soundtrack) ==
Fame (Original Motion Picture Soundtrack)

Soundtrack album by various artists
- Released: September 7, 2009
- Genre: Disco; pop; gospel; orchestral; rock; classical rock; indie rock; alternative rock; punk
- Length: 60:51
- Label: Lakeshore Records

Fame (Original Motion Picture Soundtrack) is the soundtrack to the film, released by Lakeshore Records on September 7, 2009. It featured vocal performances from the cast members, notably Raney Shockne, Naturi Naughton, Anjulie, Asher Book, Collins Pennie, Kay Panabaker, Megan Mullally, Rachael Sage amongst several others.

Heather Phares of AllMusic wrote "the soundtrack to the 2009 remake of Fame isn't a strict reworking of the 1980 musical's songs — along with adding new songs and standards, it also includes pop songs, making it a strange hybrid of musical soundtrack, Broadway revue, and a soundtrack to films like Step Up and Stomp the Yard. Only a few of the original musical's songs survived the retooling." He concluded "At times, this Fame feels like it's trying to be all things to all audiences, but it still manages to be a crowd-pleaser."

Track listing
No.	Title	Artist(s)/Performer(s)	Length
1.	"Welcome To P.A."	Raney Shockne	0:53
2.	"Fame"	Naturi Naughton	3:26
3.	"Big Things"	Anjulie	2:52
4.	"Ordinary People"	Asher Book	4:16
5.	"This Is My Life"	Hopsin, Ak'Sent, Tynisha Keli and Donte "Burger" Winston	3:23
6.	"Out Here on My Own"	Naturi Naughton	3:23
7.	"Street Hustlin'"	Raney Shockne feat. Stella Moon	1:24
8.	"You'll Find A Way" (Switch & Sinden Remix)	Santigold	3:13
9.	"Can't Hide From Love"	Naturi Naughton and Collins Pennie	3:41
10.	"Black & Gold"	Sam Sparro	3:31
11.	"Back To Back"	Collins Pennie feat. Ashleigh Haney	2:57
12.	"I Put a Spell on You"	Raney Shockne feat. Eddie Wakes	2:28
13.	"Get On The Floor"	Naturi Naughton and Collins Pennie	3:48
14.	"Try"	Asher Book	3:27
15.	"You Took Advantage of Me"	Megan Mullally	3:16
16.	"Too Many Women" (Damon Elliott Remix)	Rachael Sage	2:59
17.	"Someone To Watch Over Me"	Asher Book	3:21
18.	"You Made Me Love You"	Raney Shockne feat. Oren Waters	2:57
19.	"Hold Your Dream"	Naturi Naughton, Asher Book and Kay Panabaker	5:36
Total length:			60:51

=== Charts ===
Chart (2009)	Peak position
Australian Albums (ARIA)	59
Austrian Albums (Ö3 Austria)	43
Belgian Albums (Ultratop Flanders)	47
French Albums (SNEP)	54
German Albums (Offizielle Top 100)	79
New Zealand Albums (RMNZ)	23
Swiss Albums (Schweizer Hitparade)	24
UK Compilation Albums (OCC)	12
US Billboard 200	43
US Independent Albums (Billboard)	5
US Current Album Sales (Billboard)	43
US Soundtrack Albums (Billboard)	2

== Fame (More Music from the Motion Picture) ==
Fame (More Music from the Motion Picture)

Soundtrack album by various artists
- Released: November 9, 2009
- Genre: Disco; pop; gospel; rock; punk; acoustic; indie rock; alternative rock; classical rock; orchestral; instrumental; jazz
- Length: 36:40
- Label: Lakeshore Records

Fame (More Music from the Motion Picture) is the soundtrack featuring additional tracks, dialogues, and songs that were not included in the soundtrack. It was released on November 9, 2009.

No.	Title	Artist(s)/Performer(s)	Length
1.	"This Year" (Dialog)	Debbie Allen	0:12
2.	"Fame" (T Blade Hip-Hop Remix)	Naturi Naughton	3:38
3.	"Why Do You Keep Trying?" (Dialog)	Asher Book and Kay Panabaker	0:21
4.	"Try" (Radio Mix)	Asher Book	3:38
5.	"The-Boyz-N-The-Hood" (Dialog)	Anna Maria Perez de Tagle and Paul Iocano	0:20
6.	"I Want Candy"	Anna Maria Perez de Tagle	2:44
7.	"That's Your Power" (Dialog)	Charles S. Dutton	0:21
8.	"Hold Your Dream" (Acoustic)	Naturi Naughton	3:58
9.	"Drum Beat Dance"	Raney Shockne feat. J.T. Horenstein and Kristy Flores	0:26
10.	"Fly Me to the Moon"	Asher Book	2:33
11.	"I Have An Idea" (Dialog)	Paul Iocano	0:20
12.	"What A Mighty God We Serve"	Pasadena Community College Gospel Choir	1:45
13.	"Success Is Not" (Dialog)	Kay Panabaker	0:17
14.	"Gravity"	Asher Book	3:49
15.	"Habanera"	Hailey Villaire	0:40
16.	"You Might Make A Wonderful Teacher" (Dialog)	Bebe Neuwirth	0:19
17.	"Dust"	James Grundler	3:33
18.	"Everything I Ever Hoped For" (Dialog)	Paul Iocano	0:17
19.	"Fame" (Karaoke)	—	3:20
20.	"Out Here On My Own" (Karaoke)	—	3:19
21.	"All That Jazz"	Patrick Censoplano	0:50
Total length:			36:40

== Fame (Radio Mixes) ==
Fame (Radio Mixes)

EP by various artists
- Released: September 21, 2009
- Genre: Remix
- Length: 36:40
- Label: Lakeshore Records

Fame (Radio Mixes) is the extended play containing the rendition of "Fame" by Naturi Naughton that had been re-mixed several times. It was released on September 21, 2009

No.	Title	Artist(s)/Performer(s)	Length
1.	"Fame" (Radio Mix)	Naturi Naughton	3:25
2.	"Fame" (Video Mix)	Naturi Naughton, Collins Pennie	3:26
3.	"Fame" (Chris Cox Remix Radio Edit)	Naturi Naughton	3:47
4.	"Fame" (Bimbo Jones Remix Radio Edit)	Naturi Naughton	3:18
5.	"Fame" (Oakenfold Remix Radio Edit)	Naturi Naughton	3:31
Total length:			17:27

== Solo albums ==
=== Fame Presents Naturi Naughton as Denise: Didn't I Tell You? ===
Fame Presents Naturi Naughton as Denise: Didn't I Tell You?

Studio album by Naturi Naughton
- Released: February 15, 2010
- Genre: Pop; rock; jazz
- Length: 34:01
- Label: Lakeshore Records

A solo studio album for Naturi Naughton, entitled Fame Presents Naturi Naughton as Denise: Didn't I Tell You? was released on February 15, 2010.

No.	Title	Length
1.	"Hello World (Intro)"	0:27
2.	"Didn't I Tell You"	3:19
3.	"Change"	4:14
4.	"Invade Me"	3:35
5.	"Miss-Behave"	3:09
6.	"Keep Up With Me"	2:56
7.	"Stingy"	2:24
8.	"Looks Just Like You"	4:30
9.	"On My Way"	2:51
10.	"H8AZ"	3:31
11.	"Can't Hold Me Down"	3:07
Total length:		34:01

=== Fame Presents Collins Pennie as Malik: Best Believe That ===
Fame Presents Collins Pennie as Malik: Best Believe That

Studio album by Collins Pennie
- Released: March 5, 2012
- Genre: Pop; rock; jazz
- Length: 28:40
- Label: Lakeshore Records

Another studio album for Collins Pennie, titled Fame Presents Collins Pennie as Malik: Best Believe That was released on March 5, 2012.

No.	Title	Length
1.	"Best Believe That"	3:52
2.	"Ex Means Next"	2:50
3.	"Save Yourself"	3:30
4.	"Man Down"	3:55
5.	"Man on Fire"	3:36
6.	"Bad News"	3:29
7.	"Fire Rain"	3:44
8.	"Blame it on Love"	3:39
Total length:		28:40
