= Ron Holloway =

American tenor saxophonist

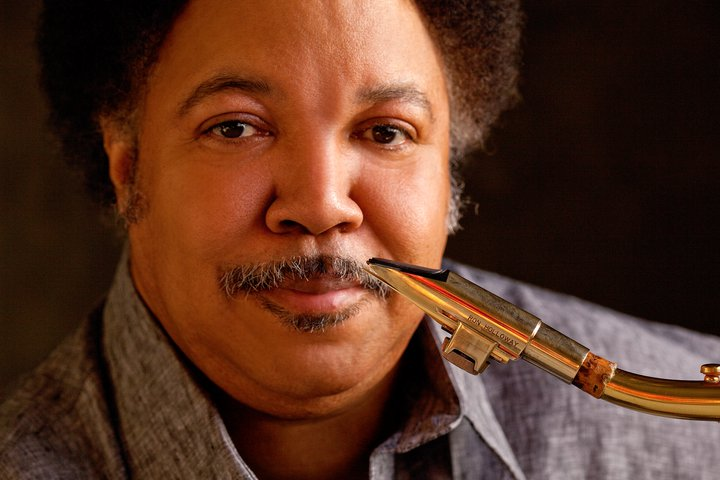
- Tenor saxophonist Ron Holloway during a tour of Russia

Background information
- Born: Ronald Edward Holloway; August 24, 1953 (age 73); Washington, D.C., U.S.
- Genres: Jazz, R&B, blues, funk, rock
- Occupation: Musician
- Instrument: Tenor saxophone
- Years active: 1966–present
- Label: Fantasy/Milestone
- Website: theronhollowayband.com

Ronald Edward Holloway (born August 24, 1953) is an American tenor saxophonist. He is listed in the Biographical Encyclopedia of Jazz where veteran jazz critic Ira Gitler described Holloway as a "Hard bear-down-hard-bopper who can blow authentic R&B and croon a ballad with warm, blue feeling."

Holloway is the recipient of 42 Washington Area Music Awards, or Wammies, two of which he received as musician of the year.

He has been a member of the Warren Haynes Band, Susan Tedeschi, Dizzy Gillespie, Gil Scott-Heron and Root Boy Slim. Since 2014, Ron Holloway has led his own band; The Ron Holloway Band.

== Biography ==
=== Early years and influences ===
Ron Holloway was born to Winston and Marjorie Holloway, avid jazz fans who met while attending Howard University in Washington, D.C. Holloway recalls his father adding to his collection of Prestige and Blue Note jazz albums. Holloway's parents, while not musicians, provided a nurturing musical environment for their son. Holloway's father favored the saxophone and trumpet-led albums and particularly enjoyed great horn soloists. R&B-influenced Willis Gator Jackson was easiest to grasp at first, but soon he identified the sounds of Sonny Rollins, John Coltrane, and Miles Davis as his principal influences.

After high school graduation, Holloway practiced 8–12 hours a day and sat in with bands of kinds in jam sessions, which increased his versatility. He became familiar with many genres. In the same week he would often perform with groups in jazz, R&B, funk, rock, jazz fusion, blues, country, and folk.

As the Washington D.C. music scene continued to thrive in the 1970s, Holloway joined popular R&B groups the Sounds of Shea and Mad Dog and the Lowlifers.

In 1974, Holloway went to see Freddie Hubbard in concert and brought an audio cassette tape he'd made while rehearsing to one of Hubbard's recordings. During the intermission he introduced himself and played the tape for Hubbard. After hearing the tape, Hubbard invited Holloway to come back and play with him that Sunday night. He did so and at the end of the performance Hubbard extended an open invitation to sit in with him whenever Hubbard was in town.

The next year, Sonny Rollins conducted a clinic at Howard University. Backed by a rhythm section composed of local musicians, Rollins invited the young horn players onstage. Holloway joined him on Rollins's "Playin' in the Yard". After his solo, Holloway received a standing ovation from the audience. Rollins and Holloway remained in touch afterwards, becoming good friends. The friendship and respect between the two ran both ways. Rollins has been equally generous in his praise of Holloway over the years and has mentioned him in several interviews as one of his favorite young tenor players.

Holloway admired Rollins' "....sense of organic construction, ambidextrous timing, humorous quotes, supreme swagger, infectious personality, individual choice of notes, note displacement, keen sense of drama, staccato punctuations followed by virtuosic runs, worrying a single note, a very personal tonal texture, unique use of smeared notes and more."

In the summer of 1977 a new club opened and the performers included Rollins, Hubbard and Dizzy Gillespie. Holloway approached Gillespie's dressing room and as he had done with Rollins, brought a tape with him- this time of his performance with Rollins. After Gillespie listened to the tape, he asked Holloway if he had brought his horn, to which Holloway confessed he hadn't because he was concerned about appearing presumptuous. Holloway found himself performing with Gillespie all week. Afterwards, he had a standing invitation to sit in with the band.

In 1979 Holloway sat in with Dizzy Gillespie at Ronnie Scott's Jazz Club in London, England. Holloway continued to sit in with Gillespie well into the 1980s. On June 6, 1987, he performed with a large group of musicians honoring Gillespie at Wolf Trap National Park for the Performing Arts.

=== Root Boy Slim and the Sex Change Band ===
In 1979 Root Boy, Holloway and the rest of the Sex Change Band participated in a film entitled Mr. Mike's Mondo Video which was written by Michael O'Donoghue of Saturday Night Live. Mondo Video was not broadcast as NBC deemed it "sick" while Spin later referred to it as "A TV pilot too dangerous to air."

In the early 1980s, Root Boy and Holloway made cameo appearances in a film made by the D.C. area comedy group known as The Langley Punks, for their Travesty Films group. Holloway recorded four albums with Root Boy and at least three 45's: "Too Much Jawbone" with "Xmas at K-Mart" on the flip side, "The Meltdown" backed with "Graveyard of Losers" and "Dare to Be Fat" on I.R.S. Records. Holloway was a member of several Root Boy configurations from 1977 to 1987.

Holloway's tenure with Root Boy Slim overlapped with two other groups. The first was a local funk band called Osiris. Holloway first met Osiris Marsh in 1979 and found their influences included bands with eclectic tastes ranging from Parliament-Funkadelic, Earth, Wind, and Fire, and Sly and the Family Stone. In addition, Osiris was interested in the culture of ancient Egypt and African American roots music. The members of Osiris were Osiris Marsh on lead vocals, Tony Jones and Tyrone "Ty" Brunson on bass guitars, Maceo Bond on keyboards, Brent Mingle on guitar, Jimmy "Sha-Sha" Stapleton on percussion and Holloway on tenor and soprano saxophones.

Marsh, who wrote or co-wrote the majority of the band's songs with Bond and Brunson, produced an independent studio album on the band's own label, Tomdog, titled Since Before Our Time in 1978. In 1979, Warner Bros. Records picked it up, remixed and repackaged it. Another album, O-Zone on Marlin Records, met with similar reviews and faced the same overall inability to overcome the dance floor fever that enticed many funk and soul listeners towards disco as the 1970s came to an end. Holloway played with Osiris from 1979 to 1981.

=== Gil Scott-Heron ===
In November 1981 Holloway visited a landmark D.C. club; Blues Alley, where he had been told jazz drummer Norman Connors would be performing. He brought his horn and upon arriving spotted Connors and introduced himself. With an invitation from Connors, he sat in on the next set, getting a good response from the audience. Afterward, Holloway was approached by singer and spoken word artist, Gil Scott-Heron, who complimented him and extended an offer to join his group, the "Amnesia Express". In February 1982 Holloway played his first concert with Scott-Heron at The Bottom Line in New York City with fellow saxophonist and Amnesia Express co-founder Carl Cornwell. The press appreciated his contributions as well, commenting on his performance in several reviews. It happened that, early in 1982, Holloway was on board when filmmaker Robert Mugge documented Scott-Heron's concert at the Wax Museum nightclub in Washington, D.C. The film is called Black Wax. Holloway found his playing evolving while in the band, commenting, "I got so many things together on my horn while playing with Gil. It was really a valuable period of self discovery." Holloway was a member of Scott-Heron's group from February 1982 until June 1989.

=== Dizzy Gillespie ===
Though he was a member of Scott-Heron's group during this period, Holloway continued to appear with Gillespie whenever he would perform in D.C. In June 1989 he was sitting in with Dizzy at Blues Alley. During the intermission, Gillespie sent his manager to find Holloway. Gillespie surprised Holloway with the statement he was in need of a sax player. Holloway accepted and found himself touring the world with Gillespie, performing for audiences that varied from club capacity to popular American television shows which included the Johnny Carson and Arsenio Hall shows. During his time with Gillespie, Holloway recorded two albums with the trumpeter; The Symphony Sessions on Pro Arte and Dizzy Gillespie – Live! at Blues Alley on the Blues Alley label. He also played the top jazz and music festivals theaters, and concert halls around the world with Gillespie. Holloway was a member of Gillespie's quintet from June 1989 until his death on January 6, 1993.

=== Solo recording ===
In the fall of 1993, Holloway recorded an album and sent the demo to his mentor, Sonny Rollins. Rollins, then forwarded the recording to Fantasy Records and Holloway was signed to Milestone Records, one of Fantasy's subsidiary labels, within a week's time. To date, Holloway has released four albums on Fantasy's Milestone Records label and another on the Jazzmont label.

=== The Ron Holloway Band (RHB) ===
In 2015, Holloway formed The Ron Holloway Band, a funk jam band centered around Holloway's multi-female vocals and Holloway's sax playing. The band debuted at the 2014 Mad Tea Party in Hedgesville, West Virginia, and shortly after performed at The Peach Music Festival in Scranton, PA. RHB was joined by surprise special guests Warren Haynes and Derek Trucks at Peach, the first of many concert sit-ins from members of The Allman Brothers Band, Gov't Mule, and Tedeschi Trucks Band.

Members of The Ron Holloway Band have included Jenny Langer (vocals), Rodney Dunton (drums), Christopher Brown (bass), Rachel Ann Morgan (vocals), Justin Gillen (guitar), Cory Belcher, Cody Wright, Wes Lanich (keys), Rod Gross (drums), Amanda Lynne (vocals), Barry Sherrard (drums), Noah Pierre (bass), Joe Poppen (guitar), and Barry Hart (drums).

== 2000 to 2019 ==
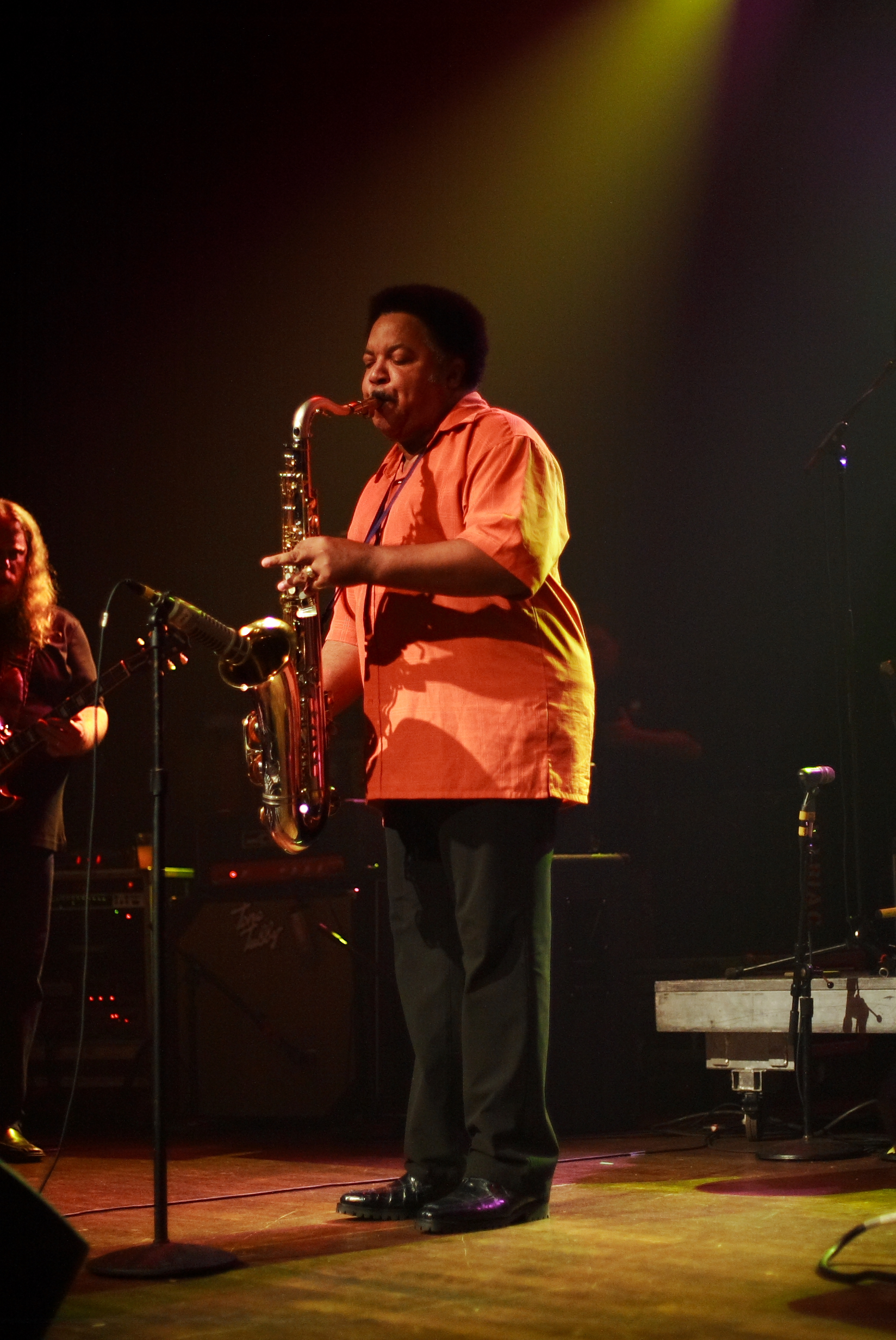
Holloway playing with Gov't Mule, at The Grand in Wilmington, DE, 2008

Holloway met Derek Trucks in 2002 aboard Trucks' tour bus just outside the entrance to Rams Head Onstage, in Annapolis, Maryland. Trucks surprised him with his vast knowledge of various musical genres. Holloway has since performed with Trucks many times as a guest of The Derek Trucks Band and The Allman Brothers Band, toured with both the Susan Tedeschi Band (of which Holloway was a member) and the band co-led by Trucks and Tedeschi for a couple of summers, "Soul Stew Revival".

On September 30, 2004, Little Feat were scheduled to open for the Allman Brothers Band at Nissan Pavilion in Bristow, Virginia. Holloway was to accompany Little Feat. Aside from Little Feat, Holloway found himself in the company of the two featured guitarists in The Allman Brothers Band. This was the first time he had heard the band with its current lineup. Warren Haynes invited Holloway to sit in with the band and at the close of the concert, he performed on one of the classic tunes made famous by the band; "Southbound". Haynes invited Holloway to appear with Gov't Mule afterward at the 9:30 Club in Washington, D.C., and they performed two consecutive nights on October 27 and 28, 2004 before a packed house, recording both nights. The next year, in the summer of 2005, guitarist Jack Pearson and Holloway toured with The Allman Brothers Band, filling in for an ailing Warren Haynes. It was the beginning of many performances where Holloway appeared with The Allman Brothers Band and Gov't Mule, playing the Beacon Theatre in New York City, Nissan Pavilion in Bristow, Virginia, the Wanee Festival in Live Oak, Florida, Merriweather Post Pavilion in Columbia, Maryland, Warner Theatre (Washington, D.C.) and The Warren Haynes Christmas Jam, which Haynes hosts annually, in Asheville, North Carolina.

In January 2010, Gov't Mule hosted their first "Gov't Mule Island Exodus" in the same resort in Negril, Jamaica that Holloway had visited with Little Feat. Over the course of the four nights, Gov't Mule performed three evening concerts, Grace Potter and the Nocturnals played three shows and Warren Haynes played a solo set. Guesting throughout were DJ Logic (turntables), "Mean" Willie Green (drums) and Holloway (tenor sax).

=== Susan Tedeschi ===
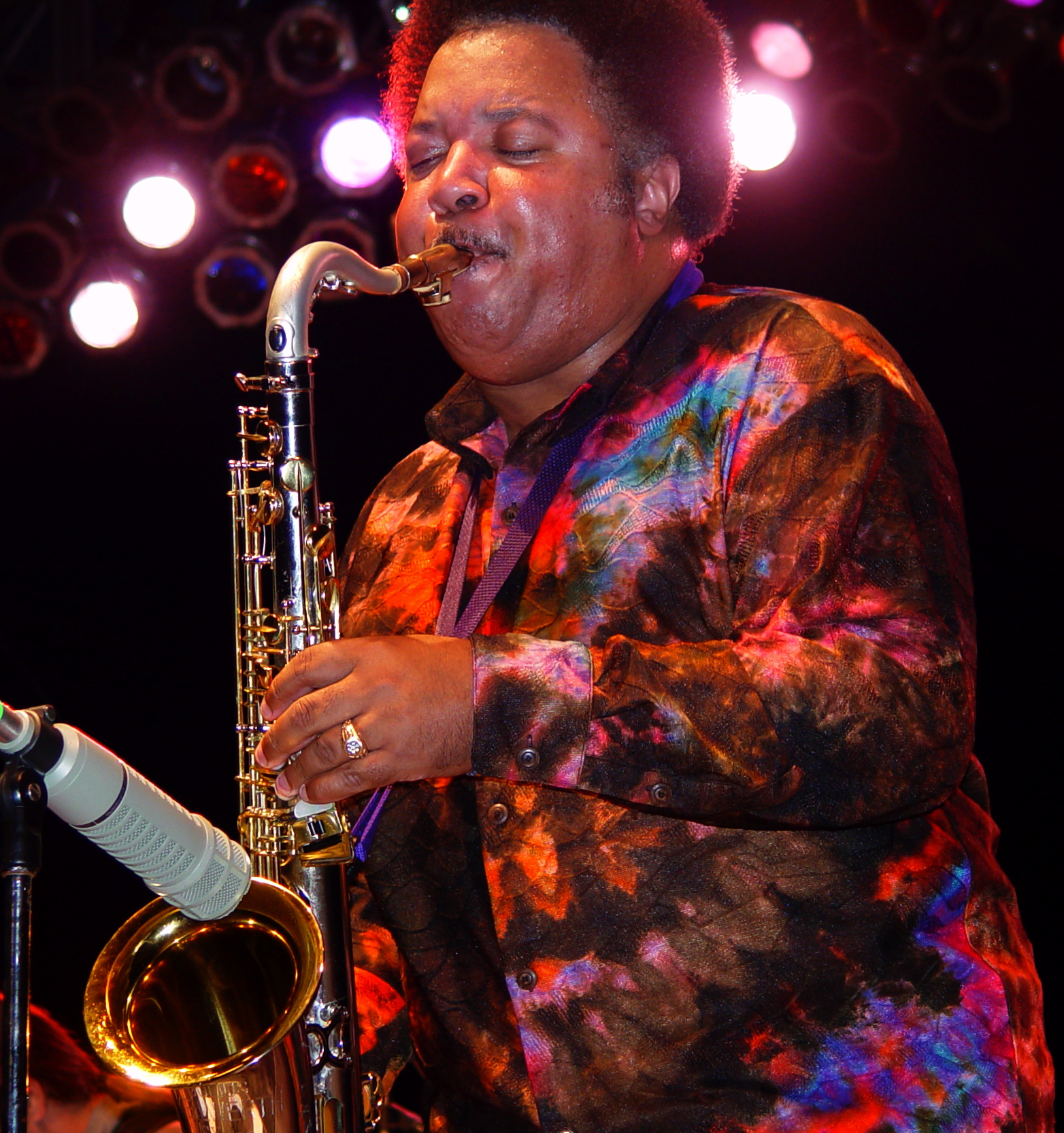
Holloway in 2007 With Derek Trucks and Susan Tedeschi's Soul Stew Revival

In October 2005 Holloway finally heard blues and soul singer, Susan Tedeschi perform with her own group at Rams Head Live! in Baltimore, Maryland. Tedeschi and Holloway met previously a couple of years before while guesting with her husband, Derek Trucks, at the Wanee Festival and a show at The Birchmere, (in suburban Virginia, just outside Washington, D.C.). After renewing their acquaintance and performing that night, Tedeschi invited Holloway to join her band. For the next few years, the band toured across Europe and extensively throughout the United States, playing major festivals, concert halls, theaters and clubs. Tedeschi, along with her band have also appeared on Late Night with Conan O'Brien and have been seen on countless local news spots as they toured across the United States. Along with the airplay her recordings receive, Tedeschi has performed live many times on radio stations across the country, including NPR. Holloway was a member of Tedeschi's band for four years.

=== Warren Haynes ===
In February 2009, Warren Haynes began work on a solo project at Pedernales Studio, in Austin, Texas, with Gordie Johnson as co-producer and engineer. The recording featured George Porter Jr. on electric bass, Ivan Neville on keyboards, Raymond Weber on drums, Ian McLagan on additional keyboards, Ruthie Foster on vocals and Holloway on tenor saxophone. The resulting album, Man in Motion, was released on May 10, 2011, on the Stax/Concord Music Group label.

The debut of The Warren Haynes Band took place during the 22nd Annual Warren Haynes Christmas Jam, which was held at the Asheville Civic Center in Asheville, North Carolina on Saturday, December 11, 2010. The group line-up was; Warren Haynes (lead vocals/guitar), Ivan Neville (keys/vocals), Ron Johnson (electric bass), Terence Higgins (drums), Ruthie Foster (vocals) and Holloway (tenor saxophone). After the release of Man in Motion, Holloway joined Haynes, Higgins, Johnson, and keyboardist Nigel Hall for an extensive tour.

=== Devon Allman ===
Having been introduced to Gregg Allman while playing with The Allman Brothers Band, Holloway encountered his son, Devon Allman at the Iota Club & Cafe in Arlington, Virginia, on March 31, 2009, when Devon's band Honeytribe performed there. Allman contacted Holloway when his band, Honeytribe were preparing to record their second album and had need of a saxophone player. Holloway traveled to Memphis, Tennessee, and spent two days recording with the band at Ardent Studios for Honeytribe's sophomore release; Space Age Blues. The CD was released in October 2010 to positive reviews.

== 2023 ==
Summer 2023, played with Gov't Mule during Dark Side of the Mule tour

== Discography ==
=== As leader ===
Year	Album	Label
1994	Slanted	Fantasy/Milestone
1995	Struttin	Fantasy/Milestone
1996	Scorcher	Fantasy/Milestone
1998	Groove Update	Fantasy/Milestone
2003	Ron Holloway & Friends Live at Montpelier	JazzMont

=== With Dizzy Gillespie ===
Year	Album	Label
1989	The Symphony Sessions	Pro Arte
1990	Dizzy Gillespie Live! at Blues Alley	Blues Alley Music Society

=== With Warren Haynes ===
Year	Album	Label
2011	Man in Motion	Stax / Concord Music Group
