= The Warren Haynes Christmas Jam =

Music marathon

Coordinates: 35.5973°N 82.5555°W

The Warren Haynes Christmas Jam is a one-of-a-kind music marathon curated and presented by Grammy Award-winning vocalist-songwriter and guitarist Warren Haynes. Since its inception in 1988, the concert has provided an opportunity for the performing artists, audience and the local community to give back during the holiday season. Over the past 18 years, Haynes - an Asheville native - has worked closely with the Asheville Area Habitat for Humanity.

The first show was dubbed, "The Christmas Jam: Musician's X-Mas Reunion" and was held at 45 Cherry, a local club in Asheville, on December 22, 1988. This event has continued to grow every year and is now dubbed "Warren Haynes Presents: The Christmas Jam". The show sells out in a matter of hours every year. Because of the fantastic growth, it is currently held at the U.S. Cellular Center (formerly known as the Asheville Civic Center), and continues to feature artists and friends Haynes has played with over the years including The Allman Brothers Band, The Avett Brothers, The Doobie Brothers, Sheryl Crow, Peter Frampton, John Paul Jones, Ray LaMontagne, Steve Miller Band, Tedeschi Trucks Band, and many more.

== Charity ==
Initially, the charities benefiting from the Christmas Jam varied from the Vietnam Veterans of America Foundation, AIDS charities, and homeless relief groups among others. Haynes settled on Habitat for Humanity in 1988. For the past 18 years, proceeds from the Jam have gone toward constructing energy-efficient new houses (33 houses have been built to date with 25 more on the way) as well as purchasing and developing land for entire Habitat subdivisions. The Jam recently handed over a record-breaking half-million dollars, marking one of the largest-ever contributions to the organization.

== Christmas Jam by Day ==
In addition to the main event, there will be numerous daytime activities for guests to take in. "Xmas Jam by Day" concerts will take over venues throughout Asheville and feature special collaborations alongside some of the best local musicians and the annual art show will feature some of the best photography and poster-art in music.

== Before the Jam, Lend a Hand ==
"Before the Jam, Lend a Hand" is a signature volunteer event with Asheville Area Habitat that happens in the days leading up to the Christmas Jam. Since 2007, volunteers have been enjoying the camaraderie of working alongside other fans as they support the cause that the Jam supports - in a hands on way.

== Past lineups ==
=== 2018 ===
U.S. Cellular Center

Night 1 (Friday, December 7, 2018) Dark Side of the Mule, Grace Potter, Jamey Johnson, Marco Benevento, Mike Gordon

Night 2 (Saturday, December 8, 2018) Dave Grohl and Friends Play “Play,” Eric Church, Gov’t Mule, Jim James, Joe Bonamassa

=== 2017 ===
U.S. Cellular Center (Saturday, December 9, 2017)

Gov't Mule w/ Ann Wilson, Trey Anastasio & Classic TAB, The Avett Brothers, Les Bros, Blackberry Smoke, Margo Price, Jake Shimabukuro.

=== 2016 ===
U.S. Cellular Center (Saturday, December 10, 2016)

Featuring: Gov't Mule, Bob Weir, Michael McDonald, Alison Krauss & Jamey Johnson, The Last Waltz Band (Warren Haynes, Michael McDonald, Don Was, Jamey Johnson, John Medeski and more)

=== 2015 ===
U.S. Cellular Center (Saturday, December 12, 2015)

Featuring: Warren Haynes Ashes & Dust, Tedeschi Trucks Band, The Doobie Brothers, Electric Hot Tuna, Dawes, Blackberry Smoke, Bruce Hornsby.

=== 2014 ===
U.S. Cellular Center (Saturday, December 13, 2014)

Featuring: Gov't Mule, Jason Isbell, Billy & the Kids, Hard Working Americans, The Revivalists, and more. Vince Gill was on the original line-up, but could not make it due to the passing of his long-time backup singer.

=== 2013 ===
Asheville Civic Center (Friday, December 13, 2013 & Saturday, December 14, 2013)

For the 25th Anniversary, The Xmas Jam format expanded to two nights.

Night 1: Friday, December 13, 2013

Featuring: Warren Haynes & Ray Sisk, Gov't Mule, Love Canon, Keb' Mo', John Scofield and the Uberjam Band, Gregg Allman, Phil Lesh Quintet, Widespread Panic

Special Guests: Ike Stubblefield, Randall Bramblett, Birdland, Jay Bowman, Ron Holloway, Ron Johnson, Casey Driessen, Jeff Sipe, Ike Stubblefield

Night 2: Saturday, December 14, 2013

Featuring: Aquarium Rescue Unit, O.A.R., Michael Franti & Friends, Gregg Allman & Friends, Grace Potter & The Nocturnals, Gov't Mule, Xmas Jam Band

Special Guests: Craig Sorrells, Bill Evans, Roosevelt Collier, Casey Driessen, Mike Seal, Dr. Dan Matrazzo, Billy Thornton, Ron Holloway, Mike Barnes, Ron Johnson, Jeff Sipe, Audley Freed, Count M'butu, John Scofield

=== 2012 ===
Asheville Civic Center (Saturday, December 15, 2012)

Featuring: Warren Haynes, The Blind Boys of Alabama, Trombone Shorty & Orleans Avenue, The Avett Brothers, Sheryl Crow, The String Cheese Incident, Warren Haynes Band

Special Guests: Nigel Hall, Karl Denson, Ron Holloway, Terrence Higgins, Anders Osborne, Count M’Butu, Rob Ingraham, David Shaw, Ed Williams, Zack Feinberg, Dr. Dan Matrazzo, Mike Barnes, Artimus Pyle

=== 2011 ===
Asheville Civic Center (Saturday, December 10, 2011)

Featuring: Gov't Mule, Phil Lesh & Friends, Los Lobos, Bela Fleck

Special Guests: Mike Barnes, Jeff Chimenti, Bill Evans, Audley Freed, Jackie Greene, Jimmy Herring, Robert Kearns, Kevn Kinney, Brad Pemberton, Joe Russo, Jeff Sipe

=== 2010 ===
Asheville Civic Center (Saturday, December 11, 2010)

Featuring: Steve Miller Band, The Warren Haynes Band, Gregg Allman, John Bell (Widespread Panic), Umphrey's McGee, Dirty Dozen Brass Band, Missing Cats

Special Guests: Mike Barnes, Cody Dickinson, Fred Eltringham, Sherman Ewing, Ruthie Foster, Audley Freed, John "JoJo" Hermann, Terence Higgins, Ron Holloway, Ron Johnson, Robert Kearns, Kevn Kinney, Ivan Neville

=== 2009 ===
Asheville Civic Center (Saturday, December 12, 2009)

Featuring: Counting Crows, Ani DiFranco, Gov't Mule, moe., George Porter Jr., Eric Krasno, Nigel Hall & Adam Deitch with a Very Special Performance from Stax Records Legend William Bell.

Special Guests: Aerosmith's Brad Whitford, Troy "Trombone Shorty" Andrews, Jeff Austin, Mike Barnes, DJ Logic, Jackie Greene, Col. Bruce Hampton, Jimmy Herring of Widespread Panic, Kevn Kinney & Collective Soul's Ed Roland.

Plus The Xmas Jam Band Featuring: Fred Eltringham, Audley Freed of the Black Crowes, Ron Holloway & Robert Kearns (musician).

=== 2008 ===
Asheville Civic Center (Friday, December 12, 2008 & Saturday, December 13, 2008)

For the 20th Anniversary, The Xmas Jam was changed to a two-night event.

Night 1: Friday, December 12, 2008

Featuring: The Allman Brothers Band, The Del McCoury Band, The Derek Trucks Band, Gov't Mule, John Paul Jones, Ivan Neville's Dumpstaphunk, Joan Osborne, Travis Tritt

Special Guests: Karl Denson, Robben Ford, Ruthie Foster, JJ Grey, Matt Grondin, Ron Holloway, Eric Krasno, The Lee Boys, Susan Tedeschi, Tal Wilkenfeld

Night 2: Saturday, December 13, 2008

Featuring: Ben Harper & Relentless7, Coheed & Cambria, Steve Earle, Michael Franti & Jay Bowman Acoustic, Gov't Mule, John Paul Jones, Johnny Winter, Xmas Jam Band

Special Guests: Mike Barnes, Buddy Cage, Karl Denson, Fiddle Dave, Robben Ford, Ruthie Foster, Audley Freed, Jen Gunderman, Ron Holloway, Patterson Hood, Derrick Johnson, Robert Kearns, Kevn Kinney, Eric Krasno, Edwin McCain, Joan Osborne, Mickey Raphael, Craig Sorrells, Travis Tritt

=== 2007 ===
Asheville Civic Center (Saturday, December 15, 2007)

Featuring: Jackson Browne, Peter Frampton, G. Love, Gov't Mule, Bruce Hornsby, Grace Potter & The Nocturnals, Stockholm Syndrome

Special Guests: Mike Barnes, Mike Farris, Audley Freed, Col. Bruce Hampton, Ron Holloway, Jason Isbell, Robert Kearns, Kevn Kinney, Bernie Worrell

=== 2006 ===
Asheville Civic Center (Saturday, December 16, 2006)
Featuring: Dave Matthews, Gov't Mule, The John Popper Project Featuring DJ Logic, Marty Stuart and his Fabulous Superlatives, New Orleans Social Club Feat. Henry Butler, Leo Nocentelli, Ivan Neville, George Porter & Raymond Weber, Taj Mahal Trio

Special Guests: Mike Barnes, Brendan Bayliss, Randall Bramblett, Audley Freed, Col. Bruce Hampton, Taylor Hicks, Kevn Kinney, Branford Marsalis, Mickey Raphael, Dave Schools

=== 2005 ===
Asheville Civic Center (Saturday, December 17, 2005)
Featuring: Gov't Mule, SerialPod, Hot Tuna, Marty Stuart, Ralph Stanley, Ray LaMontagne

Special Guests: Mike Barnes, Audley Freed, Ron Holloway, Paterson Hood, Jason Isbell, Kevn Kinney, Edwin McCain, John Medeski, Stanton Moore, Brad Morgan Ivan Neville, Dave Schools, Dr. Ralph Stanley, Marty Stuart, Trey Anastasio, Bill Kreutzmann, Mike Gordon, John Schofield

=== 2004 ===
Asheville Civic Center (Saturday, December 18, 2004)
Featuring: Gov't Mule, Neville Brothers, Little Feat, Living Colour, Galactic

Special Guests: Mike Barnes, Audley Freed, Col. Bruce Hampton, Alvin Youngblood Heart, Ron Holloway, Kevn Kinney, Edwin McCain, Charlie Musselwhite, John Popper, Dave Schools

=== 2003 ===
Asheville Civic Center (Saturday, December 20, 2003)
Featuring: Warren Haynes, Gregg Allman, North Mississippi Allstars, Keller Williams, Sonny Landreth

Special Guests: John Bell, Jeff Austin, Mike Barnes, Doug Belote, Sam Bush, John Cowan, Tinsley Ellis, Col. Bruce Hampton, Andy Hess, Dave Johnston, Michael Kang, Kevn Kinney, Danny Louis, Edwin McCain, Todd Nance, Artimus Pyle, Paul Riddle, Dave Schools

=== 2002 ===
Asheville Civic Center (Saturday, December 21, 2002)
Featuring: Gov't Mule, Robert Randolph & The Family Band, Moe., Bob Weir, John Hiatt and The Goners

Special Guests: Rob Barraco, DJ Logic, Audley Freed, Jerry Joseph, Col. Bruce Hampton, Kevn Kinney, Sonny Landreth, John Molo, Edwin McCain, Dave Schools

=== 2001 ===
Asheville Civic Center (Saturday, December 21, 2001)
Featuring: Gov't Mule, Phil Lesh & Friends, Blues Traveler, Drivin' n' Cryin'

Special Guests: Danny Barns, Oteil Burbridge, Audley Freed. Mike Gordon, Col. Bruce Hampton, Alvin Youngblood Hart, Jimmy Herring, Edwin McCain, Robert Randolph, Dave Schools

=== 2000 ===
Thomas Wolf Auditorium (Saturday, December 21, 2000)
Featuring: Gregg Allman, Butch Trucks, Jaimoe, Oteil Burbridge, Jimmy Herring, John Popper, Warren Haynes, Matt Abts, Edwin McCain, Aquarium Rescue Unit

Special Guests: Mike Barnes, Dr. Dan, Audley Freed, Robert Kearns, Kevn Kinney Dan Matrazzo, Edwin McCain, Floyd Miles, John Popper, Paul Riddle, Dave Schools

This show was released on CD as Warren Haynes Presents: The Benefit Concert Vol. 2

=== 1999 ===
Thomas Wolf Auditorium (Saturday, December 22, 1999)
Featuring: Gov't Mule, Cry Of Love, Susan Tedeschi, Derek Trucks, Edwin McCain, Warren Haynes

Special Guests: Mike Barnes, Audley Freed, Col. Bruce Hampton, Jimmy Herring, Larry McCray, Little Milton, Johnny Neel, Paul Riddle

This show was released on CD as Wintertime Blues: The Benefit Concert

=== 1998 ===
Be Here Now (Saturday, December 19, 1998)
Featuring: Warren Haynes & Friends, Derek Trucks Band, Edwin McCain
