= Sacred Steel =

Sacred Steel may refer to:

- Sacred Steel (band), a German extreme power metal band
- Sacred Steel (musical tradition), a musical tradition within certain African-American Churches
