= Ropeadope Records =

American record label

- Founded: 1999
- Distributors: Symphonic Distribution (Digital); Fatbeats (Physical)
- Genre: Jazz; R&B; Americana; folk; rock; electronic
- Country of origin: U.S.
- Location: Haddon Heights, New Jersey
- Official website: www.ropeadope.com

Ropeadope Records is an American record label known for recordings in a variety of genres including jazz, hip hop, gospel and electronic music. The label, now led by Louis Marks, was founded in 1999 by Andy Hurwitz in New York City and later moved to Philadelphia.

In January 2014, Ropeadope artists Snarky Puppy and Lalah Hathaway were awarded the Grammy for Best R&B Performance.

== Roster and releases ==
Artist	Titles Released with Ropeadope
Adam Smale	Out of the Blue
Alison Wedding	
Antibalas	Who Is This America?
Dimitrije Vasiljevic	Us Accidental Nomad
Duski	Make a Wish
Eric Binder Trio	Hard Bop
Lakecia Benjamin	Rise Up Pursuance: The Coltranes Phoenix Reimagined (Live)
Nir Felder	II
Escaper	Apotheosis
Alexander Flood	HEARTBEAT
Spirit Fingers	PEACE
Dekel Bor	Let Love Rule
Seth Trachy	Zygmon
Thor De Force	The Build
Aaron Parks	Little Big Little Big II: Dreams Of A Mechanical Man
Matty Stecks & Musical Tramps	Long Time Ago Rumble
Chief Xian aTunde Adjuah	Stretch Music Ruler Rebel Diaspora The Emancipation Procrastination Ancestral Recall Axiom Bark Out Thunder Roar Out Lightning
Terrace Martin	Velvet Portraits
Terrace Martin Presents The Pollyseeds	Sounds Of Crenshaw Vol. 1
Eddie Palmieri	Sabiduria Full Circle Mi Luz Mayor
David Whitman	Soul Flow
M'lumbo	Fairytale Aliens Celestial Mechanics

Current and former artists:

- Adam Smale
- Alison Wedding
- Antibalas
- Joey Arkenstat
- Ben Arnold
- Benevento/Russo Duo
- Bodega
- Bullfrog
- Brainbheats
- Cabinet
- Frank Catalano
- Carlon
- The Campbell Brothers
- Consider the Source
- Critters Buggin
- Hal Crook
- Darnell Little
- The Detroit Experiment
- DJ Klock
- DJ Logic
- Dirty Dozen Brass Band
- fDeluxe
- Mike Gordon
- Great Peacock
- The Harlem Experiment
- Taku Hirano
- Charlie Hunter
- HUW
- King Britt
- T.J. Kirk
- Jneiro Jarel
- Jazzanova
- Jonathan Scales Fourchestra
- M'lumbo
- Naughty Professor
- Karikatura
- Christian McBride
- Medeski, Martin and Wood
- Michael Kammers/MK Groove Orchestra & Trio
- None But The Righteous
- Paul Beaubrun
- The Philadelphia Experiment
- Bobby Previte
- Japhy Ryder
- Scratch
- Sex Mob
- Skerik's Syncopated Taint Septet
- Snarky Puppy
- Spanish Harlem Orchestra
- Spare Parts
- The Spinning Leaves
- Teddy Presberg
- Terrace Martin
- Tin Hat Trio
- Toy Soldiers
- Um
- The Word
- Yeni Nostalji
- The Yohimbe Brothers
- Eddie Palmieri
- RC & The Gritz

== Releases ==
- 2001: Stray Dog by Hal Crook
- 2001: The Word by The Word
- 2001: The Philadelphia Experiment
- 2002: In Between (Jazzanova album)
- 2002: Front End Lifter by the Yohimbe Brothers (Vernon Reid and DJ Logic)
- 2003: Inside In by Mike Gordon
- 2003: Skerik's Syncopated Taint Septet (album)
- 2004: Friends Seen and Unseen
- 2005: Zen Of Logic (DJ Logic)
- 2006: The Coalition of the Willing by Bobby Previte
- 2006: Live at Tonic (Christian McBride)
- 2006: The Harlem Experiment
- 2007: Live at Tonic (Marco Benevento)
- 2008: Un-Herd Vol. 1 (Y?Arcka)
- 2011: Gaslight by fDeluxe
- 2012: GroundUP by Snarky Puppy
- 2014: Love Supreme Collective - EP by Frank Catalano
- 2015: Shoulder Season by Sidewalk Chalk
- 2015: Stretch Music by Christian Scott aTunde Adjuah
- 2016: Velvet Portraits by Terrace Martin
- 2016: The Feel by RC & The Gritz
- 2017: Sabiduria by Eddie Palmieri
- 2017: Ruler Rebel by Christian Scott aTunde Adjuah
- 2017: Diaspora by Christian Scott aTunde Adjuah
- 2017: The Emancipation Procrastination by Christian Scott aTunde Adjuah
- 2018: Full Circle by Eddie Palmieri
- 2018: Mi Luz Mayor by Eddie Palmieri
- 2018: Gran Pavo Real by Great Peacock
- 2018: Rise Up by Lakecia Benjamin
- 2019: Ancestral Recall by Christian Scott aTunde Adjuah
- 2019: Analog World by RC & The Gritz
- 2019: Soul Flow by David Whitman
- 2020: Fairytale Aliens by M'lumbo with Page Hamilton
- 2020: Celestial Mechanics by M'lumbo with Jane Ira Bloom
- 2020: Pursuance: The Coltranes by Lakecia Benjamin
- 2021: Blu York by Taku Hirano
- 2024: Phoenix Reimagined (Live) by Lakecia Benjamin

== Awards and nominations ==
=== Grammy Awards ===
Multiple artists at Ropeadope Records have been nominated for and won awards at the annual Grammy Awards.

Artist	Release Title	Category	Year	Result	Ref.
Snarky Puppy featuring Lalah Hatahway	Something	Best R&B Performance	2013	Won	
Terrace Martin	Velvet Portraits	Best R&B Album	2016	Nominated	
Nate Smith	Home Free (For Peter Joe)	Best Arrangement, Instrumental or A Capella	2017	Nominated	
Nate Smith	Home Free (For Peter Joe)	Best Instrumental Composition	2017	Nominated	
Christian Scott aTunde Adjuah	The Emancipation Procrastination	Best Contemporary Instrumental Album	2018	Nominated	
Christian Scott aTunde Adjuah	Ancestral Recall	Best Contemporary Instrumental Album	2019	Nominated	
David Sánchez	Carib	Best Latin Jazz Album	2019	Nominated	
Christian Scott aTunde Adjuah	Axiom	Best Contemporary Instrumental Album	2020	Nominated	
Christian Scott aTunde Adjuah	Guinevere	Best Improvised Jazz Solo	2020	Nominated	

=== Independent Music Awards ===
Artist	Release Title	Category	Year	Result	Ref.
David Whitman	Shuffle Blues	Blues Song	2020	Nominated	
David Whitman	With Love	Jazz Instrumental Song	2020	Nominated	
David Whitman, Chris Montgomery	Soul Flow	Jazz Music Producer	2020	Nominated	
