= Hero Worship (Hal Crook album) =

Studio album by Hal Crook
- Released: 1997
- Recorded: 1996
- Genre: Jazz
- Length: 67 minutes
- Label: RAM Records
- Producer: Raimondo Meli Lupi

Hal Crook chronology
Narayani (1997)	Hero Worship (1997)	Stray Dog (2001)

Professional ratings
Review scores
Source	Rating
Allmusic	3/5 stars
The Penguin Guide to Jazz Recordings	3.5/4 stars

Hero Worship was Hal Crook's fifth album as a leader, and the second album he released for RAM Records.

This album was Crook's first recording using the 5-voice digital harmonizer, which connected to a microphone attached to his trombone's bell. The harmonizer generates up to 5 additional "voices" at preset intervals, which allowed Crook to play chordal lines using an otherwise multiphonic instrument. The early-generation harmonizer did not distinguish between major and minor intervals, which created a distinctive effect.

== Track listing ==
1. Noticed Moments – 3:44
2. Bluezo – 7:25
3. A Simpler Time – 8:57
4. Night and Day – 7:13
5. Teen Mind – 8:46
6. Cathedral Song – 2:59
7. My Funny Valentine – 6:42
8. Hero Worship – 8:22
9. Falling Grace – 5:11
10. You Do Something To Me – 7:47

== Personnel ==
- Hal Crook – trombone, 5-voice digital harmonizer
- Mick Goodrick – guitar
- Paul Motian – drums
