= Torch (Honeytribe album) =

Studio album by Devon Allman's Honeytribe
- Released: August 29, 2006
- Recorded: 2006
- Genre: Blues rock
- Label: Livewire
- Producer: Devon Allman

Devon Allman's Honeytribe chronology
Torch (2006)	Space Age Blues (2010)

Torch is the first album by Devon Allman's Honeytribe. It was originally released in 2006, by Livewire Recordings, then rereleased in 2007 by Provogue Records.

== Reception ==
Thom Jurek of AllMusic said the album "feels like a debut album", but not an "overly impressive debut." While he praised individual musicians' skill, he was not impressed with the overall production and the final mix; still, he said the band was "surely on the right track."

== Track listing ==
All songs composed by Devon Allman, except where noted.

No.	Title	Music	Length
1.	"Torch"		3:12
2.	"Mahalo"	Allman, Dave Kalz	5:20
3.	"No Woman, No Cry"	Vincent Ford	3:42
4.	"When I Call Home"		4:39
5.	"Perfect World"		3:36
6.	"Mercy Mercy"		2:45
7.	"Something I Know"		4:48
8.	"Heaven Has No Mercy"		3:41
9.	"Why You Wanna Bring Me Down?"		2:52
10.	"511 Texas Avenue"	Allman, Kirkner	1:29
11.	"Nothing to Be Sad About"		3:02

== Personnel ==
Devon Allman's Honeytribe

- Devon Allman – vocals and guitars
- George Potsos – bass guitar
- Jack Kirkner – keyboards, (piano, Hammond B-3 organ, Wurlitzer electric piano)
- Mark Oyarzabal – drums and percussion

Guests

- Pedro Arevalo – slide guitar on "No Woman, No Cry", "Heaven Has No Mercy" and "Why You Wanna Bring Me Down?"
- Tony Antonelli – percussion on "Mahalo"
- Joe Bonamassa – guitar on "Mercy Mercy"
