= We Walk This Road =

Studio album by Robert Randolph and the Family Band
- Released: June 22, 2010
- Genres: R&B, rock, blues, funk, gospel
- Length: 55:53
- Label: Warner Bros.
- Producer: T Bone Burnett

Robert Randolph and the Family Band chronology
Colorblind (2006)	We Walk This Road (2010)	Lickety Split (2013)

Professional ratings
Review scores
Source	Rating
AllMusic	3.5/5 stars
Billboard	4/5 stars
The Daily Telegraph	4/5 stars
The Guardian	3/5 stars
The Independent	(favourable)
Paste Magazine	(6.8/10)
PopMatters	7/10 stars
Rolling Stone	3.5/5 stars
Spin	(favourable)

We Walk This Road is the third studio album of Robert Randolph and the Family Band released in 2010 upon Warner Bros. Records. The album rose to No. 4 on the Billboard Top Christian Albums chart and No. 21 on the Billboard Top Rock Albums chart.

== Overview ==
We Walk This Road is a mixture of original material and covers, recorded as a collaborative effort between Robert Randolph, T Bone Burnett, Tonio K., Peter Case, and other soul- and gospel-oriented songwriters. The album also includes covers of songs by Blind Willie Johnson, Bob Dylan, John Lennon, and Prince as interpreted by Randolph and Burnett. The "Segue" tracks are segments of public domain performances by the blues musician Blind Willie Johnson.

== Track listing ==
No.	Title	Writer(s)	Length
1.	"Segue 1"	Johnson	0:25
2.	"Traveling Shoes"	Burnett, Randolph, Tonio K.	3:48
3.	"Segue 2"	Johnson	0:09
4.	"Back to the Wall"	Gray	3:30
5.	"Shot of Love"	Dylan	5:36
6.	"I Still Belong to Jesus"	Case	6:01
7.	"Segue 3"	Johnson	0:27
8.	"If I Had My Way"	Burnett, Johnson, Randolph, Tonio K.	5:25
9.	"Segue 4"	Johnson	0:21
10.	"Don't Change"	Gray, Hamlin	4:47
11.	"I Don't Wanna Be a Soldier Mama"	Lennon	5:49
12.	"Walk Don't Walk"	Prince	4:06
13.	"Segue 5"	Johnson	0:19
14.	"Dry Bones"	Burnett, Case, Randolph, Tonio K.	3:42
15.	"Segue 6"	Johnson	0:16
16.	"I'm Not Listening"	Burnett, Case, Randolph, Tonio K.	5:03
17.	"Salvation"	Hogarth, McEwan, Train	5:59

=== iTunes bonus tracks ===
18. "Take My Hand" - 3:51
19. "Don't Let the Devil Ride" - 4:23
20. "Memphis Beat" - 3:34

== Personnel ==
=== Album line-up ===
- Robert Randolph - pedal steel guitar (tracks 2, 4, 5, 6, 8, 10, 11, 12, 14, 16, 17), lead vocals (2, 5, 6, 14), vocals (4, 8, 11, 12, 16)
- Danyel Morgan - bass (tracks 2, 5, 6, 8, 10, 11, 14), lead vocals (10, 17), vocals (2, 4, 5, 6, 8, 11, 12, 14, 16, 17)
- Marcus Randolph - steel guitar (tracks 10, 14, 16)

=== Guest appearances ===
- Jay Bellerose - drums (tracks 2, 4, 6, 10, 12, 16, 17)
- Doyle Bramhall II - guitar, vocals (track 11), acoustic guitar (track 17)
- T Bone Burnett - guitar (tracks 2, 5, 11, 14)
- Keefus Ciancia - keyboards (tracks 2, 5, 6, 8, 10, 11, 14, 16)
- Dennis Crouch - bass (track 16)
- Mike Elizondo - bass (tracks 4, 12), guitar (track 4)
- Will Gray - featured vocals (track 4)
- Jason Hamlin - acoustic guitar (track 10)
- Ben Harper - slide guitar, vocals (track 8)
- Jim Keltner - drums (tracks 4, 5, 8, 11, 12, 14, 17)
- Ben Kesler - banjo, drum programming, sequencing (track 4), recording engineer (track 10)
- Ken Kugler - tuba (track 6)
- Nick Lane - euphonium (track 6)
- Darrell Leonard - trumpet, trombonium, horn arrangements (track 6)
- Lenesha Randolph - vocals (tracks 2, 4, 5, 6, 8, 12, 14, 16, 17)
- Leon Russell - piano (track 17)
- Tommy Sims - bass (track 17)
- Ken Tussing - flugelbone (track 6)
- Patrick Warren - keyboards (tracks 4, 12, 17)

== Production ==
- T Bone Burnett – Producer
- Lenny Waronker - Producer (tracks 4, 12, 17)
- Mike Piersante - Engineer
- Tom Whalley - Executive Producer
