= Stray Dog (Hal Crook album) =

Live album by Hal Crook
- Released: 2001
- Recorded: 1999
- Genre: Jazz
- Length: 54 minutes
- Label: Outrageous/Ropeadope Records

Hal Crook chronology
Hero Worship (1997)	Stray Dog (2001)

Professional ratings
Review scores
Source	Rating
Allmusic	3/5 stars

Stray Dog was Hal Crook's sixth album as a leader. It was recorded live at Club AS220 in Providence, Rhode Island, where Crook's band held a recurring Tuesday night gig for several years. Crook plays his signature "Trom-o-Tizer," which consists of a trombone with a small microphone directing its signal through a digital effects unit, allowing him to access various effects including chorus, delay, and a 5-voice digital harmonizer.

== Track listing ==
1. Bushwacker — 5:47
2. Gizmosis — 2:15
3. Walter's World — 7:15
4. Stray Dog (Part 1) — 9:28
5. Repulse Impulse — 4:41
6. Teen Mind — 4:52
7. Pervert — 9:33
8. Stray Dog (Part 2) — 5:53
9. Um — 12:38

== Personnel ==
- Hal Crook — Trom-o-Tizer
- Rick Peckham — guitar
- John Medeski — organ
- Dave Zinno — bass
- Bob Gullotti — drums
