= Great Peacock =

Americana and folk rock band

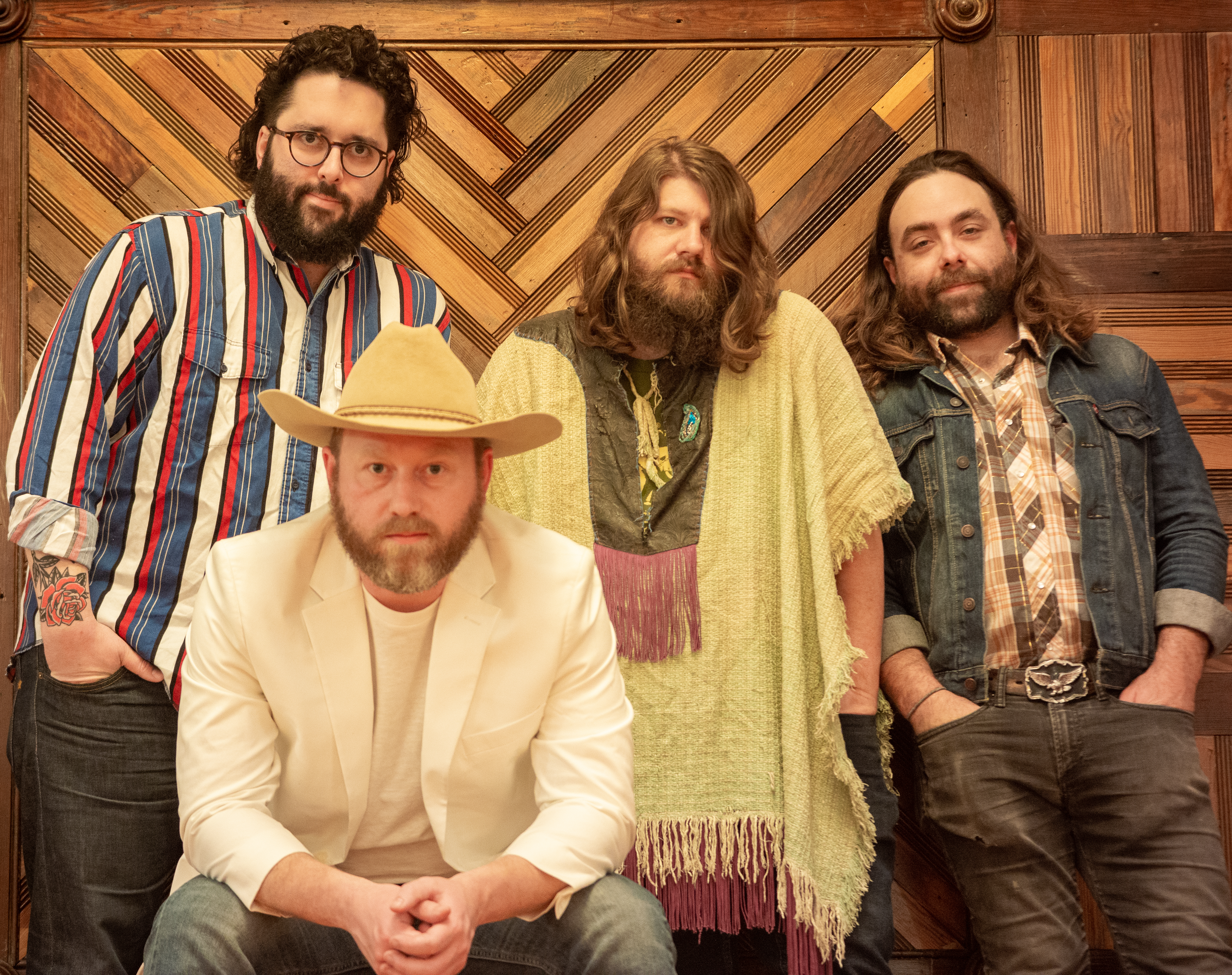
- Great Peacock in 2021. Left to right: Frank Keith IV, Andrew Nelson (seated), Blount Floyd, and Nick Recio

Background information
- Origin: Nashville, Tennessee, U.S.
- Genres: Americana; folk rock; Southern rock; country rock; heartland rock
- Years active: 2013–present
- Labels: This Is American Music; Ropeadope; Baldwin County Public Records; Soundly Music
- Members: Andrew Nelson; Blount Floyd; Frank Keith IV; Nick Recio

Great Peacock is an American Americana and folk rock band based in Nashville, Tennessee. Formed in 2013 by co-founders Andrew Nelson and Blount Floyd, the band's music features harmony-driven vocals, acoustic-based arrangements, and elements of Americana, Southern rock, country rock, and heartland rock.

== History ==
=== Formation ===
Andrew Nelson grew up outside Birmingham, Alabama, where his early musical exposure came from blues artists including John Lee Hooker, Freddie King, B.B. King, and Buddy Guy, before later being drawn to country music through Ryan Adams and George Jones. Blount Floyd was raised in southern Alabama and grew up on 1990s country music.

Nelson and Floyd met in their early 20s in Nashville and played together in several rock bands during the early 2010s before turning toward harmony-driven material. The pair conceived the project at a West Nashville bar in late 2012, settling on an animal-themed two-word name and writing the song "Desert Lark" the same evening. Posted to Bandcamp in the winter of 2013, "Desert Lark" received airplay on Nashville's Lightning 100 and became the centerpiece of the duo's early live sets.

=== Recordings ===
Great Peacock released a self-titled extended play in 2013, followed by their debut studio album, Making Ghosts, in May 2015 on the independent label This Is American Music. The album was produced by Dan Fernandez and was reviewed by American Songwriter, which described it as "stirring" and noted the band's roots-oriented, anthemic sensibility.

The band's second studio album, Gran Pavo Real, was released on March 30, 2018, by Ropeadope. Tom Blankenship of My Morning Jacket played bass throughout the record; according to Americana UK, Blankenship was originally booked to contribute to a single song but elected to stay on for the entire album. The album was also previewed by Americana UK. Around this period, Rolling Stone included Great Peacock in its "10 New Country Artists You Need to Know: March 2018" feature.

In September 2019, Billboard premiered the band's cover of Neil Young's "Cortez the Killer," noting that the recording previewed a more classic-rock-influenced direction for their forthcoming third album.

The band's third studio album, Forever Worse Better, was self-produced and released on October 9, 2020, on Baldwin County Public Records with distribution by Soundly Music. Tracking sessions took place at Nashville's Sound Emporium Studios, with additional recording at Floyd's home studio, and the record featured guest contributions from guitarist Sadler Vaden of Jason Isbell and the 400 Unit and pedal-steel player Adam Kurtz. The album reached the Americana radio top 50 and remained on the chart for several months, and was reviewed positively by Americana Highways.

== Musical style ==
Great Peacock's music has been described as combining Americana, folk rock, Southern rock, and country rock, with an emphasis on vocal harmonies and acoustic and electric guitar arrangements. Relix has characterized the band's later material as drawing on classic-rock influences within a contemporary Americana framework. In interviews, the band has cited Tom Petty, Bruce Springsteen, Neil Young, and George Jones among their songwriting influences.

== Critical reception ==
Rolling Stone featured Great Peacock in its "10 New Country Artists You Need to Know" series in March 2018, describing them as a band with "a sense of humor" who had grown from a duo into a full band performing "a textured, roots-influenced breed of rock & roll." Billboard has covered the band in connection with their recorded material, including their cover of "Cortez the Killer."

The band has also been the subject of features and interviews in Relix, PopMatters, American Songwriter, Holler, Americana UK, and the NPR-affiliated public radio station WMOT.

== Live performances ==
Great Peacock has toured throughout the United States and appeared on the festival circuit. The band performed a live session at the South by Southwest festival in March 2013, recorded by Paste. They appeared at the Candler Park Music & Food Festival in Atlanta in 2016, at the Shaky Knees Music Festival in 2017, and at the Bristol Rhythm & Roots Reunion.

In 2019, the band toured as a special guest on select dates with The Revivalists and Anderson East. They co-headlined a spring tour with Cordovas in 2021 and have also opened for The Infamous Stringdusters.

The band has also been featured in nationally distributed live session series, including the WKYU/PBS-produced Lost River Sessions (Season 2) and Audiotree Live, for which they recorded a four-song session in 2015.

== Members ==
Current members

- Andrew Nelson – lead vocals, acoustic and electric guitars, keyboards (2013–present)
- Blount Floyd – vocals, acoustic and electric guitars, mandolin, keyboards (2013–present)
- Frank Keith IV – bass guitar (2017–present)
- Nick Recio – drums

Former members

- Ben Cunningham – bass guitar

== Discography ==
=== Studio albums ===
- Making Ghosts (2015, This Is American Music)
- Gran Pavo Real (2018, Ropeadope)
- Forever Worse Better (2020, Baldwin County Public Records / Soundly Music)

=== Extended plays ===
- Great Peacock (2013)

=== Live albums ===
- Great Peacock – Audiotree Live (2015)
- Less Is More – Live & Acoustic (2022)
