= Space Age Blues =

Studio album by Devon Allman's Honeytribe
- Released: October 12, 2010
- Recorded: 2010
- Genre: Blues rock
- Length: 45:31
- Label: Provogue
- Producer: Devon Allman

Devon Allman's Honeytribe chronology
Torch (2006)	Space Age Blues (2010)

Professional ratings
Review scores
Source	Rating
Premier Guitar	4/5

Space Age Blues is the second album by Devon Allman's Honeytribe. It was released in Europe on October 12, 2010, and in the U.S. on October 25, 2010. In addition to the power-trio of Devon Allman, George Potsos and Gabriel Strange, the album also contains appearances by Huey Lewis on harmonica and Ron Holloway on tenor saxophone.

== Recording ==
The album was recorded in early 2010, at Ardent Studios, Memphis, Tennessee. The band took over Studio C, which they called "The Mothership", and hung colored lights and science-fiction posters to create atmosphere. They even wore authentic NASA spacesuits to get into the spirit. While Huey Lewis and the News were recording in Studio A, Lewis overheard some sounds from Studio C and asked if he could contribute his harmonica to the record. The songs were mixed and engineered by Pete Matthews, and co-produced by Devon Allman and Matthews.

== Reception ==
Rick Moore, in American Songwriter magazine, reported this "is a great choice for someone who wants to hear a good example of how today's musicians long for the time when originality, creativity and just plugging in to play meant something".

Thom Jurek, on AllMusic, stated "it's the music itself that matters, and Space Age Blues mostly succeeds", and "as musically forceful as this set is, the tunes here will likely come off more explosively live. Fans of Honeytribe's Torch album and those hard rock-blues aficionados unacquainted with Allman's considerable gifts as a guitarist will find much to celebrate on Space Age Blues".

Gary Thorn of Shockwave Magazine went on to say "Years from now, I think people will look at this album as a fundamental part of a blues revival, bringing blues back to the mainstream for a new generation".

About.com selected Space Age Blues as No. 1 on its list of Best Blues-Rock Albums of 2010. The report describes the album as "not your typical blues-rock album", being "infused with high-octane performances", "positioning blues-rock for a new decade and new century that still places a premium on six-string talents" and stating "if you like blues and you like rock, it's well worth your time to check out Space Age Blues".

== Track listing ==
All music and lyrics written by Devon Allman, except where noted.

No.	Title	Music	Length
1.	"Could Get Dangerous"		4:14
2.	"Space Age Blues"		5:16
3.	"Salvation"		4:42
4.	"Sir Duke"	Stevie Wonder	3:47
5.	"Endless Diamond"		4:45
6.	"Blue Est Le Vide"		1:54
7.	"Warm in Wintertime"		4:30
8.	"New Pet Monkey"		4:08
9.	"I'm Ready"	Allman, Seth Davis	4:45
10.	"Take Me to the Bridge"	Allman, Potsos	3:29
11.	"Insh'allah"		4:02

== Personnel ==
Devon Allman's Honeytribe

- Devon Allman – vocals, guitars, Korg Kaossilator, piano on "New Pet Monkey"
- George Potsos – bass guitar
- Gabriel Strange – drums

Guests

- Huey Lewis – harmonica on "Could Get Dangerous"
- Ron Holloway – saxophone on "Space Age Blues", "Salvation" and "New Pet Monkey"
- Rick Steff – keyboards
- Tony Antonelli – percussion
- Bobby Yang – violin on "Warm In Wintertime"

== Chart performance ==
Space Age Blues debuted at No. 7 on the Billboard chart for Blues Albums during the week of November 13, 2010.
