= Only Human (Hal Crook album) =

Studio album by Hal Crook
- Released: 1993
- Genre: Jazz
- Length: 54 minutes
- Label: RAM Records
- Producer: Raimondo Meli Lupi

Hal Crook chronology
Conjunction (1992)	Only Human (1993)	Narayani (1997)

Professional ratings
Review scores
Source	Rating
Allmusic	4/5 stars
The Penguin Guide to Jazz Recordings	3/4 stars

Only Human was Hal Crook's third album as a leader, and the first album he released for RAM Records. It was recorded on June 11, 1993, at Sound Techniques in Boston, Massachusetts. None of the music had been rehearsed, and the session produced 11 tracks. In addition to the 6 tracks released on this album, the remaining 5 were planned for a second album. Although this second album was never released, it was assigned a title and catalog number by RAM Records: Stardust, RMCD 4516.

== Track listing ==
1. Show – 10:08
2. Only Human – 10:25
3. Brazil – 9:02
4. Soulmates – 7:37
5. Suddenly It’s Spring – 9:57
6. Outer Edge – 6:26

== Personnel ==
- Hal Crook — trombone
- John Lockwood — bass
- Bob Gullotti — drums
