= RC & The Gritz =

American band

- Origin: Dallas, Texas, U.S.
- Genres: Hip hop; jazz; funk; fusion; soul
- Years active: 2004–present
- Label: Ropeadope
- Members: RC Williams; Cleon Edwards; Braylon Lacy; Jah Born; Jonathan Mones; Claudia Melton; Evan Knight; Mike Jelani Brooks
- Past members: TaRon Lockett Robert Sput Searight
- Website: rcandthegritz.com

RC & The Gritz is an American soul, R&B, and hip-hop ensemble from Dallas, Texas. They were established in 2004 originally as a trio featuring grammy award winning drummer Robert Sput Searight and bassist Braylon Lacy and RC Williams who mostly led the group, who performs on keyboards. Occasionally they would bring in Claudia Melton to provide vocals. They also at the time were the rhythm section for Erykah Badu.

== History ==
Since the early 2000s, Williams has been serving as music director, producer, and keyboardist for Badu. In 2005, Williams and members of the Gritz band began hosting a weekly open-mic at the now-defunct Prophet Bar in Dallas' Deep Ellum area.

RC & The Gritz self-released its debut album, Pay Your Tab, in 2013. This included the single "That Kinda Girl," which featured Snoop Dogg and Raheem DeVaughn. The band worked with artists such as Sarah Jaffe, Bernard Wright, Shaun Martin, and Shelley Carrol on their follow up album and first release under the Ropeadope label, The Feel in 2016.

== Members ==
RC & The Gritz has eight primary members and 11 rotating members.

=== Primary ===
- RC Williams – Keys, Vocals
- Cleon Edwards – Drums
- Braylon Lacy – Bass
- Jah Born – Programmer/MPC
- Jonathan Mones – Alto Sax, Flute
- Claudia Melton – Vocals
- Evan Knight – Sax
- Mike Jelani Brooks – Tenor Saxophone, Flute

=== Original ===
- RC Williams – Keys, Vocals
- Robert Sput Searight– Drums
- Braylon Lacy – Bass

=== Rotating ===
- Miracle Foster – (Vocals)
- Durand Bernarr – Vocals
- Matt Ramsey – Bass
- Mark Lettieri – Guitar
- Bianca Rodriguez – Vocals
- A.J. Brown – Bass
- Nicholas Rothouse – Percussion
- Kazunori Tanaka – Trumpet
- Mike Clowes – Guitar
- Marcus Jones – Drums
- Frank Moka- Percussion

== Discography ==
- Pay Your Tab (Independent, 2013)
- The Feel (Ropeadope, 2016)
- Analog World (Ropeadope, 2019)
- Live In LA (Spectrasonics) (Independent, 2019)
- Live in Deep Ellum (2021)
