= Colorblind (Robert Randolph album) =

Studio album by Robert Randolph & the Family Band
- Released: October 10, 2006
- Genre: Funk, Rock
- Length: 44:08; 52:53 (bonus)
- Label: Warner Bros.
- Producer: Drew and Shannon, Tommy Sims, Mark Batson, Pete Kipley, Victor & Cedric Caldwell

Robert Randolph & the Family Band chronology
Unclassified (2003)	Colorblind (2006)	We Walk This Road (2010)

Professional ratings
Review scores
Source	Rating
AllMusic	4/5 stars

Colorblind is an album by Robert Randolph & the Family Band. It is the group's second studio album.

== Track listing ==
1. "Ain't Nothing Wrong with That" (Andrew Ramsey, Robert Randolph, Shannon Sanders) - 3:30
2. "Deliver Me" (Robert Randolph, Gary Nicholson, Tommy Sims) – 4:30
3. "Diane" (Mark Batson, Robert Randolph) – 3:28
4. "Angels" (Mark Batson, Robert Randolph, Shannon Sanders, David J. Matthews) – 4:02
5. "Jesus Is Just Alright" (Arthur S. Reynolds) – 5:26
6. "Stronger" (Robert Randolph, Steve McEwan, Danyel Morgan, Jason Crosby) – 4:10
7. "Thrill of It" (Robert Randolph, Danyel Morgan, Marcus Randolph, Jeff Trott, Jason Crosby) – 3:28
8. "Blessed" (Robert Randolph, Tommy Sims, Lenesha Randolph) – 3:45
9. "Love Is the Only Way" (Mark Batson, David J. Matthews) – 4:24
10. "Thankful 'N Thoughtful" (Sylvester Stewart)– 3:43
11. "Homecoming" (Andrew Ramsey, Robert Randolph, Shannon Sanders) – 3:51
12. "Do Yourself a Favor" (iTunes bonus track) – 8:40

== Personnel ==
=== Album line-up ===
- Robert Randolph - pedal steel guitar (tracks 1, 11), guitars (2, 3, 4, 5, 6, 7, 8, 9, 10), lead vocals (1, 2, 8, 11), background vocals (1, 11), vocals (2, 3, 4, 5, 6, 7, 8, 9)
- Danyel Morgan - bass (all tracks), lead vocals (1, 10, 11), background vocals (1, 2, 11), vocals (2, 3, 4, 5, 6, 7, 8, 9), stomps, claps (1)
- Marcus Randolph - drums (all tracks), stomps, claps (1), background vocals (11)
- Jason Crosby - keyboards (tracks 1, 11), Hammond organ (2, 3, 4, 5, 6, 7, 8, 9, 10), piano (2, 3, 4, 5, 6, 7, 8, 9, 10), stomps, claps (1), background vocals (11)

=== Guest appearances ===
- Mark Batson - drum programming (tracks 3, 4, 9), keyboards (4, 9)
- Eric Clapton - guitars, vocals (track 5)
- Shanna Crook - background vocals (track 1)
- Leela James - vocals (track 6)
- Dave Matthews - guitar, vocals (track 9)
- Steve McKuen - acoustic guitar (track 6)
- LeRoi Moore - tenor saxophone (tracks 3, 9)
- Drew Ramsey - guitar, background vocals (tracks 1, 11), stomps, claps (1)
- Lenesha Randolph - background vocals (tracks 1, 2, 4, 8)
- Rashawn Ross - trumpet (tracks 3, 9)
- Shannon Sanders - keyboards (tracks 1, 11), background vocals (1, 4, 11), stomps, claps (1)
- Tommy Sims - background vocals (track 2, 8)

== Production ==
- Bruce Flohr – A&R
- Serban Ghenea – Mixing
- Liza Joseph – Coordination, A&R
- Tom Whalley – Executive Producer
