= Lickety Split =

Studio album by Robert Randolph and the Family Band
- Released: July 16, 2013
- Genre: Gospel, soul, rock
- Length: 49:23
- Label: Blue Note
- Producer: Robert Randolph, Tommy Sims, Shannon Sanders & Drew Ramsey

Robert Randolph and the Family Band chronology
We Walk This Road (2010)	Lickety Split (2013)	Got Soul (2017)

Professional ratings
Aggregate scores
Source	Rating
Metacritic	67/100
Review scores
Source	Rating
AllMusic	4.5/5 stars
PopMatters	5/10

Lickety Split is the fourth studio album by American soul band Robert Randolph and the Family Band. It was released on July 16, 2013, under Blue Note Records.

== Track listing ==
No.	Title	Length
1.	"Amped Up"	3:18
2.	"Born Again"	4:20
3.	"New Orleans"	4:11
4.	"Take The Party" (featuring Troy "Trombone Shorty" Andrews)	4:09
5.	"Brand New Wayo" (featuring Carlos Santana)	4:36
6.	"Lickety Split"	4:01
7.	"Blacky Joe" (featuring Carlos Santana)	5:50
8.	"Love Rollercoaster"	3:12
9.	"All American"	2:43
10.	"Get Ready"	5:07
11.	"Welcome Home"	6:11
12.	"Good Lovin'"	2:55

== Personnel ==
=== Album line-up ===
- Robert Randolph – pedal steel guitar, guitar, vocals
- Marcus Randolph – drums
- Danyel Morgan – bass, vocals
- Brett Haas – vocals
- Lenesha Randolph – vocals

=== Guest appearances ===
- Eric Krasno – guitar ("Good Lovin'")
- Dwan Hill – organ ("Good Lovin'")
- Bekka Bramlett – backing vocals ("Born Again")
- Jason Crosby – keyboards ("Get Ready," "Lickety Split")
- Carlos Santana – guitar ("Brand New Wayo," "Blacky Joe")
- Trombone Shorty – trombone ("Take the Party")
- Adam Smirnoff – guitar ("Lickety Split")
- Tommy Sims – producer, bass, piano & guitar (Born Again, New Orleans, Brand New Wayo, Blackie Joe & Welcome Home)
