= Unclassified (Robert Randolph and the Family Band album) =

Studio album by Robert Randolph and the Family Band
- Released: August 5, 2003
- Recorded: 2003
- Length: 47:42
- Label: Warner Bros. Records
- Producer: Robert Randolph and the Family Band, Jim Scott

Robert Randolph and the Family Band chronology
Live at the Wetlands (2002)	Unclassified (2003)	Colorblind (2006)

Professional ratings
Review scores
Source	Rating
AllMusic	link

Unclassified is the first studio album by Robert Randolph and the Family Band.

PopMatters magazine reviewed the album favourably, concluding that "the one quality that holds it all together is joyousness". It described the opening track, 'Going in the Right Direction', as "a gospel-tinged, two steppin’, inspirational, tune that simply burns". The single taken from the album, 'Soul Refreshing', was described as "a light-hearted, groovy, feel good-tune in the vein of Al Green or perhaps even James Taylor".

== Track listing ==
All songs written by Robert Randolph, except for where noted.

1. "Going in the Right Direction" – 3:32
2. "I Need More Love" – 3:42
3. "Nobody" – 4:32
4. "Soul Refreshing" – 3:41
5. "Squeeze" (Randolph, Danyel Morgan) – 5:46
6. "Smile" – 4:53
7. "Good Times (3 Stroke)" – 3:47
8. "Why Should I Feel Lonely" (Randolph, Morgan) – 4:25
9. "Calypso" (Randolph, John Ginty) – 4:07
10. "Problems" (Randolph, Marcus Randolph, Ginty) – 4:24
11. "Run for Your Life" – 4:53

== Personnel ==
- Robert Randolph – Pedal Steel Guitar, Guitar (Acoustic), Guitar (Electric), Vocals
- Neal Casal – Vocals (background)
- Rick Fowler – Duet vocal on "Smile"
- John Ginty – B-3 Organ, Piano
- Leon Mobley - Percussion
- Danyel Morgan – Guitar (Acoustic), Bass, Guitar (Electric), Vocals
- Lenesha Randolph – Vocals (background), Duet vocal on "Smile"
- Marcus Randolph – Drums
- Candice Anderson – Vocals (background)

== Production ==
- Mike Buckman – Art Direction, Design
- Danny Clinch – Photography
- Gene Grimaldi – Mastering
- Ryan Hewitt – Engineer
- Chris Holmes – Assistant Engineer
- Robert Randolph and the Family Band – Producer
- Jim Scott – Producer, Engineer, Mixing
