= Stomp the Yard (soundtrack) =

Soundtrack album by Various artists
- Released: April 24, 2007
- Recorded: 2006–2007
- Genres: Hip-hop, R&B
- Length: 53:10
- Label: Artists' Addiction

Professional ratings
Review scores
Source	Rating
AllMusic	3/5 stars
RapReviews	5/10 stars

Stomp the Yard is the soundtrack to the 2007 film, Stomp the Yard. It was released on April 24, 2007, through Artists' Addiction Records and peaked at 20 on the Billboard charts' Top Soundtracks.

== Track listing ==
1. "Go Hard or Go Home" - E-40 featuring The Federation
2. "Vans" - The Pack
3. "Poppin'" - Chris Brown
4. "Sign Me Up" - Ne-Yo
5. "The Champ" - Ghostface Killah
6. "Walk It Out" - DJ Unk
7. "Pop, Lock, and Drop It" - Huey
8. "The Deepest Hood" - Al Kapone
9. "Come On" - Bonecrusher featuring Onslaught
10. "Superman's Black in the Building" - Public Enemy
11. "Storm" - Cut Chemist featuring Mr. Lif & Edan
12. "In the Music" - The Roots featuring Malik B & Porn
13. "Ain't Nothing Wrong with That" - Robert Randolph & The Family Band
14. "Bounce Wit Me" - R.E.D. 44
15. Ying Yang Twins ft. Pitbull - Shake
