= Honeytribe =

American blues rock band

- Also known as: Devon Allman's Honeytribe
- Origin: Saint Louis, Missouri, U.S.
- Genres: Blues rock
- Years active: 1999–2001, 2005–present
- Labels: Provogue, Livewire
- Members: Devon Allman; George Potsos; Gabriel Strange
- Past members: Jack Kirkner; Mark Oyarzabal; Justin Hanson
- Website: www.thetribalcommunity.com

Honeytribe is an American blues rock band formed in Saint Louis, Missouri. Its founder and bandleader is Devon Allman, son of Gregg Allman of the Allman Brothers Band, who is the lead guitarist, vocalist, and frontman. The other members are George Potsos on bass, and Gabriel Strange on drums In October 2012, Allman confirmed that Honeytribe was going on hiatus, while he continues to tour with Royal Southern Brotherhood and prepares for a tour to support his new solo album.

== History ==
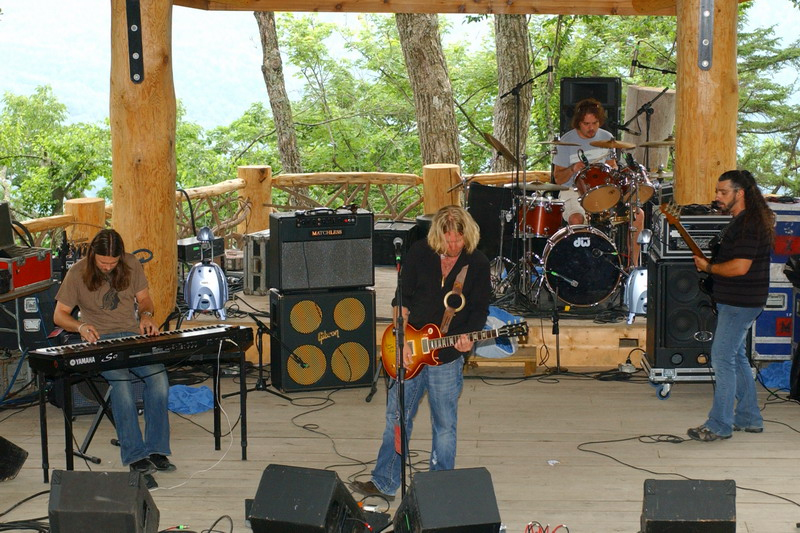
Honeytribe on stage

Honeytribe was formed by Devon Allman in 1999. In 2001, the band broke up so Allman could spend time with his newly born son. They reformed in 2005 and started Honeytribe's path as a career: making records and touring. They have toured throughout North America and Europe

=== Origin of band name ===
The name of the band is attributed to former member Marko (Mark Oyarzabal). According to Devon, one day the two of them were driving, and trying to think of names. They discussed how their dynamic sound could be super smooth and delicate, and also big, bad and fierce, and that they needed a name to reflect that dichotomy. Marko's first idea was "Honeytribe?", and Devon agreed with "Yeah! Sweet like honey, fierce like a tribe, it's perfect!"

== Discography ==
=== Torch ===
In 2006, the band released their debut album, Torch, to favorable reviews. The album was recorded at Ardent Studios in Memphis, Tennessee.

=== Space Age Blues ===
Space Age Blues is the second album by Devon Allman's Honeytribe. It was released in Europe on October 12, 2010, and in the US on October 25, 2010. In addition to the power-trio of Allman, Potsos and Strange, the album also contains appearances by Huey Lewis on harmonica and Ron Holloway on tenor saxophone.

== Members ==
- Devon Allman – guitar, vocals (1999–2001, 2005–present)
- George Potsos – bass guitar (1999–2001, 2005–2011)
- Gabriel Strange – drums (2008–2011)

=== Past members ===
- Mark Oyarzabal – drums (1999–2001, 2005–2008)
- Jack Kirkner – keyboards (1999–2001, 2005–2008)
- Justin Hanson – drums (2011–2012)
- Steve Duerst – bass guitar (2008–2009)
