= The Campbell Brothers =

American Sacred Steel gospel group

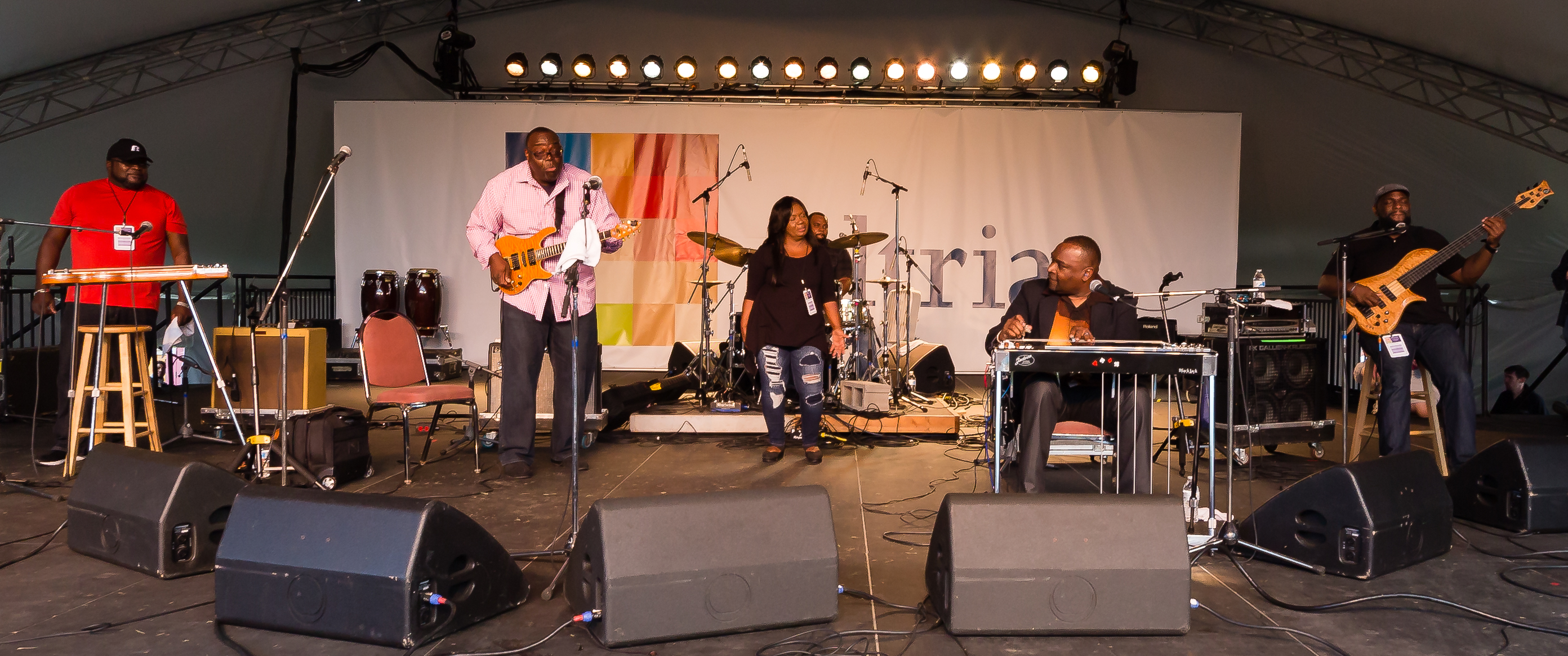
The Campbell Brothers at the 2015 Richmond Folk Festival

The Campbell Brothers are an American Sacred Steel gospel group from Rush, New York, composed of three brothers and one son.

The ensemble features prominent pedal steel guitar and began as the house band for a House of God Keith Dominion congregation. The pedal steel player, Chuck, uses his own tuning schema. The lap steel guitar was played by Chuck's brother, Darick Campbell. They released several albums on blues label Arhoolie Records in the late 1990s and early 2000s before signing with Ropeadope Records, releasing Can You Feel It? in 2005. The album reached No. 26 on the Billboard Top Gospel Albums chart. The group often features guest vocalists, including Denise Brown, Katie Jackson, and Malcolm Kirby.

== Members ==
- Chuck Campbell - pedal steel guitar
- Phillip Campbell - electric guitar, bass
- Carlton Campbell - drums
- Darick Campbell (1966-May 2020) - lap steel

== Discography ==
- Pass Me Not (Arhoolie Records, 1997)
- Sacred Steel On Tour! (Arhoolie Records, 2001)
- Sacred Steel for the Holidays (Arhoolie Records, 2001)
- Can You Feel It? (Ropeadope Records, 2005)
- Beyond The 4 Walls (APO Records, 2013)
- Innova (Ropeadope Records, 2024)
