= Hal Crook =

American jazz musician

Hal Crook (born 28 July 1950 in Providence, Rhode Island) is a jazz trombonist. He has a degree from the Berklee College of Music and is considered to be a leading teacher and author in the field of jazz improvisation.

Hal was a professor at Berklee College of Music for 30 years, and has played on over 40 recordings. Some of his notable students include Esperanza Spalding, Leo Genovese, Ryan Shore, Antonio Sanchez, Lionel Loueke, and Chris Cheek. Hal's composing and arranging credits include music for The Tonight Show Band, WDR Radio Band (Cologne), Phil Woods, Clark Terry, Herb Pomeroy, Louis Bellson, Artie Shaw, Duke Belaire, Dick Johnson, Nick Brignola, the New England Emmy Awards, and the San Diego Pops.

In Jazz 'Bones, Kurt Dietrich writes:

Following the course of Hal Crook's improvisations is a fascinating peek into an exceptional improvisational mind, not to mention an amazing trombonist. His playing is filled with technical marvels, but clearly not just for show. He works with modern techniques of building improvisations on various intervals, the development of motives, the use of pentatonic scales, and working in the outer reaches of harmony. His speed, range, fluency, sound and remarkable technique put him at the top echelon of players.

He is the author of seven textbooks on jazz improvisation, a novel (A Brief Madness), and a collection of short stories (Windborne Tales).

Though retired from Berklee, he continues to teach privately.

== Discography ==
- Hello Heaven (1982)
- Only Human (1993)
- Quartet Narayani with Joe Diorio (Ram 1994)
- Hero Worship (1997)
- Um: Stray Dog (2001)
- Creatures of Habit with Leo Genovese, Take Toriyama, and Thompson Kneeland
- Narayani with Joe Diorio, Steve LaSpina, and Steve Bagby
- Conjunction with Jerry Bergonzi
- Trio I with Dave Weigert and Yorai Oron
- Trio II with Dave Weigert and Hans Glawischnig
- Trio III with Dave Weigert and Hans Glawschnig
- Hello Heaven with Phil Woods, Bill Dobbins, Chuck Israels, and Bill Goodwin
- Creative Comping for Improvisation, Vol. I, II, III
