= The Lee Boys =

US musical group

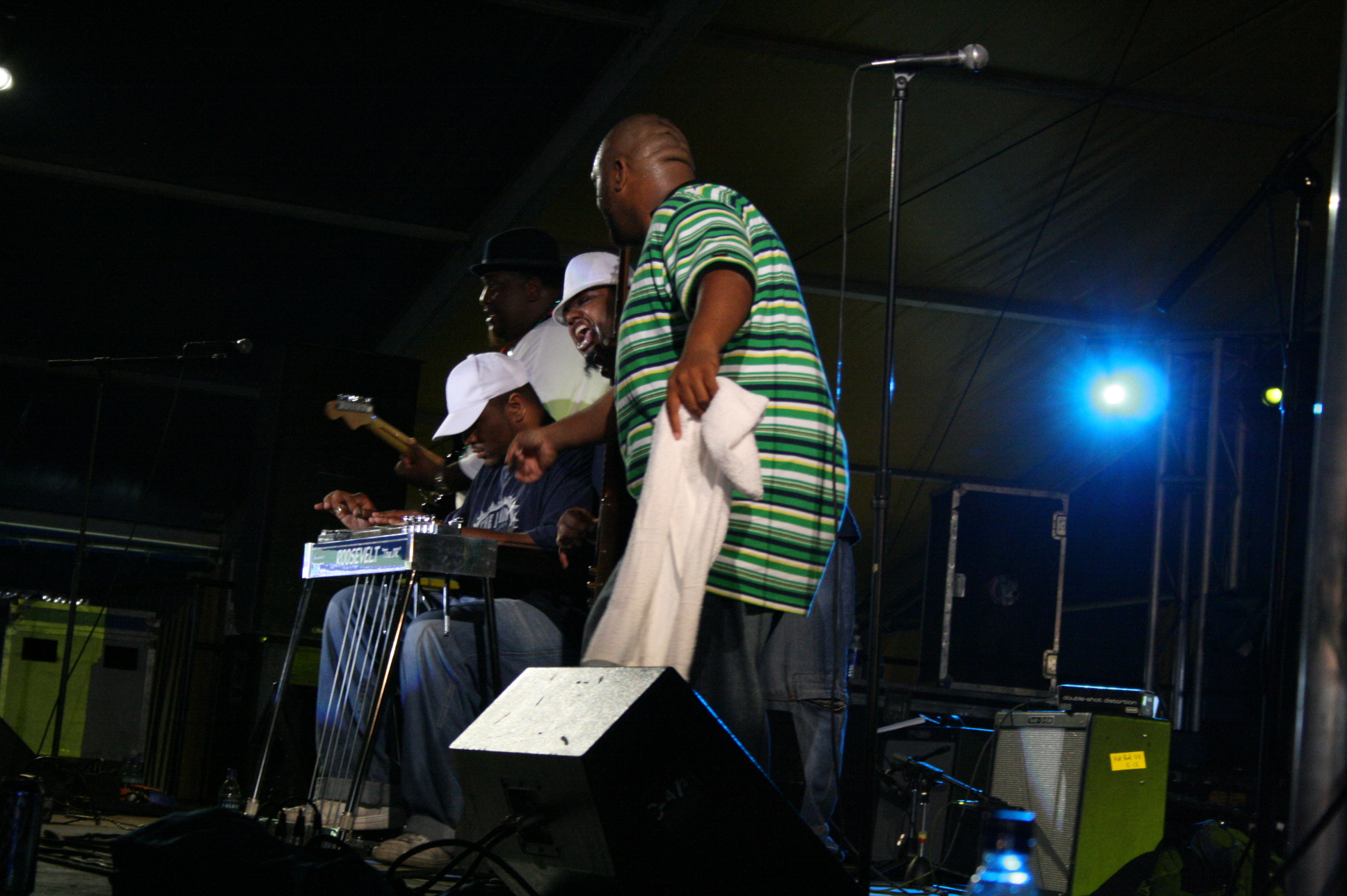
The Lee Boys performing at the Beale Street Music Festival in May 2007.

The Lee Boys are a funk and gospel band based out of Miami, Florida. The band plays in the Sacred Steel tradition that arose out of the musical stylings of the House of God Church. The band plays a mixture of funk music and gospel lyrics, staying true to their roots as a religious group. The band is similar in style to other House of God bands, such as Robert Randolph & the Family Band.

The band has played many notable shows and festivals, such as the New Orleans Jazz & Heritage Festival, Wakarusa Music and Camping Festival, Langerado, Chicago Blues Festival and Bonnaroo. After their 2006 performance at the event, the Chicago-Sun Times compared the band to Jimi Hendrix, saying:

"The Lee Boys, whose Church of God-inspired sacred steel music may be what Jimi Hendrix had in mind with his grand plan for ’electric sky church music.’ Part Robert Randolph, part Holmes Brothers, the Miami quintet sang the praises while whipping the crowd into a frenzy with hypnotic grooves, innovative pedal-steel/lead guitar interplay and funky rhythms."
