= Sacred Steel (musical tradition) =

Musical style and African-American gospel tradition

Sacred Steel is a musical style and African-American gospel tradition that features the steel guitar as part of religious services. The style developed in a group of related Pentecostal churches in the 1930s, and is associated in particular with some branches of the Church of the Living God.

The Church of the Living God was founded in 1903 by Mary Magdalena Lewis Tate. Following her death in 1930, the church divided into three branches, known as the Keith, Jewell and Lewis dominions. The steel guitar was embraced in the worship of two of these dominions, the Keith Dominion (officially known as The House of God Which Is the Church of the Living God the Pillar and Ground of the Truth Without Controversy), headquartered in Nashville, and the Jewell Dominion (officially known as Church of the Living God, Pillar and Ground of the Truth, Which He Purchased With His Own Blood, Inc.), headquartered in Indianapolis. Brothers Troman and Willie Eason introduced lap steel guitar to worship services in place of the traditional organ. This new instrument was met with great enthusiasm and taken up by others including the Bishop J.R. Lockley. The three toured together and later Willie put the new style down on record, recording a total of eighteen sides in the 1940s and 50s.

Since then, Sacred Steel has grown and flourished within the Keith and Jewell Dominions in churches in at least 22 states, including Alabama, Connecticut, Florida, Georgia, Indiana, Michigan, Mississippi, North Carolina, New Jersey, New York, South Carolina and Tennessee. Darick Campbell (1966–2020) was a lap steel player for the gospel band, the Campbell Brothers, who helped take the genre from Pentecostal churches to international fame. His older brother, Chuck Campbell, played pedal steel in the group. The Campbell Brothers' success in performing with rock groups such as the Allman Brothers was reproached by the House of God leaders and the Campbell Brothers were barred from performing at church services.

Perhaps the most widely-known practitioner is Robert Randolph of the Robert Randolph and the Family Band. Randolph, the son of a deacon and a minister, took up pedal steel guitar at 17. Just seven years later, he went on to become one of the most original and talented practitioners of the Sacred Steel form.

Willie Eason's nephew Aubrey Ghent had also become a celebrated steel guitarist, preserving the sacred steel tradition and bringing it to a wider audience. Ghent's father, Henry Nelson, was also schooled by Eason and played sacred steel for over 50 years, sharing the stage with Sister Rosetta Tharpe and Mahalia Jackson. Unlike Robert Randolph and the Family Band who have crossed over to doing more secular music, Aubrey Ghent has stayed closer to the gospel roots of tradition, as have many of the steel guitarists of the Jewell Dominion.

== Notable performers ==
- Maurice "Ted" Beard
- The Campbell Brothers
- Roosevelt Collier
- Calvin Cooke
- Aubrey Ghent
- A. J. Ghent son of Aubrey Ghent
- Bishop Lorenzo Harrison
- The Lee Boys
- Robert Randolph and the Family Band
- Sonny Treadway
