= Robert Randolph and the Family Band =

American gospel band

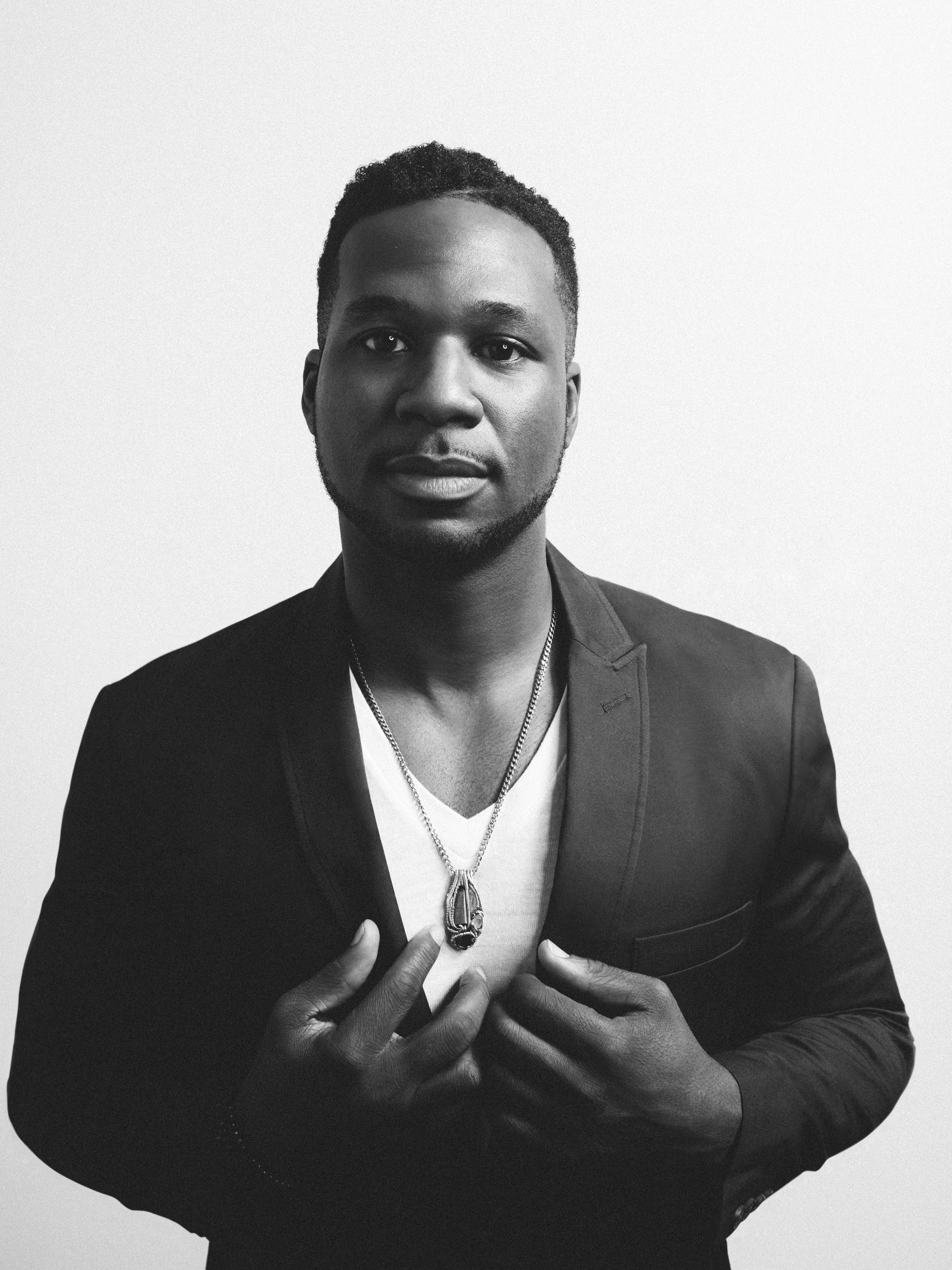
- Randolph in 2016

Background information
- Origin: Orange, New Jersey, U.S.
- Genres: R&B, sacred steel, funk, soul, jam, gospel, country, rock, blues
- Years active: 2001–present
- Labels: Warner, Blue Note, Sony Music, Provogue
- Members: Robert Randolph; Marcus Randolph; Lenesha Randolph; Brett Haas
- Past members: John Ginty; Jason Crosby; Danyel Morgan
- Website: www.robertrandolph.net

Robert Randolph and the Family Band is an American gospel band led by pedal steel guitarist Robert Randolph (Robert Jermaine Randolph, born August 8, 1977, Irvington, New Jersey). NPR has described the band as one with an "irresistible rock 'n' roll swagger". Rolling Stone included Randolph upon their list of the 100 greatest guitarists of all time. The band has released six studio albums and has been nominated for five Grammy Awards, winning the 2026 Award for Best Contemporary Blues Album for the album Preacher Kids.

== Band history ==
Frontman Robert Randolph was trained as a pedal steel guitarist in the House of God Church and makes prominent use of the instrument in the band's music. The instrument is referred to in many African-American Pentecostal churches as "sacred steel". Randolph was discovered while playing at a sacred steel convention in Florida.

The group's sound is inspired by funk bands such as Earth, Wind & Fire and Sly & the Family Stone. Randolph himself has explained that in his adolescent years before being discovered by the secular community, he was almost completely unaware of non-religious music. He went on to exclaim in an interview that "I grew up and saw a lot of older guys playing lap steels and pedal-steel guitars in my church. I had never heard of the Allman Brothers, or even Buddy Guy or Muddy Waters."

Before releasing albums with The Family Band, Randolph was selected by avant-garde jazz organist John Medeski to join him and the North Mississippi Allstars on their 2001 jam project, The Word. Just prior to the release of The Word's debut album, Randolph was brought to the attention of music fans through a review by Neil Strauss in The New York Times in April 2001. On their first non-church tour of the East Coast, Randolph's new Family Band opened for the North Mississippi Allstars and then rejoined the musicians after their set, with Medeski, as The Word.

The first Robert Randolph and the Family Band album, Live at the Wetlands, was released in 2002 on Family Band Records, recorded live on August 23, 2001, just prior to the club's closing. The band released their studio debut, Unclassified on August 5, 2003. They attracted the attention of Eric Clapton, and have subsequently toured as a supporting act with the English blues guitarist. Clapton later guested on their 2006 album Colorblind, playing on a cover of "Jesus Is Just Alright".

In 2002, they were hired by ABC to make the network's new NBA theme song. The song, "We Got Hoops", only appeared in three telecasts, though it was used throughout both the NBA and WNBA seasons during promotions for both leagues. In September 2003 Randolph was listed as No. 97 on Rolling Stone's 100 Greatest Guitarists of All Time list. Robert entered the list following Leigh Stephens and directly preceding Angus Young. In February 2004 Robert Randolph and the Family Band along with the band O.A.R. released a cover version of Led Zeppelin's "Fool in the Rain", which was made available for online purchase through iTunes. This version was played live with O.A.R. at their June 18, 2009, show at Charter One Pavilion in Chicago.

Their third album, Colorblind, was released October 10, 2006. The song "Ain't Nothing Wrong With That" was used in several commercials for NBC, and used in Katherine Jenkins and Mark Ballas' jive on Dancing with the Stars. In June 2008 the Discovery Channel used this same song in a popular promo entitled "It's All Good" for their summer lineup. The song "Thrill of It" was used throughout the 2007 college football season by ABC during their College Primetime games.

They worked with producer T-Bone Burnett on their fourth studio album We Walk This Road, released in 2010. They released the supposed first single from that album entitled "Get There" but this song did not appear on the album. The first official single from the album is "If I Had My Way." Randolph used his steel guitar with a wah-wah pedal

Their 2019 recording, Brighter Days, was chosen as a 'Favorite Blues Album' by AllMusic.

On March 28, 2025, Randolph announced his first solo album, Preacher Kids, set for release on June 27, 2025. The album won the Grammy Award for Best Contemporary Blues Album.

== Live appearances ==
Robert Randolph in Toronto

The band made its first television appearance on Late Show with David Letterman on August 5, 2003, performing "I Need More Love".

In 2004, Robert Randolph and the Family Band was the opening act on the Eric Clapton tour. They are featured prominently in the Clapton's Crossroads Guitar Festival DVD (2004). The band also appears on Bonnaroo Music Festival DVDs. The length of the concerts can vary greatly depending on what songs are played (the band does not use a set list) and how long jams last. Concerts go over the allotted time if the band and the audience are having fun. Most concerts don't have an intermission; instead, band members will exit the stage leaving one or two members a chance to shine with solos. The one time the band does stop is so the band can relax, get hydrated, and plan the encore. On October 9, 2004, Robert Randolph and the Family Band appeared on the PBS television show Austin City Limits.

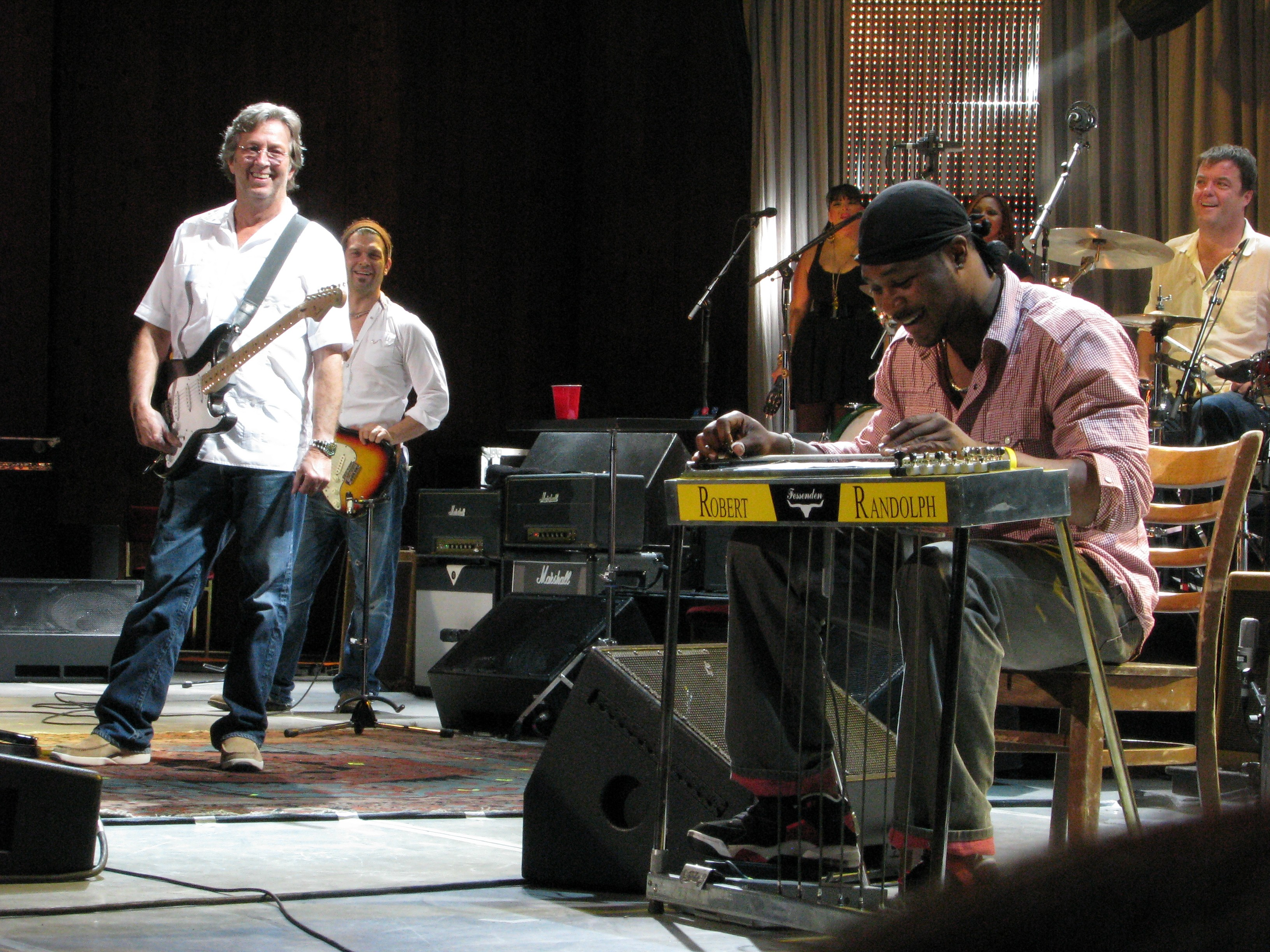
Robert Randolph, Doyle Bramhall II, and Eric Clapton performing "Got My Mojo Working" at Cuyahoga Falls, May 31, 2008

On January 24, 2007, they played in Dallas at Victory Plaza outside of the American Airlines Center as part of the 2007 NHL All Star game festivities. The band also played before the start of the 2007 NHL All-Star Game. The Family Band has opened for Dave Matthews Band for some shows on their 2002–09 tours. In 2005 Robert Randolph appeared on the Dave Matthews Band release Weekend on the Rocks. Robert Randolph has performed as a guest during the Dave Matthews Band set on songs such as "All Along the Watchtower", "Louisiana Bayou", "Stand Up", "Smooth Rider", "You Might Die Trying", and "Two Step", among others.

In 2007, Robert Randolph and the Family Band played at the inaugural South Padre International Music Festival. In 2008, they opened for Eric Clapton and were also one of four featured artists on the Music Builds Tour. Robert Randolph and the Family Band played in Oxford, Mississippi on April 25, 2009, as part of the 14th annual Double Decker Arts Festival. In 2009 Randolph also sat in on two live performances of Led Zeppelin's "Fool In The Rain" with the band O.A.R.

Also, on June 22, 2014, Robert Randolph and the Family Band played at the TD Toronto Jazz Fest, welcoming a new "cousin" Andrew Prince to the stage for two songs.

Robert Randolph and the Family Band played the 10th annual Rooster Walk Music and Arts Festival in May 2018.

On July 30, 2022, Robert Randolph and the Family Band opened for Zac Brown Band outside the Soaring Eagle Casino in Mt. Pleasant, Michigan.

== Accolades ==
=== Grammy Awards ===
Year	Nominee / work	Award	Result
2003	"Squeeze"	Best Rock Instrumental Performance	Nominated
2003	Unclassified	Best Rock Gospel Album	Nominated
2017	Got Soul	Best Contemporary Blues Album	Nominated
2020	Brighter Days	Best Contemporary Blues Album	Nominated
2026	Preacher Kids	Best Contemporary Blues Album	Won

== Discography ==
=== Studio albums ===
Year	Title	Peak chart positions				Label
Year	Title	US 200	US Rock	US Christian	US Blues	Label
2003	Unclassified	145		6		Warner Records
2006	Colorblind	75				Warner Records
2010	We Walk This Road	74	21	4		Warner Records
2013	Lickety Split	135	37			Blue Note Records
2017	Got Soul				2	Sony Music
2019	Brighter Days				3	Mascot Label Group / Provogue

=== Live albums ===
- Live at the Wetlands (2002)
- Live in Concert (2011)

=== Guest appearances on albums ===
- 2001: "Garden of Love" and "Opportunity" – Demolition String Band on Pulling Up Atlantis
- 2002: "Cissy Strut", "Ruler of My Heart" and "Tell It Like It Is" – Dirty Dozen Brass Band on Medicated Magic
- 2004: "Mas Y Mas" – Los Lobos on Live at the Fillmore (DVD version)
- 2004: "The Good Life" – Rachael Lampa on Rachael Lampa
- 2005: "Crosstown Traffic" – Soulive on Break Out
- 2005: "Exodus" and "Louisiana Bayou" – Dave Matthews Band on Complete Weekend on the Rocks
- 2005: "I Am an Illusion" – Rob Thomas on ...Something to Be
- 2005: "I Want to Take You Higher" – Sly & The Family Stone on Different Strokes by Different Folks
- 2005: "Lay Lady Lay" – Buddy Guy on Bring 'Em In
- 2005: "Mission Temple Fireworks Stand" – Sawyer Brown on Mission Temple Fireworks Stand
- 2005: "Oh My Lord" – Ringo Starr on Choose Love
- 2005: "Trinity" – Santana and Kirk Hammett of Metallica on All That I Am
- 2005: "Sympathy For The Devil" and "21st Century Schizoid Man" – Ozzy Osbourne on Under Cover
- 2008: "Otherside" – Third Day on Revelation
- 2008: "Out in the Woods" and "That's My Home" – Buddy Guy on Skin Deep
- 2008: "Train's a Comin'" – JD & the Straight Shot on Right on Time
- 2010: "There's No Tomorrow" – Elton John & Leon Russell on The Union
- 2011: "Straight Down the Line" – Robbie Robertson on How to Become Clairvoyant
- 2015: "Oh My Lord" - Randy Bachman on Heavy Blues
- 2024: "I Get Joy, Joy Reprise, Musicians Praise" - Cory Henry on Church
- 2025: Dylanology (Live) Joan Osborne featuring Robert Randolph
- 2026: "Never Make Your Move Too Soon" – Faye Carol on Faye Sings The Blues

=== Guest singles ===
Year	Single	Artist	Country Chart	Album
2004	"Mission Temple Fireworks Stand"	Sawyer Brown	55	Mission Temple Fireworks Stand

=== Guest appearances on soundtracks ===
- 2002: NBA on ABC – "We Got Hoops"
- 2004: ATV Offroad Fury 3 – "Squeeze"
- 2006: NBA Live 07 – "Thrill of It"
- 2007: Grey's Anatomy – "Ain't Nothing Wrong with That"
- 2007: Stomp the Yard – "Ain't Nothing Wrong with That"

=== Other appearances ===
In 1999, Arhoolie Records released Sacred Steel – Live! including performances recorded live in two House of God churches in 1998 and 1999, one of which was Robert Randolph performing "Without God". In 2001, they released Train Don't Leave Me: The 1st Annual Sacred Steel Convention including performances recorded live March 31–April 1, 2000, one of which was Robert Randolph performing "I Feel Like Pressing My Way". In 2002, they released Recorded Live At The 2nd Sacred Steel Convention including performances recorded live March 30–31, 2001, one of which was Robert Randolph performing "You've Got To Move". In 2004, Robert Randolph and the Family Band covered "Purple Haze" for the album Power of Soul: A Tribute to Jimi Hendrix. In 2009, Robert Randolph, along with The Clark Sisters, released a version of the song "Higher Ground" on the compilation album Oh Happy Day: An All-Star Music Celebration.

== Music videos ==
Year	Video	Director
2005	"Mission Temple Fireworks Stand" (w/ Sawyer Brown)	Shaun Silva
