= Friedrich Smend =

German Protestant theologian and librarian

- Born: 26 August 1893; Strasbourg
- Died: 10 February 1980 (aged 86); Berlin
- Education: University of Münster
- Occupations: Theologian; Librarian; Liturgist; Bach scholar
- Organizations: Preußische Staatsbibliothek; Kirchliche Hochschule Berlin
- Awards: Order of Merit of the Federal Republic of Germany

Friedrich Smend (26 August 1893 – 10 February 1980) was a German Protestant theologian and librarian at the Preußische Staatsbibliothek in Berlin, publishing a catalogue of the writings of Adolf von Harnack. He was a liturgist, teaching as professor at the Kirchliche Hochschule Berlin. His publications focus on the work of Johann Sebastian Bach and Johann Wolfgang von Goethe.

== Life ==
Born in Strasbourg, Smend belonged to a family of jurists and theologians. Members of three generations had served as pastors of the Reformed parish of Lengerich in the 18th and 19th centuries. His father Julius Smend was professor, first in Strasbourg, and then from 1918 first dean of the Protestant theological faculty of the University of Münster. His uncle was the theologian Rudolf Smend.

Smend studied Protestant theology in Münster, promoted to the doctorate. He worked as librarian of the Preußische Staatsbibliothek in Berlin from 1923, where he published a catalogue of the writings of Adolf von Harnack. During the Nazi regime, he was a member of the Bruderrat of the Bekennende Kirche and took part in the Kirchenkampf. After World War II, Smend was appointed prefessor of hymnology, liturgics and church music at the Kirchliche Hochschule Berlin, where he remained until retirement in 1958.

He was awarded honorary doctorates from the universities of Heidelberg and Mainz. In 1961, he received the Commanders Cross of the Order of Merit of the Federal Republic of Germany.

Smend focused on studies of the work of Johann Sebastian Bach and Johann Wolfgang von Goethe, specifically Bach's Mass in B minor, St Matthew Passion and St John Passion, as well as number symbolism in Bach's works.

He died in Berlin at age 86.

== Publications ==
- Adolf von Harnack. Verzeichnis seiner Schriften. Leipzig 1927; Nachtrag 1927-1930. Leipzig 1931 (reprinted: Adolf von Harnack. Verzeichnis seiner Schriften bis 1930. Mit einem Geleitwort und bibliographischen Nachträgen bis 1985 von Jürgen Dummer. Saur, Munich 1990, ISBN 3-598-10321-2).
- Joh. Seb. Bach Kirchen-Kantaten. in 6 volumes. Christlicher Zeitschriftenverlag, Berlin 1947–48 (2nd edition 1950; 3rd edition 1966).
- Johann Sebastian Bach bei seinem Namen gerufen. Bärenreiter, Kassel 1950.
- Bach in Köthen. Christlicher Zeitschriftenverlag, Berlin 1951–52 (in English: St. Louis, Concordia Publishing House, 1985).
- Goethes Verhältnis zu Bach. Merseburger Verlag, Berlin 1955.
- Missa; Symbolum Nicenum; Sanctus; Osanna, Benedictus, Agnus Dei et Dona Nobis Pacem (später genannt „Messe in h-moll“). Bärenreiter, Kassel 1956.
- Ferner Freunde ward gedacht : ein Beitrag zu Goethes Briefwechsel mit Marianne von Willemer. Berlin, Merseburger, 1964
- Bach-Studien. Gesammelte Reden und Aufsätze. Bärenreiter, Kassel 1969.
