= Truly Madly Deeply =

Truly Madly Deeply may refer to:

- Truly, Madly, Deeply (film), a 1990 British film
- Truly Madly Deeply – Ultra Rare Tracks, a 1998 compilation album by Savage Garden
- "Truly Madly Deeply" (song), a 1997 song by Savage Garden
- "Truly Madly Deeply", a 2012 song by One Direction on the album Take Me Home
- "Truly Madly Deeply", a 2005 song by The Dualers
- Truly Madly Deeply (novel), a 2010 novel by Faraaz Kazi
