= Whitney Shay =

American singer-songwriter

- Born: September 16; La Mesa, California, United States
- Origin: San Diego, California, U.S.
- Genres: Blues, soul, rhythm and blues
- Occupations: Singer, songwriter
- Instrument: Vocals
- Years active: 2010s–present
- Label: Various including Ruf Records
- Website: Official website

Whitney Shay (born September 16) is an American blues, soul, and R&B singer and songwriter. To date, Shay has released three albums including her 2012 debut issue, Soul Tonic.

She has won four San Diego Music Awards, including 'Best Artist of the Year' in 2019. Shay has cited Etta James as her biggest influence, although particularly admired the 1950s singers such as Big Mama Thornton, Big Maybelle, Ruth Brown, LaVerne Baker and Helen Humes. Her songs have been used on television and in film, including the syndicated NBC TV show, Timeless, and on cable networks such as HBO, Bravo, and BET, plus in Tyler Perry's A Madea Family Funeral.

== Life and career ==
Although subsequently based in San Diego, Shay was born in La Mesa, California, United States. Shay grew up near Alpine, California, on her parents ranch, surrounded by Clydesdale horses. At the age of three, accompanied by her mother and grandmother, she travelled to Europe and saw the Royal Shakespeare Company performing The Wizard of Oz, and when asked by her mother, Shay replied "Well, I liked it, but I thought I was going to be on stage." Upon their return to the U.S. she was enrolled in a theater company, with the family giving her encouragement to theatrical ambition plus dance and voice lessons. During her youth, Shay listened to the radio and particularly blues and soul records. Shay was mainly raised by her mother and grandmother; her stepfather assisted Shay in this regard in her teenage years. Her family relocated to the Japatul Valley near Jamul, California, while Shay was in high school. At school she joined a number of her classmates and performed songs in the style of the Andrews Sisters, helping her to assess delivery of songs from the Great American Songbook. Influenced primarily by Etta James, she then graduated more towards soul and blues music. In college, Shay studied theater, being particularly interested in dance in a theater setting, and to his day still has ambitions to act as well as sing. Following her graduation from San Diego State University in 2008, and by now based in San Diego, she formed a band that briefly played at local venues. In 2009, Shay moved away from theatrical production ambitions to front her own band and develop her stage craft. Shay grew to admire the 1950s singers such as Big Mama Thornton, Big Maybelle, Ruth Brown, LaVerne Baker and Helen Humes.

In 2012, Shay was offered the opportunity to record her debut album with record producer Archie Thompson, at Stat Records Studio. The album, Soul Tonic, contained 12 tracks, some of them cover versions of vintage blues, soul and R&B tracks. These included the Isaac Hayes and David Porter penned, "Your Good Thing (Is About to End)" and Etta James' song, "Can't Shake It." Following the release of the album, Shay toured extensively in the United States and Brazil, including performances at music festivals and on radio and television. In 2015, she sang backing vocals with Candye Kane and Nina Anderson on James Harman's album, Bonetime. Shay noted "I've done lots of weird things in my career... I jumped out of a cake, I got hired to sing 'Happy Birthday' and jump out of a cake. I've done a couple of jazz gigs at Asian grocery stores."

In 2017, she was voted the Blues Artist of the Year at the San Diego Music Awards. Shay signed a single-album contract with the Little Village Foundation, who issued her second album, A Woman Rules the World. It was produced by Kid Andersen. Blues Matters stated that Shay was "a future blues icon", while Elmore Magazine described her as "the epitome of a rising star." The album appeared listed in various publications, including Top Albums of the Year in Blues Music, in France's Soul Bag, and in Norway's and Germany's Bluesnews magazine. A Woman Rules the World, Shay's first new album in six years, was also the first to include some of her own penned songs, co-written with her musical partner, Adam J. Eros. In addition, the album incorporated Shay's reworking of tracks previously recorded by Little Richard and Dinah Washington.

Shay has variously worked in different musical combinations including Shay & the Hustle, the Whitney Shay Quartet, Whitney Shay & Robin Henkel, and the JazzKatz Orchestra, in addition to fronting the blues/R&B group Whitney Shay & the Shakedowns. Shay was a 2019 Blues Music Award nominee, and collected the Best Blues Album and Artist of the Year titles at the 2019 San Diego Music Awards. After this event, she undertook another a tour in Brazil. Shay then played at her first European festival, where she was backed by the Michael Zito Big Blues Band, which featured B. B. King's former horn section.

In 2019, Shay signed a new recording contract with the German record label, Ruf Records. Her third album, Stand Up, was produced and arranged by Mark "Kaz" Kazanoff at the Wire Recording Studio in Austin, Texas. The personnel who played on the album included the guitarist Laura Chavez, and drummer Tommy Taylor, and featured guest musicians such as Guy Forsyth, Derek "Big House" O'Brien, and Marcia Ball. Stand Up was issued in February 2020, and debuted on the Billboard Blues Albums Chart at number one. The album primarily had compositions written by Shay and Eros, and expanded on more personal issues. "Someone You Never Got to Know" was a track about dealing with the loss of someone Shay never knew; her birth father. Apart from ten original songs, Shay also included her versions of "Tell The Truth", written by the 5 Royales member, Lowman Pauling, and "I Never Meant to Love Him", penned by Ronald Clyde Carlson and Terri McFaddin, and originally recorded by Etta James. Shay was due to support her album on Ruf's annual Blues Caravan tour with Ryan Perry and Jeremiah Johnson, before the COVID-19 pandemic scuppered everyone's plans.

Normally performing around 200 concerts per year, Shay's schedule in 2019 and early 2020 incorporated dates in Brazil, Russia, Germany, France, Belgium, Sweden, Finland and Spain. In addition, Shay had previously appeared at the Doheny Blues Festival, the Gator by the Bay Festival, and the San Diego Blues Festival.

Her songs have been used on television and in film, including the syndicated NBC TV show, Timeless, and on cable networks such as HBO, Bravo, and BET, plus in Tyler Perry's A Madea Family Funeral.

== Discography ==
=== Albums ===
Year	Title	Record label
2012	Soul Tonic	Self-released
2018	A Women Rules The World	Little Village Foundation
2020	Stand Up	Ruf Records

=== EPs ===
- Jam in the Van featuring Whitney Shay : Jam in the Van (2021)

== See also ==
- List of electric blues musicians
