= Smend =

Smend is a surname. Notable people with the surname include:

- Günther Smend (1912–1944), Second World War German Army officer involved in the 20 July Plot to assassinate Adolf Hitler
- Julius Smend (1857–1930), German theologian, brother of Rudolf Smend
- Rudolf Smend (1851–1913), German theologian
