= Big Daddy Wilson =

American electric and soul blues singer and songwriter

- Born: Adam Wilson Blount; August 19, 1960 (age 65); Edenton, North Carolina, United States
- Genres: Electric blues, soul blues
- Occupation(s): Singer, songwriter
- Instrument: Vocals
- Years active: 1990s–present
- Labels: Ruf Records
- Website: bigdaddywilson.com

Big Daddy Wilson (born Adam Wilson Blount, August 19, 1960) is an American electric and soul blues singer and songwriter. Most of his solo recordings have been released by the German record label, Ruf Records. To date, Wilson has appeared on more than a dozen albums.

Wilson has lived in Germany for almost thirty years.

== Life and career ==
The son of John Henry Wilson and Dorothy Lee Blount, Adam Wilson Blount was born in Edenton, North Carolina, United States. A shy boy, he was raised by his mother and grandmother, and worked in the cotton and tobacco plantations during his childhood and most of his teenage years. Wilson sang in his local church choir, and gospel and country music from a local radio station was the only music he heard during that time. He left school aged 16 and two years later enrolled in the United States Army in 1979, mainly due to job prospects being scarce where he lived. Wilson was stationed in military bases in Germany, and he quickly became homesick. Using the ruse of pretending he was due to be married, the Army sent him back to the United States for a fortnight. Wilson remained for six weeks before his mother urged him to return to the military, which saw him promptly posted back to Germany. In his leisure time, Wilson attended a blues concert and the experience changed his life. He had been writing poems in his spare time, and following an honorable discharge from military service, he remained in Germany and tried to fuse his lyrical ability and singing voice, a rich, warm, low baritone. Using the blues as his base, and inspired by other American blues musicians who had found success in Europe, Wilson overcame his shyness and began singing at venues in his adopted home. Finding acceptance, Wilson travelled further afield finding opportunities across the Continent. After a while Wilson met a German girl, whom he married and wrote a poem about his wife, which became the first solo song he recorded.

After five years of working on stage, the Hungarian record label, Crossroad Records, teamed Wilson with another Hungarian product, the Mississippi Grave Diggers (a blues band) to record his first album, Get on Your Knees and Pray. It found some success, being played by radio stations and at military bases in Europe and Asia. His follow up occurred the same year, when he teamed with Doc Fozz (Wolfgang Feld) on My Day Will Come. Wilson used the two albums to spur him on, working on stage and at music festivals, as his fan base began to grow. Some years ago, Big Daddy Wilson informed his interviewer that the reason he wears sunglasses on stage, is down to his shy nature. Another collaboration with Doc Fozz, saw Doin' It Right being released in 2007. He signed to the German record label, Ruf Records in 2009, which gave him an international breakthrough album with Love Is the Key, which elevated his presence. He recorded with a small backing ensemble, often acoustically managed, and sang his own material. His friend Eric Bibb guested on two songs, "Country Boy" and "Walk a Mile in My Shoes". Thumb a Ride was the next release in 2011. Live in Luxembourg at L'inoui (2013) was a live recording, which was sandwiched between two collections released by the French-based DixieFrog label. These were I'm Your Man and Time. I'm Your Man was issued in April 2013 and included his own compositions, along with the Eric Bibb penned "Hold The Ladder". Time came out in April 2015, and moved between acoustic and electric soul blues numbers. It was jointly produced by Big Daddy Wilson, Eric Bibb and Staffan Astner; all of whom co-wrote most of the songs. In 2013, Wilson performed at the Paris Jazz Festival. Wilson noted, as his confidence on stage grew, "My sister came all the way to see me perform and she couldn't believe it. No, that's not my brother. It seems like all my shyness was gone – thanks to my music."

Wilson was a featured artist on the Kai Strauss album, Getting Personal, which was released in January 2017. Wilson's next album, Neckbone Stew (2017), released by Ruf, appeared in blues charts across the globe, which let Wilson appear at some of the most prestigious blues and jazz festivals. His now almost constant touring was combined by Ruf Records, to allow a collaboration with Vanessa Collier and Si Cranstoun for the live recording, Blues Caravan 2017. "Unchain My Heart", "Bring It On Home to Me", and "Twistin' the Night Away" were standards covered on the Blues Caravan 2017 album. Wilson sang solo on the tracks "Cross Creek Road" and "Walk a Mile in My Shoes". Despite the album's title, it was released in 2018. In addition, Wilson recorded his own live offering, Songs from the Road, which was jointly issued as a DVD and CD.

His global touring included dates in Australia, which incorporated a performance at The Blues on Broadbeach Festival. This exposure saw some of Wilson's recordings being released in Australia on ABC Music.

In mid-2018, Wilson entered an American recording studio for the first time, to undertake pre-production work, in conjunction with record producer Jim Gaines, guitarist Laura Chavez, plus bassist Dave Smith. Further recording work took place the FAME Studios in Muscle Shoals, Alabama. The album contained 12 tracks of which ten were written by Wilson. Deep in My Soul was released on April 19, 2019.

Wilson was a guest on the Greg Copeland album, Brown-Eyed Handsome Man, issued in 2020.

== Discography ==
=== Solo albums ===
Year	Title	Record label(s)
2009	Love Is the Key	Ruf Records
2011	Thumb a Ride	Ruf Records
2013	I'm Your Man	DixieFrog Records
2013	Live in Luxembourg at L'Inouï	Phamosa Records
2015	Time	DixieFrog Records
2017	Neckbone Stew	Ruf Records
2018	Songs from the Road	Ruf Records
2019	Deep in My Soul	Ruf Records
2021	Hard Time Blues	Continental Blue Heaven

=== Collaboration albums ===
Year	Title	Record label(s)	Credited to
2004	Get on Your Knees and Pray	Crossroads Records	Big Daddy Wilson & Mississippi Grave Diggers
2004	My Day Will Come	Crossroads Records	Big Daddy Wilson & Doc Fozz
2007	Doin' It Right	New Music Distribution	Big Daddy Wilson & Doc Fozz
2018	Blues Caravan 2017	Ruf Records	Big Daddy Wilson, Vanessa Collier, Si Cranstoun
2021	Pay Day	Juno Records	Big Daddy Wilson & Hans Theesssink
2023	Plan B	Continental Blue Heaven	Big Daddy Wilson & the Goosebumps Bros.

== See also ==
- List of electric blues musicians
- List of soul-blues musicians
