= Layla Zoe =

- Born: Nanaimo, British Columbia, Canada
- Genres: Blues, blues rock
- Occupation: Singer-songwriter
- Instrument: Vocals
- Years active: 2000s–present
- Labels: Cable Car Records, Ruf Records
- Website: https://www.layla.ca/

Layla Zoe is a Canadian blues and blues rock singer-songwriter. Since 2006 she has released a number of albums, both studio and live recordings, and has performed across North America and most of Western Europe. Zoe has been influenced by Frank Zappa, Tom Waits, Neil Young, Muddy Waters and Janis Joplin. Her vocal style has been likened to Joplin by various journalists and commentators. Although hailing from British Columbia, Canada, she has resided in various parts of Europe in recent years.

== Career ==
She was born in Nanaimo, British Columbia, Canada. By the age of four she was singing accompanied by her father's guitar playing; duly inspired by hearing his blues record collection, Zoe went on to front his band ten years later. Zoe sang in school musical productions and, by the early 1990s, publicly read poetry on Commercial Drive, Vancouver. By her late teenage years, Zoe sang with another blues band, and then relocated to Toronto.

She issued an EP, You Will, in 2005, followed by her debut album, Shades of Blue (2006). Hoochie Coochie Woman (2007) featured her versions of other blues musicians songs, with some original numbers Zoe co-wrote with her then-guitarist, Chris Raines. This exposure provided more opportunities for Zoe who won the best vocalist award at the Vancouver Island Music Awards, performed with Jeff Healey in the latter's club in Toronto, and triumphed in a blues song writing competition in Finland. Her next album, The Firegirl, was released in 2008, which Zoe self-produced. The same year she performed at the Grolsch Blues Festival in Germany, where the backing band included Henrik Freischlader. She was subsequently invited in 2010 by Freischlader to join his own record label, Cable Car Records, which led to collaborations on three albums Sleep Little Girl (2011), The Lily (2013) and Live at Spirit of 66 (2015). The Lily was noted by the American magazine, DownBeat as one of their "top albums of the year", whilst the latter recording was a double live album release.

In 2016, she signed a new recording contract with Ruf Records. This resulted in two separate outcomes. Zoe toured the United States as a featured artist with Ruf's "Blues Caravan", alongside Tasha Taylor and Ina Forsman. The resultant live album, Blues Caravan 2016, ensued. In addition, Zoe issued her own Breaking Free collection the same year, which was produced by her guitarist Jan Laacks and featured a guest appearance from Sonny Landreth. Zoe won "Best Vocalist of 2016" at the European Blues Awards. Her powerhouse voice was compared to that of Janis Joplin.

By 2013, Zoe had already relocated to live in Germany, to coincide with more touring obligations in Europe. Around this time she stated "For me the blues is about expressing pain, but with a feeling of hope at the end. Blues music is bringing out emotions. It is very rough and honest. The best blues brings out feelings that people need to get in touch with". In 2017, she issued a live CD/DVD billed, Songs from the Road, which had been recorded in Nuremberg, Germany. The following year, Zoe performed at the Mahindra Blues Festival in Mumbai, India, with John Mayall, Coco Montoya and Walter "Wolfman" Washington on the same bill.

In 2018, Zoe turned to crowdfunding to finance her next release, Gemini, a double album. The album had two distinct sides; with an acoustic CD entitled 'Fragile', while the up tempo electric blues other disc was named 'Courage'. Jan Laacks again played a major role in recording, which took place in his studio in Bad Godesberg. After a tour promoting that album, Zoe enlisted new band members to look back at her work and produce Retrospective Tour 2019. The double live album featured Krissy Matthews on guitar. Another collection, Nowhere Left to Go was remotely recorded during the constraints of dealing with the COVID-19 pandemic in Europe, working with several other songwriters across the globe. These included the American Jackie Venson and Canadians Suzie Vinnick and Brandi Disterheft.

Zoe has also since relocated to the Netherlands.

== Discography ==
=== Albums ===
Year	Title	Record label	Billed as
2006	Shades of Blue	Self-released	
2007	Hoochie Coochie Woman	Self-released	
2008	The Firegirl	Self-released	
2008	Live at Errington Hall	Self-released	
2011	Sleep Little Girl	Cable Car Records	
2013	The Lily	Cable Car Records	
2015	Live at Spirit Of 66	Cable Car Records	
2016	Blues Caravan 2016	Ruf Records	Featuring Layla Zoe, Tasha Taylor and Ina Forsman
2016	Breaking Free	Ruf Records	
2017	Songs from the Road	Ruf Records	
2018	Gemini	Self-released	
2020	Nowhere Left To Go	Self-released	
2020	Retrospective Tour 2019	Self-released	
2022	The World Could Change	Cable Car Records	
2023	Back to the Spirit Of 66	Self-released	
