= Kai Strauss =

- Born: 15 May 1970 (age 54); Lengerich, Westphalia, Germany
- Genres: Electric blues
- Occupation(s): Singer, guitarist, songwriter
- Instrument(s): Guitar, vocals
- Years active: 1990s–present
- Website: Official website

Kai Strauss (born 15 May 1970) is a German electric blues singer, guitarist, and songwriter. He is a multiple winner of the German Blues Award and regularly tours with his band, Kai Strauss & The Electric Blues All Stars. Strauss has been involved in the release of seven albums since 2014.

== Life and career ==
He was born in Lengerich, Westphalia, Germany, and grew up in Osnabrück. As a teenager in the 1980s, he developed a passion for the work of Albert King, Buddy Guy, Jimmie Vaughan and Stevie Ray Vaughan, through listening to his parents' record collection. Strauss later fuelled his desire by participating in various local blues jam nights. From the mid 1990s, Strauss formed the Bluecasters, who performed all over Europe with the Texan harmonicist Memo Gonzalez. By 2010, Strauss performed under his own name and, in 2014, released his debut album, Electric Blues. The recording featured Keith Dunn (harmonica, vocals), Sugar Ray Norcia (vocals) and Darrell Nulisch (harmonica, vocals), whilst Strauss played guitar and sang plus undertook production duties. Electric Blues contained the track "Home in My Heart", written by Winfield Scott and Otis Blackwell, and originally recorded by Solomon Burke.

His next album, I Go By Feel was issued on Continental Blue Heaven in 2015. Tommie Harris sang vocals on two of the album's numbers, "Luther's Blues" and "Soul Fixin' Man". Getting Personal, which was released in January 2017, saw guest musician Big Daddy Wilson (vocals) feature on one of the tracks. By this time, Bruce Iglauer founder of Alligator Records stated, on hearing the work of Strauss, "Excellent playing, with a lot of maturity and emotions".

In 2018, Strauss was involved in the issuing of two albums. Alabama Hambone was credited to Tommie Harris With The R&B Caravan Feat. Kai Strauss. Whilst The Blues Is Handmade was a compilation album issued by Continental Blue Heaven. His next album, credited to Kai Strauss & The Electric Blues Allstars, was the live recording, Live In Concert. One reviewer noted "His repertoire on this CD sounds as if it came from Theresa's Lounge in Chicago, 1967". Otis Grand opined "Clearly, real blues is embedded in Kai’s skull, and I think he finally did it and is steering himself fittingly". The magazine, Blues Matters!, in its number 108 issue in 2019 noted, "This is high energy top quality electric blues as it should be, from the heart and with punches of feelings and emotions. Hard to believe this man is a blues player from Germany and not from Chicago or Memphis".

In 2022, and by now entering his sixth decade, Strauss issued In My Prime. Most of the tracks were written, or co-written by Strauss, although it included a version of "Down on Bended Knee", as originally recorded by Johnny Copeland from Copeland Special (1981). Unusually, the horn section on In My Prime was recorded in the United States, with the bulk of the other recording taking place in Germany in July 2020.

Strauss had concerts in 2023, which included a date in January at the Stadstheater Blues Festival alongside Giles Robson, Sugar Queen, Big Bo and Little Steven, and a short joint tour with Tony Vega throughout March.

== Discography ==
=== Albums ===
Year	Title	Record label	Additional credits
2014	Electric Blues	Continental Record Services	
2015	I Go By Feel	Continental Blue Heaven	
2017	Getting Personal	Continental Blue Heaven	
2018	Alabama Hambone	Styx Records	Tommie Harris With The R&B Caravan Feat. Kai Strauss
2018	The Blues Is Handmade (compilation album)	Continental Blue Heaven	
2019	Live in Concert (live album)	Continental Blue Heaven	Kai Strauss & The Electric Blues All Stars
2020	In My Prime	Continental Blue Heaven	
