= Casey Hensley =

American singer-songwriter

- Born: Los Gatos, California, United States
- Genres: Blues, swing, rock and roll
- Occupations: Singer, songwriter, record producer
- Instrument: Vocals
- Years active: 2010s–present
- Labels: VizzTone Records
- Website: Official website

Casey Hensley is an American female blues, swing, and rock and roll singer, songwriter and record producer. To date, Hensley has released two albums including her 2017 debut issue, Live.

The Los Angeles Times described Hensley as a "rising star". She was named 'Best Blues Artist' at the 2019 San Diego Music Awards. Her work includes a mixture of Chicago and jump blues, plus swing and rock and roll. Hensley is a distant relative of the late Patsy Cline.

== Life and career ==
Hensley was born in Los Gatos, California, United States, before relocating with her family to San Diego. Hensley grew up listening to Etta James, Aretha Franklin, Ella Fitzgerald, Janis Joplin, Otis Redding, Ray Charles, The Allman Brothers, Led Zeppelin, The Temptations and Freddie Mercury among others. She first performed on stage at the age of five. Hensley recalled "It was funny, I was up on stage and my parents said, 'Ok, make sure you move when you're on stage.' And there's a video of me just swaying back and forth... making the crowd seasick". By the age of eight, Hensley had recorded her self-penned song, "I Wish". Around this time, the family moved to Huntington Beach, California, and Hensley got involved in acting for around five years. She performed in independent films and undertook Disney shows. Hensley later did some movie trailer and film studio work, starting to use her background in music and acting. Hensley formed and fronted a band called Chasing Norman, before deciding in her early twenties to branch out as a solo performer.

Hensley met Candye Kane in 2009, and through her connected with Kane's former husband, Thomas Yearsley, the bassist in the Paladins. He owned a recording studio and needed backing singers for one of his songs, and Hensley and Kane sang together on the recording. Becoming based in San Diego again, Hensley started to find potential bandmates when attending blues jams in the region. Hensley stated "I couldn't believe how the blues community just accepted me with open arms". Through the same jamming route they found the guitarist Laura Chavez, building a band around them and started playing gigs, playing a mixture of Hensley penned tracks interspersed with covers of blues standards. Chavez had started playing professionally at the age of 14, and in 2013 played guitar on and co-produced Kane's final studio album, Coming Out Swingin'. Hensley also sang at several shows that celebrated Kane's life, after Kane died from pancreatic cancer in May that year.

Hensley contacted VizzTone Records, and Her debut album, Live, was recorded in one continuous take in the recording studio, in front of an invited audience. Among the tracks recorded were covers of Big Mama Thornton's "Ball and Chain", Screamin' Jay Hawkins "I Put a Spell on You", the Irma Thomas number, "You Can Have My Husband", Koko Taylor's "Voodoo Woman", the Willie Dixon penned "I Just Want to Make Love to You", and Elvis Presley's "Hard Headed Woman", plus three original songs written by Hensley. The personnel included Hensley (vocals); with Chavez on guitar; drummer and, by now, life partner, Evan Caleb Yearsley; plus saxophonist Johnny Viau; and bassist Marcos C. It was recorded at Thomas Yearsley's Thunderbird Analog Recording Studios in Oceanside. Live was issued in October 2017. The album saw Hensley receiving nominations for several San Diego Music Awards. In the same year, Hensley and her backing ensemble played at the Ojai Blues Festival, appeared at Gator by the Bay and the Doheny Blues Fest, and they performed at the Big Blues Bender at the Plaza Hotel & Casino, in Las Vegas, Nevada.

She was named 'Best Blues Artist' at the 2019 San Diego Music Awards.

Her sophomore release, Good as Gone, was released in March 2020. It was co-produced by Hensley and Chavez, who both featured along with Yearsley on drums, Marcos C. on bass, and Jonny Viau and Steven Ebner on horns. Containing music that was a mixture of genres including Chicago and jump blues, plus swing and rock and roll, it was recorded at the Grease Punk Studio in Lakeside, California. All nine tracks were written by Hensley, and the collection was co-produced by Hensley and Chavez.

== Discography ==
=== Albums ===
| Year | Title | Record label |
|---|---|---|
| 2017 | Live | VizzTone Records |
| 2020 | Good as Gone | VizzTone Records |

== See also ==
- List of electric blues musicians
