= Laura Chavez =

American songwriter

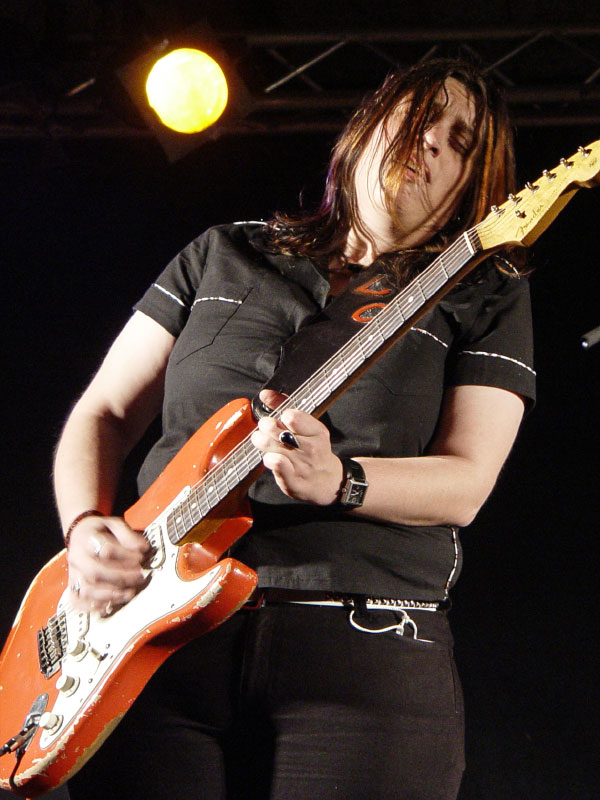
- Blues Heaven Festival (2018, Denmark)

Background information
- Born: Laura Catherine Chavez; April 3, 1982 (age 44); Mountain View, California, U.S.
- Genres: Blues; soul; rhythm and blues
- Occupations: Guitarist; songwriter; record producer
- Instrument: Guitar
- Years active: 2000–present
- Labels: Various including Ruf Records and Delta Groove Productions

Laura Catherine Chavez (born April 3, 1982) is an American blues, soul, and rhythm and blues guitarist, songwriter and record producer. She has worked with many other musicians, including Deborah Coleman, Candye Kane, Dani Wilde, The Mannish Boys, Mike Ledbetter, Monster Mike Welch, Vanessa Collier, Casey Hensley and Whitney Shay. Her playing style is based in the Texas and Chicago blues traditions, both classic and modern genres.

In 2021, she was nominated at the 42nd Blues Music Awards in the category 'Instrumentalist - Guitar'. This was her second such nomination, as Chavez had been listed two years earlier in the same category. In 2023, Chavez finally triumphed in the same category 'Instrumentalist - Guitar'.

== Life and career ==
Chavez was born and raised in Mountain View, California, United States. She grew up with her older brother Matthew and parents, Tony and Catherine Chavez. Her mother played the piano for her own enjoyment, and this initially helped draw Laura towards music. Listening to her brother playing recordings by Led Zeppelin and Jimi Hendrix, inspired her, at the age of six or seven, to ask her mother if she could have lessons in guitar playing. She started lessons but did not like her teacher's approach and would hide when he arrived to give her tuition. This led her mother to cancel the arrangement, and Laura did not play the instrument again until she was in her early teenage years. She found another teacher based in Palo Alto, California, and with her parents buying her an Ibanez electric guitar, she restarted her musical education. However, Chavez did not start playing in a professional capacity, until she had graduated from high school. Chavez met Lara Price at the first blues jam session she went to at JJ's Blues in San Jose, California. She was aged 18 and too young to attend but, after a hesitant beginning, she went every week and became the guitarist for the house band at the jam, and ended up playing professionally alongside Price for eight years. They undertook national tours, and played at the International Blues Challenge in Memphis, Tennessee. The group recorded two studio albums, before Chavez and Price waxed an acoustic duo album.

In 2008, Candye Kane was looking for a lead guitarist, and enquired of her friend Sue Foley for recommendations. Foley instantly endorsed Chavez's qualities, with Kane taking Foley's word for it, without actually hearing Chavez play a note. The pair soon became both musical colleagues and friends. The same year, Chavez played guitar on the recording, Blues Caravan: Guitars & Feathers, alongside Kane, Deborah Coleman and Dani Wilde. Chavez went on to play with Kane on Superhero (2009), being both lead guitarist and co-producer. Chavez became the musical director for Kane's band, and performed on Sister Vagabond (2011), where the album billing credited "featuring Laura Chavez." The same styling was used on the cover of the 2013 collection, Come Out Swingin'. It was their final recording together before Kane died of cancer in May 2016. Chavez spent six months mourning the loss before she recommenced playing the guitar. Of their time together, Chavez later stated "Neither Candye or I ever anticipated that working together would have such a profound impact on both of us. She was so encouraging, always pushing me into the spotlight to make sure that people knew who I was. Early on, she would force me to be the center of attention. That really helped me with my self-confidence, which I needed at the time." In 2014, Chavez made a guest appearance on The Mannish Boys album, Wrapped Up and Ready.

In early 2017, Chavez accepted the invite to join Nikki Hill's backing band. Chavez had known Nikki, and her then future husband, Matt Hill, for about ten years and it was a seamless transition. In the same year, Chavez played guitar on Vanessa Collier's album, Meeting My Shadow, which was released on Ruf Records. This was bookended by Chavez touring as part of the annual Blues Caravan tour, in association with Ruf Records, and later in support of Collier. In the same busy year, Chavez joined Monster Mike Welch and Mike Ledbetter on a Delta Groove Productions release, Right Place, Right Time, which went on to win a Blues Music Award for 'Traditional Blues Album'. Her frenetic recording activity in the year continued when she was the featured artist on Casey Hensley's debut album, Live, which saw a nomination for two 2018 Blues Blast Music Awards, in the 'Live Blues Album' and 'New Artist Debut Album' categories. To round out the twelve months for Chavez, Guitar Player magazine cover featured her as one of the "50 Sensational Female Guitarists."

Her touring commitments continued in 2018, with multiple events in Europe with the Nikki Hill band, followed by dates with Vanessa Collier, and recording guitar parts for Collier's album Honey Up. She also took part in the Blues Caravan tour again and added a few music festival appearances across North America. Chavez remarked "I tend to gravitate toward the more melodic, but that ranges from blues and soul to rock 'n' roll and country, anything that has melodic lines. I find a way to incorporate that in whatever I'm playing. Since then I've always liked the challenge of playing something people don't expect me to play."

She collaborated with Big Daddy Wilson, a North Carolina born singer, who has been living in Germany for several decades. Jim Gaines produced the album, Deep in My Soul, which was released in April 2019. During this time Chris Cain became a friend and influence. The same year, Chavez relocated to San Diego.

Chavez had some touring activity early in 2020, when she undertook a short foray in Russia with fellow San Diego musician, Whitney Shay. Chavez wrote some of the numbers for Shay's album, Stand Up, in addition to playing on the recording. The COVID-19 pandemic led Chavez down a different route when she decided to busk on the streets in Little Italy, San Diego, a marked change to her usual schedule of 250 concerts a year. Chavez stated "So, it's weird to have been here since March... I didn't touch a guitar for so long that my callouses pretty much wore off." Chavez also worked as the record producer and guitar player on Casey Hensley's 2020 album, Good as Gone.

In addition to her involvement in recording mentioned above, and in the discography below, Chavez has had a hand in albums with the Lucky Losers, Jade Bennett, Ina Forsman, Lindsay Beaver, and Katarina Pejak.

On March 20, 2026, Chavez will release her solo, debut album - the instrumental My Voice on Ruf Records.

== Equipment ==
In her early career, Chavez used either a Fender Stratocaster or a Gibson 335-S guitar, preferring a 1964 Fender Super Reverb amplifier. When she played with Nikki Hill, she used her usual Fender, with a Boss Fender '63 Reverb pedal and an RC boost. At home, she favors a Vero amplifier, made by the Fazio brothers.

Chavez now owns a number of guitars, but her favorite remains her reddish orange Stratocaster.

== Name ==
She is not to be confused with another American musician, Ana Laura Chávez (born February 18, 1986), commonly known as Ana Laura.

== Selected discography ==
=== Albums ===
Year	Title	Artist	Role
2008	Blues Caravan: Guitars & Feathers	Deborah Coleman / Candye Kane / Dani Wilde	Main personnel, guitarist
2009	Superhero	Candye Kane	Record producer, audio production, vocalist, guitarist, composer
2011	Sister Vagabond	Candye Kane	Record producer, guitarist, composer, featured artist
2011	Shine	Dani Wilde	Guitarist
2013	Coming Out Swingin'	Candye Kane	Record producer, guitarist, composer, featured artist
2014	Wrapped Up and Ready	The Mannish Boys	Guest artist, guitarist
2017	Right Place Right Time	Mike Ledbetter / Monster Mike Welch	Guitarist
2017	Meeting My Shadow	Vanessa Collier	Guitarist
2017	Live	Casey Hensley	Guitarist, featured artist
2018	Honey Up	Vanessa Collier	Guitarist
2020	Stand Up!	Whitney Shay	Guitarist, composer, featured artist
2020	Good as Gone	Casey Hensley	Record producer, guitarist
2021	Serve It To Me Hot	Chickenbone Slim	Guitarist
2023	Damn Good and Ready	Chickenbone Slim	Guitarist
2026	My Voice	Laura Chavez	Guitarist, composer, featured artist

== See also ==
- List of electric blues musicians
