= Vanessa Collier =

American saxophonist and singer

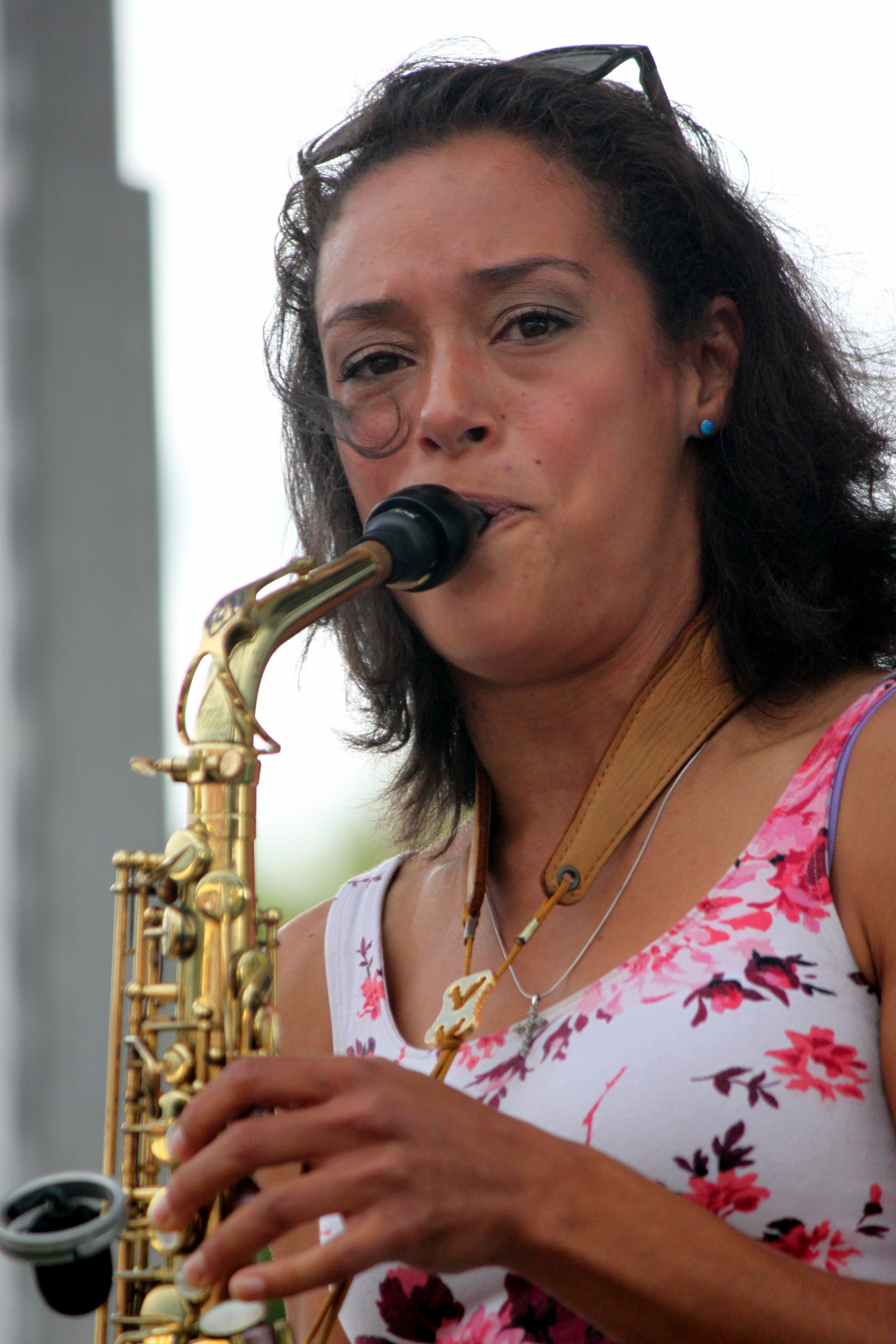
- Performing at the Trinidaddio Blues Fest 2018 - Trinidad Colorado

Background information
- Born: Vanessa N. Collier; Dallas, Texas, U.S.
- Occupations: Saxophonist; singer; songwriter
- Instruments: Saxophone; vocals
- Years active: 2012–present
- Labels: Phenix Fire; Ruf
- Website: vanessacollier.com

Vanessa N. Collier is an American blues, funk, and soul saxophonist, singer and songwriter. She has been nominated for twelve Blues Music Awards, including B.B. King Entertainer of the Year, Contemporary Blues Female Artist of the Year, and Horn Player of the Year, and has won four of them (Horn Player of the Year in 2019, 2020, and 2024 and Contemporary Blues Female Artist of the Year in 2022).

Her influences include Bonnie Raitt, Norah Jones, The Wood Brothers, Tedeschi Trucks Band, Ray Charles, Snooks Eaglin, Aretha Franklin, Herbie Hancock, Professor Longhair, and Cannonball Adderley. Collier is a Selmer endorsed woodwind artist.

== Life and career ==
Collier was born in Dallas, Texas, and grew up in Columbia, Maryland. Her interest in blues music started at the age of 11, when she played a solo on her saxophone over a blues progression in jazz band. Collier studied saxophone privately with Chris Vadala for a number of years, studying classical, jazz, and many other styles of music. Collier went on to earn dual degrees in Performance and Music Production & Engineering at Berklee College of Music in Boston, Massachusetts, graduating in 2013. At Berklee's Commencement Concert, Collier was invited to play alongside Annie Lennox and Willie Nelson. Collier also worked with Kathy Mattea, Bill Cooley, Patrice Rushen, and many more visiting artists during her four years studying at Berklee. She then toured in the U.S. and Turkey, backing Joe Louis Walker during 2012 and 2013.

In 2014, Collier issued her debut solo album, Heart Soul & Saxophone, on Phenix Fire Records. The work drew comparisons to artists including the Tedeschi Trucks Band and Bonnie Raitt. The album was declared as "magnificent" on Dan Aykroyd's blues radio show and named "Best of 2014 Blues Breakers" for her album. The album consisted of five Collier compositions and four cover versions. The former included "Bad News Bears" which was dedicated to a fellow saxophone player, Max Cowan, who died at a young age. The album's finale was a cover of James Morrison's "Right by Your Side". The interest the release generated resulted in Collier having her national debut tour in late 2014.

After her tour, she become a top-three finalist in the John Lennon Songwriting Competition, and reached the semi-finals of the 2016 International Blues Challenge in Memphis.

In 2017, she released her second album, Meeting My Shadow, on Ruf Records. It had eight Collier compositions, plus cover versions of U2's "When Love Comes to Town"; Deadric Malone's "You're Gonna Make Me Cry"; and the Sister Rosetta Tharpe penned song "Up Above My Head, I Hear Music in the Air". The album was co-produced by Collier and Kevin Houston and her studio musicians included Charles Hodges on keyboards, Laura Chavez on guitar, TK Jackson on drums, and Daniel McKee on bass. The release saw her tour in 12 countries, alternating between tour legs in Europe as a featured artist with Ruf’s Blues Caravan, returning to the U.S. and Canada with her own band, and a tour in Brazil with Fred Sunwalk and The Dog Brothers. She also performed at the Briggs Farm Blues Festival in Pennsylvania.

Collier was nominated in 2017 for a Blues Music Award in the 'Instrumental – Horn Player of the Year' category. She also won first place in the 'Lyrics Only' category of the 2017 USA Songwriting Competition. She undertook the second leg of her 2017 European tour with Ruf Records' Blues Caravan. Collier also teaches around 30 students at her own studio and is active in the Blues Foundation's 'Blues in the Schools' programs.

In 2018, Collier was nominated in two categories at that year's Blues Music Awards; 'Contemporary Blues Female Artist of the Year' and 'Instrumental – Horn Player of the Year'. She released her third album Honey Up on Phenix Fire Records in July 2018 at the Briggs Farm Blues Festival. Honey Up spent nine weeks on Billboard in the Top Blues Albums Chart.

In 2019, she was again nominated in two categories at the Blues Music Awards; 'Contemporary Blues Female Artist of the Year' and 'Instrumental - Horn' for the second year in a row. On May 9, 2019, she won the latter award, and did so again in 2020.

In August 2020, Vanessa released her fourth solo album, Heart on the Line, on Phenix Fire Records.

== Discography ==
Year	Title	Record label
2014	Heart Soul & Saxophone	Phenix Fire Records
2017	Meeting My Shadow	Ruf Records
2018	Blues Caravan 2017 (with Big Daddy Wilson and Si Cranstoun)	Ruf Records
2018	Honey Up	Phenix Fire Records
2020	Heart on the Line	Phenix Fire Records
2024	Do It My Own Way	Phenix Fire Records
