= Ina Forsman =

Finnish singer-songwriter (born 1994)

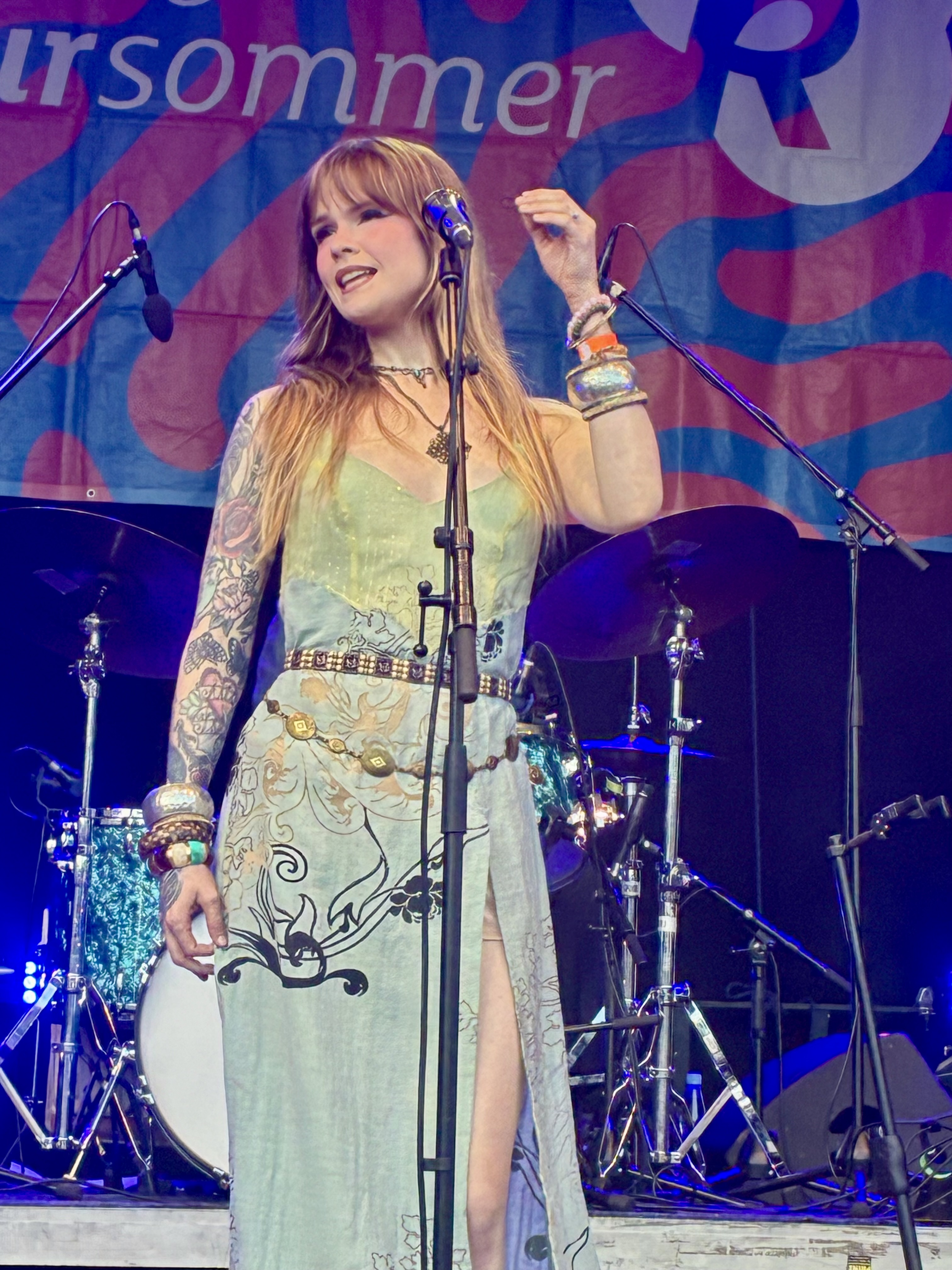
- Ina Forsman (2026)

Background information
- Born: 1994 (age 31–32); Helsinki, Finland
- Genres: Blues, soul blues
- Occupation: Singer-songwriter
- Instrument: Vocals
- Years active: 2010s–present
- Website: https://www.inaforsman.com/

Ina Forsman (born 1994) is a Finnish blues singer-songwriter. She has been involved in the recording of six albums since 2013.

== Career ==
She was born in Helsinki, Finland. At the age of six, Forsman decided she wanted to be a singer. She was initially influenced after hearing a Christina Aguilera recording, but later became entranced by the work of Donny Hathaway, Sam Cooke, and Aretha Franklin. When she was 15 years old, she came to the attention of the television watching public when competing in the first series of The Voice of Finland. She was noticed by the harmonicist Helge Tallqvist, who helped nurture her talent. By 2011, Forsman was performing on stage regularly and noted that "Helge was the first person who introduced blues to me. He took me to the studio and put our band together a couple of years ago. There aren't enough words to describe how much I learnt from him". Two years later the pairing recorded a collaborative album, Ina Forsman With Helge Tallqvist Band.

In 2014, Forsman represented Finland at the European Blues Challenge in Riga, Latvia, and toured in mainland Europe thereafter with the Belgian blues musician, Guy Verlinde. She signed a recording contract with Ruf Records in 2016, and released her debut solo album the same year. It was recorded at Wire Recording in Austin, Texas, and included her version of the Nina Simone track, "I Want A Little Sugar In My Bowl". Otherwise Forsman wrote all the album's lyrics and co-wrote the music with Tomi Leino. Her backing ensemble was Laura Chavez and Derek O'Brien (guitars), Nick Connolly (keyboards), Russell Jackson (bass guitar) and Tommy Taylor (drums). Tallqvist made a guest appearance playing the harmonica with brass accompaniment supplied by the Texas Horns, overseen by the record producer and saxophonist, Mark "Kaz" Kazanoff.

Forsman then toured the United States and Europe as a featured artist with Ruf's "Blues Caravan", alongside Tasha Taylor and Layla Zoe. The resultant live album and DVD, Blues Caravan 2016, ensued. More touring followed to support past endeavours but, whilst in New York City, she lost her mobile phone which contained lyrics and musical ideas for her next album. Finally in late 2018, Forsman had acquired sufficient new material to travel to Austin, Texas, to record her next collection. As before, along with Kazanoff, the Texas Horns, Chavez, and a posse of new sidemen, she emerged with Been Meaning to Tell You, released on 25 January 2019. Forsman penned all of the lyrics and co-wrote the music for the 12 tracks, which incorporated a soul blues style.

The same year, Forsman teamed up with another two emerging musicians in the latest Ruf Records Blues Caravan package tour. She was joined by Katarina Pejak and Ally Venable, and live recorded a 36 track long, Blues Caravan 2019, on DVD and CD. The collection included a live rendition of "Backwater Blues", written by Bessie Smith.

On 24 June 2022, Forsman released her latest album, All There Is, on Jazzhaus Records. She noted "On the new album, for the first time, I wrote the music by myself. The pandemic suddenly left me with no other option. On my earlier albums I wrote the lyrics and my vocal melody but left it to the other musicians to write their parts around my idea. This time I had to do all this alone."

She is currently residing in Berlin, Germany.

== Discography ==
=== Albums ===
Year	Title	Record label	Billed as
2013	Ina Forsman with Helge Tallqvist Band	Q-Records	Ina Forsman with Helge Tallqvist Band
2016	Ina Forsman	Ruf Records	
2016	Blues Caravan 2016	Ruf Records	Featuring Layla Zoe and Tasha Taylor
2019	Been Meaning to Tell You	Ruf Records	
2019	Blues Caravan 2019	Ruf Records	Featuring Katarina Pejak and Ally Venable
2022	All There Is	Jazzhaus Records	
2025	After Dark Hour	Jazzhaus Records	
