= Mokranjac Music School =

Coordinates: 44°48′54.1″N 20°27′44.1″E

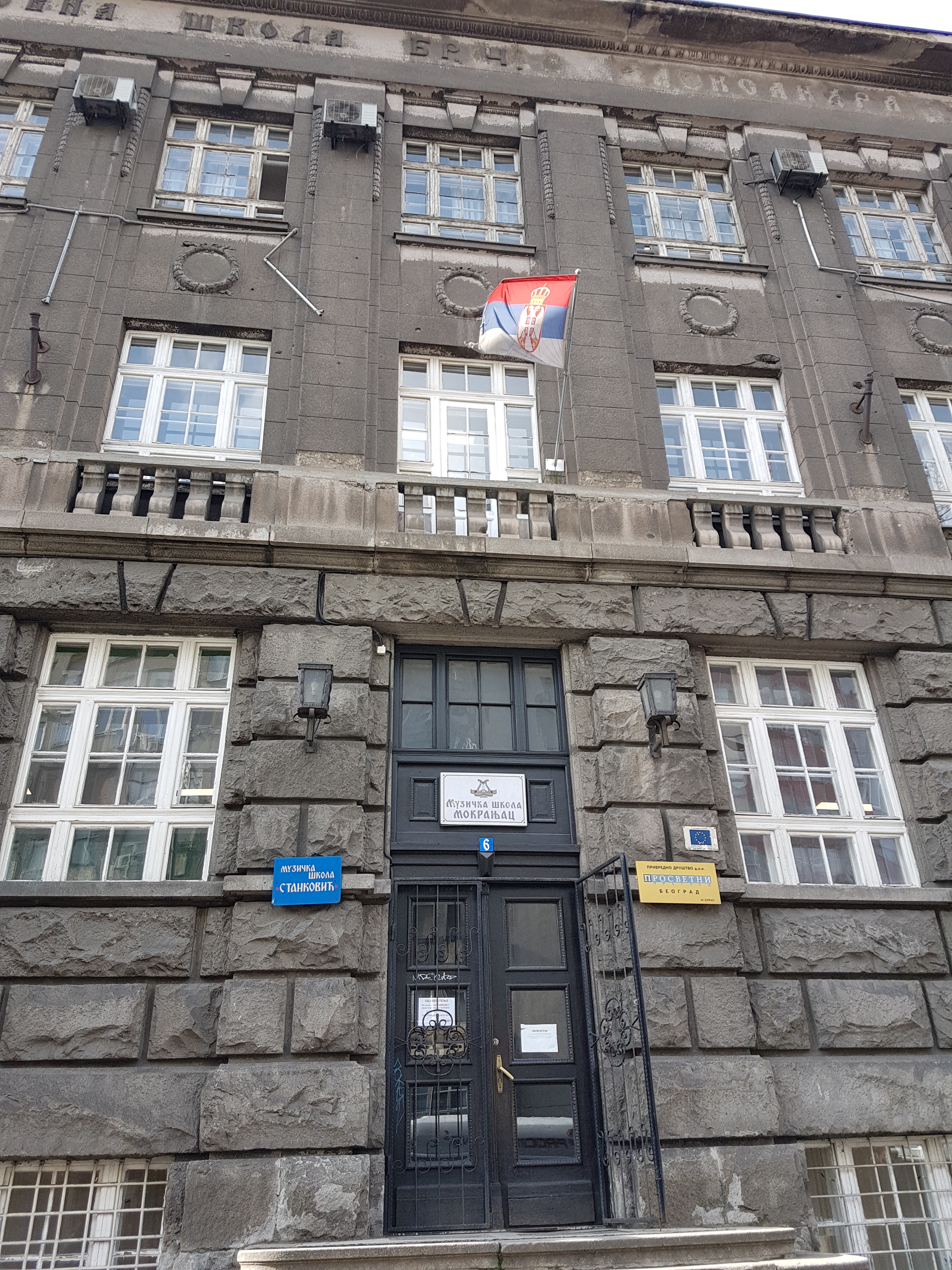
Mokranjac Music School

The Mokranjac Music School (Serbian Cyrillic: Музичка школа Мокрањац), formerly Serbian School of Music (Српска музичка школа), is a music school in Belgrade founded by Stevan Stojanović Mokranjac on 21 September 1896, under the auspices of the First Belgrade Choral Society (Прво београдско певачко друштво). On 28 March 1946, the school was named after its founder and first director Stevan Mokranjac who is considered to be one of the most important Serbian composers in history.

== Notable pupils ==
Among its notable pupils were Emina Jahović, the Serbian-Turkish singer-songwriter, actress and model of Bosnian ancestry, Lejla Hot, the Serbian singer-songwriter who graduated from Mokranjac's solo singing and piano sections, and the Serbian pianist Jelena Dokić, one of the first Serbian musicians to study abroad, who gave a concert at her return to the school in 1913. In addition, Katarina Pejak, the Serbian blues singer, songwriter, and pianist was educated there. The school’s faculty included composer Mirjana Sistek-Djordjevic.
