= Fender Super Reverb =

Guitar amplifier made by Fender

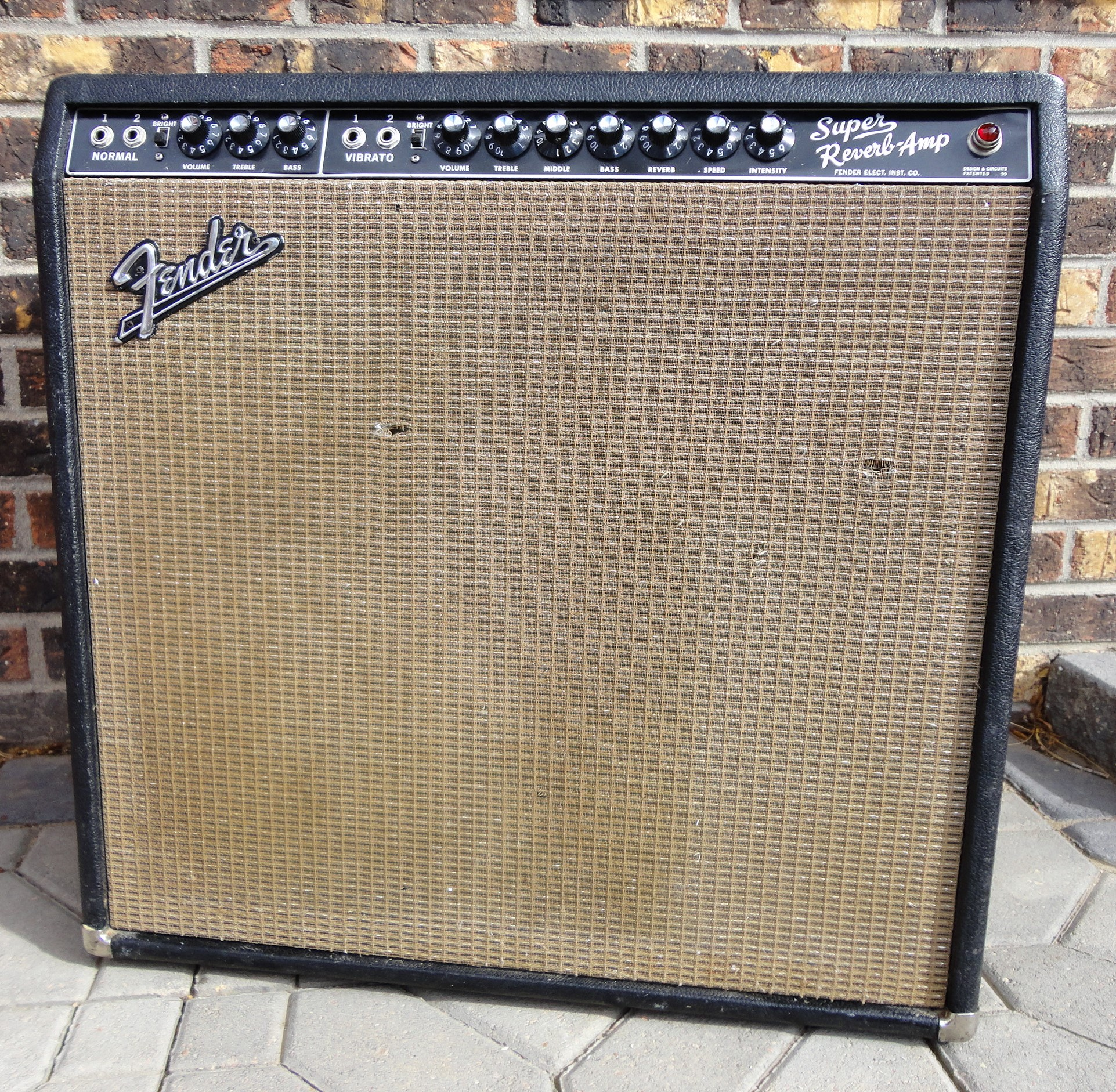
1964 Fender Super Reverb (blackface)

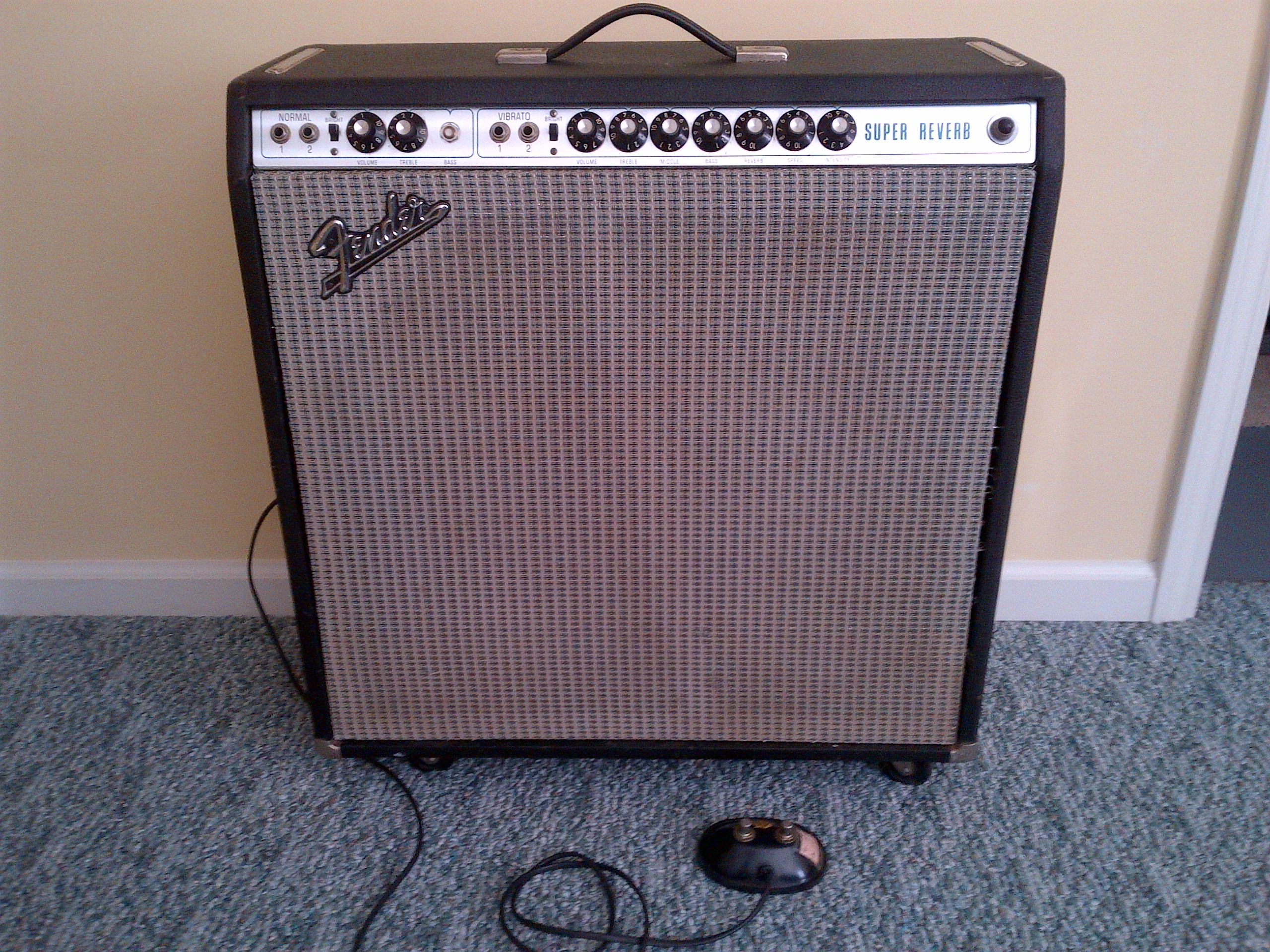
1972 Fender Super Reverb (silverface)

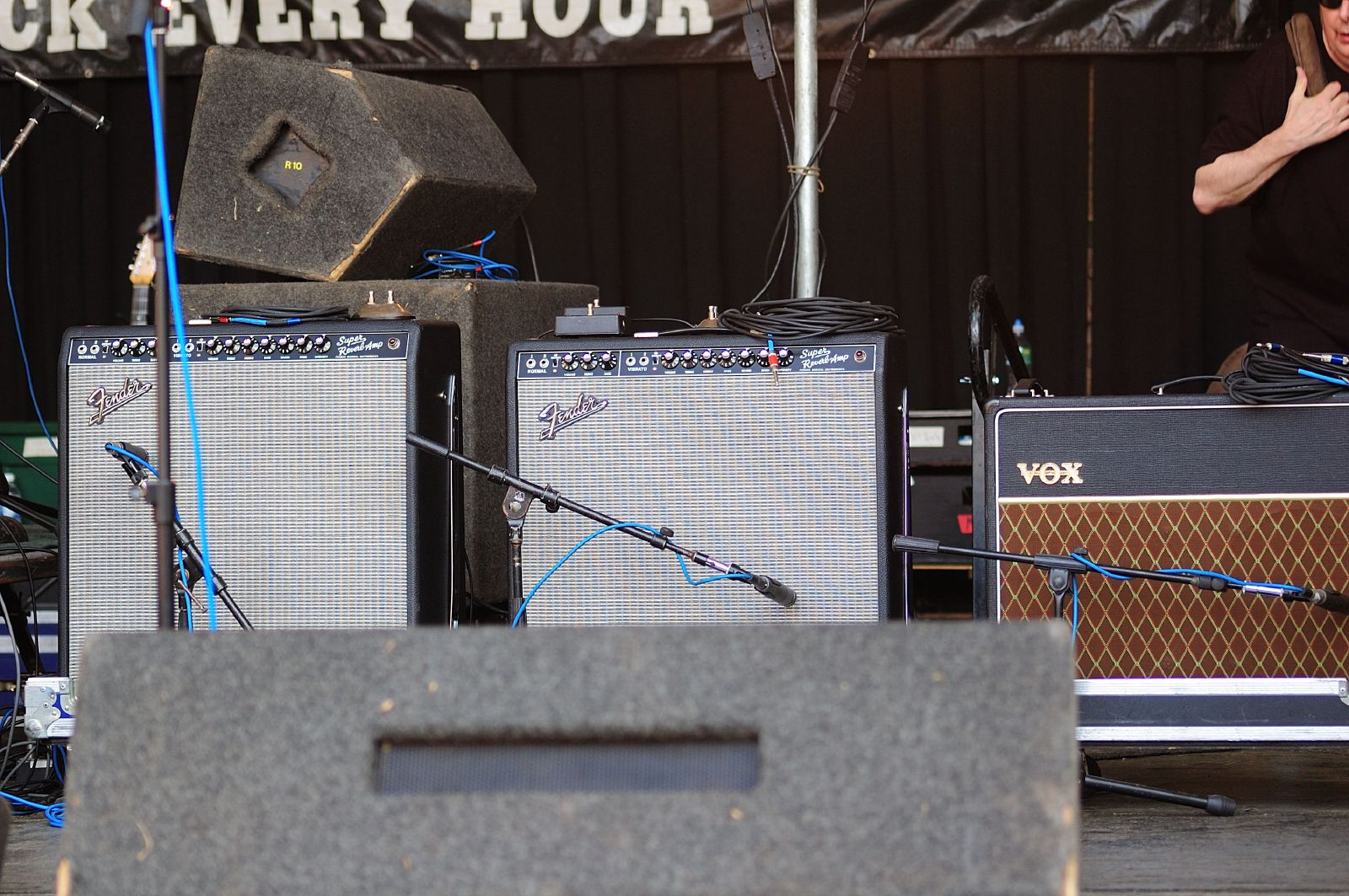
'65 Reissue Super Reverb Amps (on left)

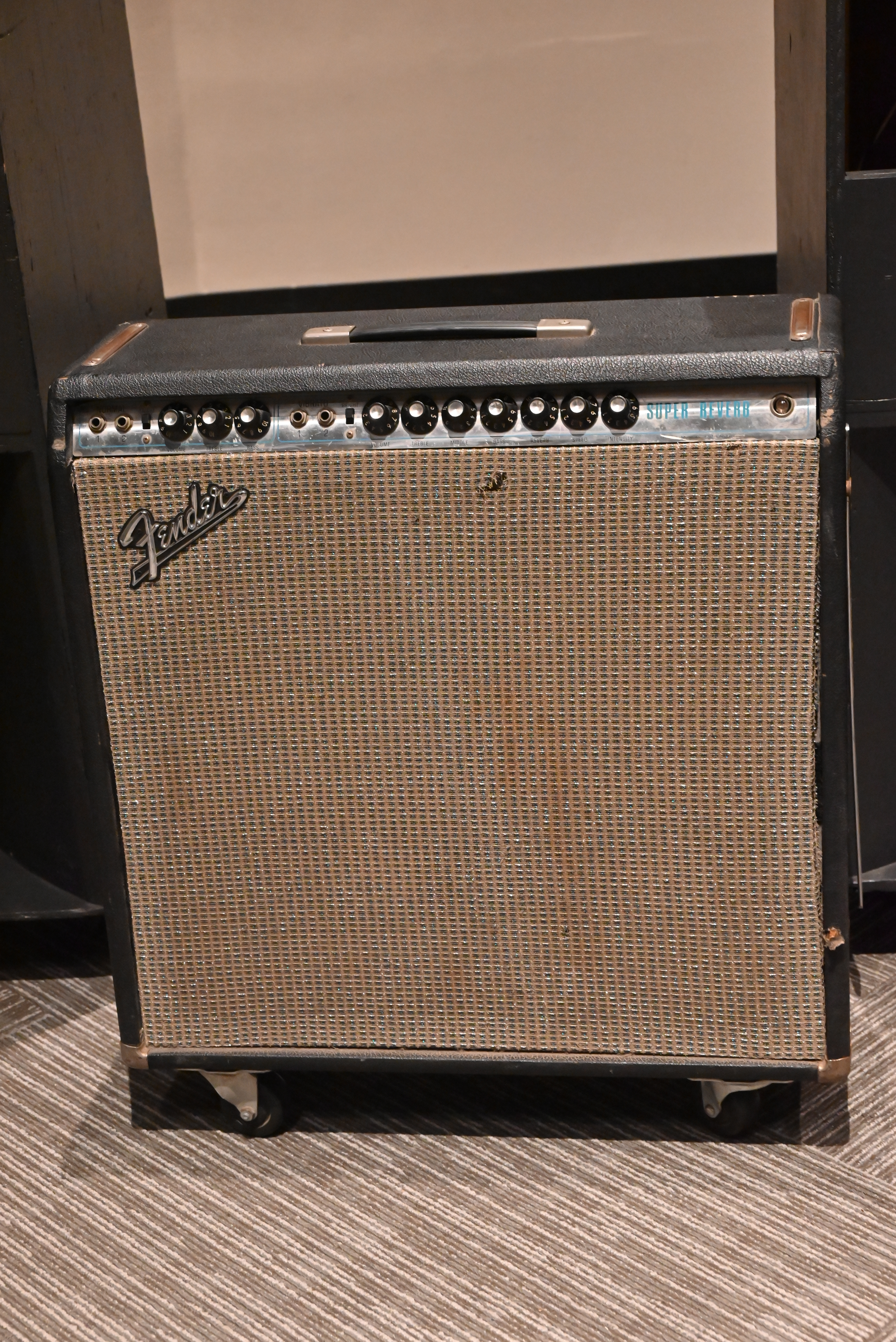
Super Reverb at Stax Records in Memphis

The Fender Super Reverb is a guitar amplifier made by Fender. It was introduced in 1963 and was discontinued in 1982. The Super Reverb was a Fender Super amplifier with built-in reverb and "vibrato" (actually tremolo). The original Super Reverb amplifiers were all-tube designs and featured spring reverb. There were two different designs, distinguishable by the color of the "face" or front control panel. Super Reverbs from 1963 through 1967 had "blackface" panels. From 1968 until its discontinuation in 1982, the Super Reverb had "silverface" cosmetics and circuitry. Early models in 1968, while cosmetically "silverface", did contain "blackface" circuitry. Fender introduced a reissue '65 Super Reverb in 2001 featuring a printed circuit board design rather than the hand-wired circuitry of the original '65 Super Reverb.

The Super Reverb is commonly used by blues guitarists due to its ability to deliver loud, warm tube distortion through its four 10" speakers. It is also known as having a scooped mids tonality, meaning that there is less midrange and an emphasis of sparkly treble and full, round bass frequencies.

== Specifications ==
Tube (valve) complement:

- 4 × 12AX7,
- 2 × 12AT7,
- 2 × 6L6,
- 1 × 5AR4/GZ34 RectifierTube for blackface amps and 5U4GB for silverface amps

Two channels: Normal and Vibrato, with Bright Switch

Dimensions:

- Height: 24 7/8 inches (63 cm)
- Width: 25 1/8 inches (64 cm)
- Depth: 10 1/2 inches (27 cm)
- Weight: approx. 65 pounds (29 kg)
- 40 watts into 4×10" 8-Ohm Jensen, Oxford, or JBL, or CTS speakers (wired in parallel for 2 Ohms)
- Silverface models: 45 watts (power increased to 70 watts in 1977 and a solid state rectifier added. These are known as the "ultralinear" models with different transformers. Master volume was added after 1972, and pull-out boost circuit added in 1975. Line Out jack socket and a 3-band equalization for the Normal Channel added in 1978.) Silverface amps made between '68 and '72 were emblazoned with "Super Reverb-Amp" with a tailed amp logo in the grille cloth. After 1972 this was changed to just "Super Reverb" and the tailed Fender logo from the mid-1960s was replaced with a modern "unscripted" tailless amp decal (changed to a "scripted" style in 1977). There were only minor adjustments made to the pre-1975 silverface Super Reverbs. Today aftermarket kits are sold for non-master silverface amps allowing them to be taken back to the more desired blackface specs.
- A master volume was added in late 1974.
- A "Boost" control was added in 1975.
- A Mid control for the Normal channel and a Line Out jack socket were added in 1978.
- Super Reverbs produced between late 1980 and 1981 have blackface cosmetics and a silver sparkle grille cloth but the same circuitry as prior years.

Some early Super Reverb amplifiers came with the option of factory equipped JBL speakers instead of the Jensen, Oxford or Utah speakers widely used in the majority of Fender amplifiers. The JBL speakers had aluminum dust caps with larger magnets and voice coils, this gives a fuller response range and handles more power reducing the risk of "blowing a speaker". These models also add to the overall weight of the amp, making casters (wheels) a very good option.

== Super Six Reverb ==
The Super Six Reverb is essentially a master volume Twin Reverb or Dual Showman Reverb equipped with six Oxford 10L6 (or CTS 10" AlNiCo) speakers featuring 10"/5.2 ohms (8 ohms each in series-parallel) and 100 watts RMS (changed to 135W in 1977). Introduced in 1972, this silverface combo amplifier was discontinued in 1979.

== Notable users ==
- Daniel Rossen
- Ronnie Earl
- Stevie Ray Vaughan
- Jimmie Vaughan
- Johnny Marr
- Lee Ranaldo
- Isaac Brock
- Freddie King
- Jimmy Page
- Robben Ford
- Derek Trucks
- Anson Funderburgh
- Philip Sayce
- Bryce Dessner
- Carrie Brownstein
- Alex Lifeson
- Wes Montgomery
- Doyle Bramhall II
- Fred "Sonic" Smith
- East Bay Ray
- Laura Chavez
- Marcus King
- Steve Cropper

== See also ==
- Fender Super
