= Katarina Pejak =

Serbian musician

- Born: Belgrade, Serbia
- Genres: Blues
- Occupations: Singer-songwriter, pianist
- Instruments: Vocals, piano
- Years active: 2010s–present
- Label: Ruf Records
- Website: https://www.katarinapejakmusic.com/

Katarina Pejak is a Serbian blues singer, songwriter, and pianist. She blends a basic blues styling with elements of soul, folk and jazz. Pejak has been involved in the recording of seven albums since 2010.

== Life and career ==
She was born in Belgrade, Serbia. Her father was a promoter and manager of a blues and jazz club, while her mother was a flamenco dancer. Due to her parents involvement in music, many musicians descended on her home when she was growing up with music playing a regular occurrence. Pejak spent time with her two grandmothers who would inspire the youngster with their storytelling abilities. Her father's record collection gave Pejak early access to recorded works by Tom Waits, Bessie Smith, Van Morrison, and Otis Spann among others. She began a decade long study of classical music at the piano, but realised in her late teenage years that she was not made to become a classical music performer. Her interest in a wider musical palate was increased by listening to a variety of styles including rock and roll, blues, jazz, and American folk music. Pejak was also drawn towards writing songs. Around this time, she began performing in blues clubs, both in Belgrade and other Serbian cities. In 2011, Pejak began studying songwriting at the Berklee College of Music and graduated in 2014. Whilst there, she obtained the annual Songwriting Achievement Award. Before her temporary relocation to the United States, she had already issued an album on Blues Time Records, Perfume & Luck (2010). It was recorded in a theatre using nothing more than a piano and her own vocals, while Pejak was still attending Belgrade's Mokranjac Music School.

In 2012, while still a student at Berklee, Pejak issued First Hand Stories, and played a few gigs in both New England and New York. In 2015, she returned to Berklee as a mentor and taught songwriting at Berklee's Songwriting Week. After more concert appearances, in 2016 she released the live mini-album, Old. New. Borrowed & Blues. It was recorded based on a television broadcast for a national TV network, that was based in Novi Sad, Serbia. By this point, Pejak had performed at the Belgrade Beer Fest (2012 and 2013), at the Funky Biscuit Club in Boca Raton, Florida, (2016), and onwards at the Vienna Blues Fest (2017), and undertaken various gigs in Kolkata, India (2017). Having established bases both in Nashville, Tennessee, and Belgrade, Pejak signed to Ruf Records in 2018. On 9 February 2018, she performed with her trio in the Budo Tomović Cultural-Informational Centre in Podgorica, Montenegro.

In February 2019, Ruf Records released Roads That Cross, which was listed by AllMusic as one of their 'Favorite Blues Albums' of that year. It was produced by Mike Zito, at his Marz Studios in Nederland, Texas, and the recording quartet included Laura Chavez playing lead guitar. The album contained mainly original material, with elements of jazz, pop, and rock, to expand the blues base. Pejak stated "I didn't realize until after making the album, but most of these songs are about good byes". The collection included Pejak's versions of Joni Mitchell's "Sex Kills" and Janis Joplin's "Turtle Blues".

The same year, Pejak became a third of the Blues Caravan 2019, who played over 60 shows across Europe. She toured with Finland's Ina Forsman and the Texas born Ally Venable. A concert was recorded on 15 February 2019 at Café Hahn in Koblenz, Germany. Pejak stated "My shows provide a blend of blues, country, jazz and rock 'n' roll wrapped in a piano-driven sound... Between me and the other two ladies, the audience will get a 360 tour around the crossroads where blues meets with other genres".

Pejak has performed with Ronnie Earl and Ana Popović, and undertaken concerts throughout parts of Europe and the United States.

== Discography ==
=== Albums ===
Year	Title	Record label	Billed as
2010	Perfume & Luck	Blues Time Records	
2012	First Hand Stories	Blues Time Records	
2016	Old. New. Borrowed & Blues (live album)	Blues Time Records	Katarina Pejak & Friends
2019	Roads That Cross	Ruf Records	
2019	Blues Caravan 2019	Ruf Records	Featuring Ina Forsman and Ally Venable
2024	Pearls on a String	Ruf Records	
