= The Toughest Girl Alive =

Studio album by Candye Kane
- Released: 2000
- Genres: Blues; swing blues
- Length: 39:55
- Label: Bullseye Blues
- Producer: Scott Billington

Candye Kane chronology
| Swango (1998) | The Toughest Girl Alive (2000) | Whole Lotta Love (2003) |

The Toughest Girl Alive is a studio album by the American musician Candye Kane, released in 2000. She supported it with a North American tour. The album title was later used for a stage musical about Kane's life.

== Production ==
The album was produced by Scott Billington. It was recorded after Kane's divorce from her husband, Thomas Yearsley, of the Paladins, and saw her take a more independent approach. Nine of the album's songs were cowritten by Kane; many were influenced by the 1990s swing revival. Marcia Ball played piano on the title track. Dave Alvin played guitar on several tracks. Larry Taylor played bass on the album. "Who Do You Love?" was written by Jack Tempchin. "Get Happy" is a version of the song made famous by Judy Garland. "Scream in the Night" is a cover of the song associated with Julia Lee. "(Hey Mister) She Was My Baby Last Night" references Kane's bisexuality. The album liner notes include an essay by Penn Jillette.

== Critical reception ==
Professional ratings
Review scores
| Source | Rating |
|---|---|
| AllMusic | 4/5 stars |
| Boston Herald | 3/4 stars |
| The Penguin Guide to Blues Recordings | 2.5/4 stars |

The Globe and Mail noted that Kane, on "Highway of Tears", "can be subtle as well, shading into jazz territory on an especially attractive song." The Boston Globe wrote, "More Dolly Parton than Patsy Cline, she again takes on Western swing and jump blues with a vengeance, making 'Let's Commit Adultery' a throaty challenge and turning '(Hey Mister!) She Was My Baby Last Night' into a bisexual affirmation." The Waterloo Region Record said that the songs "prove her to be the Mae West of musical mayhem." The Morning Call called the album a "collection of faux swing, blues and torch numbers [that] nudges and winks at the listener regularly." The Kansas City Star stated that the album "showcases her dexterous voice, which can be volcanic, like Big Mama Thorton's, or twangy and clean, like Patsy Cline's." The Columbus Dispatch praised the "gender-bending, racy songs [that] put her in range of the Lil Johnsons and Alberta Hunters". The Chicago Tribune listed The Toughest Girl Alive as the eighth best blues album of 2000.

== Track listing ==
| No. | Title | Length |
|---|---|---|
| 1. | "I'm the Toughest Girl Alive" | 3:07 |
| 2. | "Who Do You Love?" | 3:56 |
| 3. | "One More Day (Without Your Love)" | 3:34 |
| 4. | "For Your Love" | 3:26 |
| 5. | "Didn't We" | 2:45 |
| 6. | "Who Walks in When I Walk Out" | 2:34 |
| 7. | "To See a Grown Man Cry" | 4:08 |
| 8. | "(Hey Mister!) She Was My Baby Last Night" | 1:59 |
| 9. | "Je n'en peux plus sans ma Cadillac (I Can't Go On Without My Cadillac)" | 2:41 |
| 10. | "Let's Commit Adultery" | 3:45 |
| 11. | "Highway of Tears" | 3:08 |
| 12. | "Get Happy" | 2:06 |
| 13. | "Scream in the Night" | 2:46 |
| Total length: | | 39:55 |
