= Ally Venable =

American musician (born 1999)

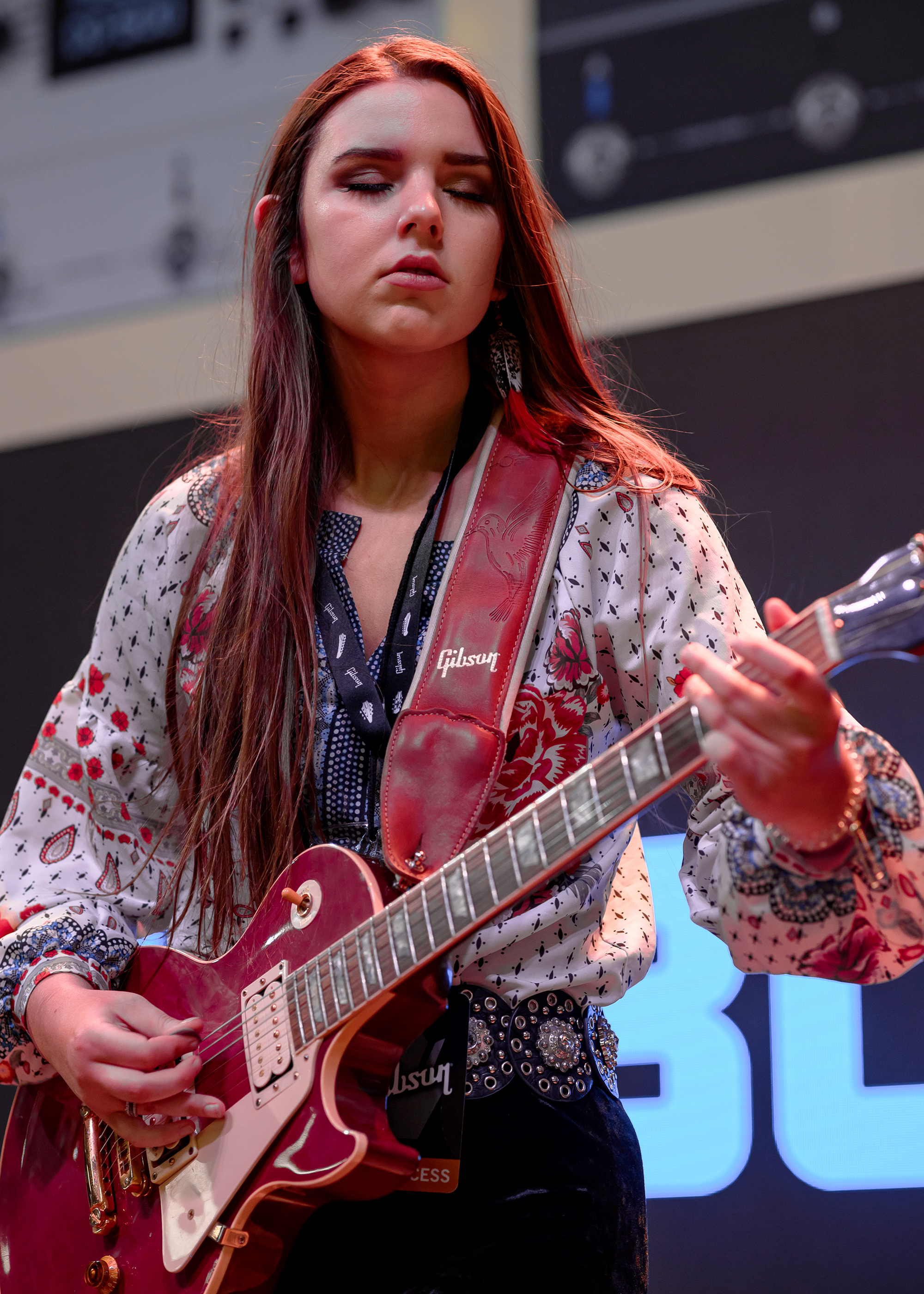
- Venable performing in 2020

Background information
- Born: Ally Marie Venable; April 7, 1999 (age 27); Kilgore, Texas, US
- Genre: Blues rock
- Occupations: Guitarist; singer; songwriter
- Years active: 2013-present
- Label: Ruf
- Website: Official website

Ally Marie Venable (born April 7, 1999) is an American blues rock guitar player, singer, and songwriter. She is the 2014, 2015 ETX Music awards female guitar player of the year, and she and her band were the ETX Music Awards 2015, 2016 blues band of the year.

Ally Venable was just 14 when she released her debut EP, Wise Man (2013), which earned her a reputation as a rising star in the Lone Star State's blues community.

Venable's first album, No Glass Shoes, with Connor Ray Music finished at number 16 in the RMR Electric Blues Charts for 2016. Venable is touted a must-see act for under-30-year-olds by America's Blues Scene. Her second album, Puppet Show, debuted at No. 7 in the Billboard Blues Albums Chart. The album Texas Honey was released in 2019; video directed by John Chambers.

In 2019, Venable was a third of Ruf Records Blues Caravan 2019, who played over 60 shows across Europe. She toured with Finland's Ina Forsman and the Serbian Katarina Pejak.

She resides in Kilgore, Texas.

== Discography ==
- No Glass Shoes (2016)
- Puppet Show (2018)
- Texas Honey (2019)
- Heart of Fire (2021)
- Real Gone (2023)
- Money & Power (2025)
