= Truly Madly Deeply (novel) =

Novel by Faraaz Kazi

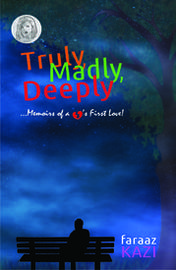
- Truly Madly Deeply Book Cover
- Author: Faraaz Kazi
- Illustrator: DigiImprint Solutions
- Cover artist: DigiImprint Solutions
- Language: English
- Genre: Romance fiction
- Published: 2012
- Publication place: India
- Pages: 312
- ISBN: 9789350880098

Truly Madly Deeply... Memoirs of a Broken Heart's First Love! is a romance novel written by Indian author Faraaz Kazi. It was first published in 2010 by Cedar publishers. The book was republished again in October 2012 and went on to become a national award-winning title apart from becoming the first book by an Indian author to win the Goodreads Choice Award for Best Debut (Romance). It remains the only Indian book in the Top 100 YA Global Fiction list.

== Plot ==
After moving to Philadelphia from Mumbai, India, teen Rahul Kapoor has difficulty coping with what seems to be the loss of a loved one. Upon enrolling into Delaware Valley High School, Rahul is introduced to Sahil, an American born Indian who is assigned the task of familiarizing Rahul with his new schooling.
