= The Dualers =

British ska musical group

- Origin: South London
- Genres: Ska, reggae
- Years active: 1999–present
- Labels: Shell, Galley Music, Sunbeat Records
- Website: Official website

The Dualers are an eight-piece (or nine-piece) ska and reggae band from South East London. Initially comprising brothers Si and Tyber Cranstoun, and now led by Tyber following Si's departure in 2010 for a solo career, they first developed a profile when the single "Kiss on the Lips" entered the UK top 30, peaking at 21, in October 2004 despite no industry backing.

The Dualers have supported Madness at their large outdoor concerts and played headline gigs at Indigo O2, Fairfield Halls in Croydon and the Churchill Theatre in Bromley.

== History ==
The Dualers started out in 1999 as a busking duo of Si Christone and Tyber O'Neil (brothers Simon David Cranstoun and Jonathan Lloyd Cranstoun) who could be found on the streets of Bromley, Canterbury, Croydon, Kingston and Romford playing a mix of doo-wop, pop and ska.

By 2004, an old school friend called David Ellis reckoned that the brothers must have played to thousands of people on the streets of these towns, so much so, that they would have a big enough fanbase to release a single. Ellis set up a record label with the brothers called Galley Music and persuaded local Virgin and HMV shops stock a record by the pair called "Kiss on the Lips". 6,000 singles were pressed up by Galley Music, with enough being sold in the local area for the record to chart in the Top 40 of the Official Charts Company's Singles Chart, on a week where they could be still be seen busking outside the Liberty Music Shop in Romford.

In 2005, the duo signed to Guy Holmes' Gut Records label and scored another Top 40 hit with "Truly Madly Deeply".

In 2010 Si Cranstoun decided to embark on a solo career, with The Dualers expanding to become a nine-piece ska band.

In 2019, The Dualers scored their first OCC Album Chart hit after selling 4,229 copies of their Palm Trees And 80 Degrees album to reach No.11. In 2022, Voices from the Sun became their second hit album, with a weekly sale of 2,789 album getting them a number 26 chart debut.

== Discography ==
=== Albums ===
- On An English Street - Dual – Not on a label
- Vintage Versions Volume I – Sandcamel Records
- Vintage Versions Volume II – Galley Music
- Rhymes & Rhythms – Galley Music
- The Melting Pot – Galley Music
- Get Festive Volume 1 – Galley Music
- Upbeat Sounds – Galley Music
- The Very Best of Vintage Versions – Galley Music
- The Cooking Pot – Galley Music
- The Summer of Ska – Live at the Indigo July 22nd 2010
- With Respect
- Prince Buster Shakedown – Phoenix City a division of Cherry Red Records Ltd
- Rewind
- Back to Paradise – Sunbeat Records
- Reggae Street
- Live at Indigo 2nd December 2015
- Reggae Street 2
- Palm Trees and 80 Degrees (2019, Sunbeat Records) – No. 11 UK
- Reggae Street III (2020 Sunbeat Records
- Voices from the Sun (2022)
- Reggae Street 4 (22 November 2024 Sunbeat Records)
- Beach Life (21 November 2025 Sunbeat Records)

=== DVD ===
- The Dualers – Documentary DVD 2006
- The Dualers – Documentary Reissued DVD 2010
- The Summer of Ska – Live at the Indigo2 22 July 2010

=== Singles ===
Title	Year	Peak chart positions
Title	Year	UK
"Kiss on the Lips"	2004	21
"Truly Madly Deeply"	2005	23
"Don't Go"	2006	61
"Stole The Show"	2006	
"In Harmony"	2008	
"Wonder Girl"	2008	
"A Message To You Rudy"	2008	
"Running Around With Your Head in The Clouds"	2013	
"Dancin Till The Sun Comes Up"	2019	
"Red Light"	2022	
