= Julius Smend =

German theologian (1857–1930)

Julius Smend (10 May 1857 – 7 June 1930) was a German theologian born in Lengerich, Westphalia. He was a brother to theologian Rudolf Smend (1851–1913) and the father of musicologist Friedrich Smend.

He studied theology in Bonn, Halle and Göttingen, receiving his ordination in 1881. Afterwards he worked as an auxiliary minister in Bonn, and in 1885 became a minister in Seelscheid. In 1891 he taught classes at the seminary in Friedberg, and two years later was appointed professor of practical theology at the University of Strasbourg.

In 1896 with Friedrich Spitta (1852–1924), he founded Monatsschrift für Gottesdienst und kirchliche Kunst, a monthly magazine of worship and religious art. With Spitta, he was a primary representative of the Ältere liturgische Bewegung (Older Liturgical Movement), a theological entity that was created by Smend at the Thomaskirche in Strasbourg. In 1914 he was co-founder of the Protestant theological faculty at Münster (rector, 1919/20).

His best written work was Die evangelischen deutschen Messen bis zu Luthers deutscher Messe ("The Protestant Masses up until Luther's German Mass"; 1896).
