= Gibson 335-S =

Solidbody version of the Gibson ES-335 guitar

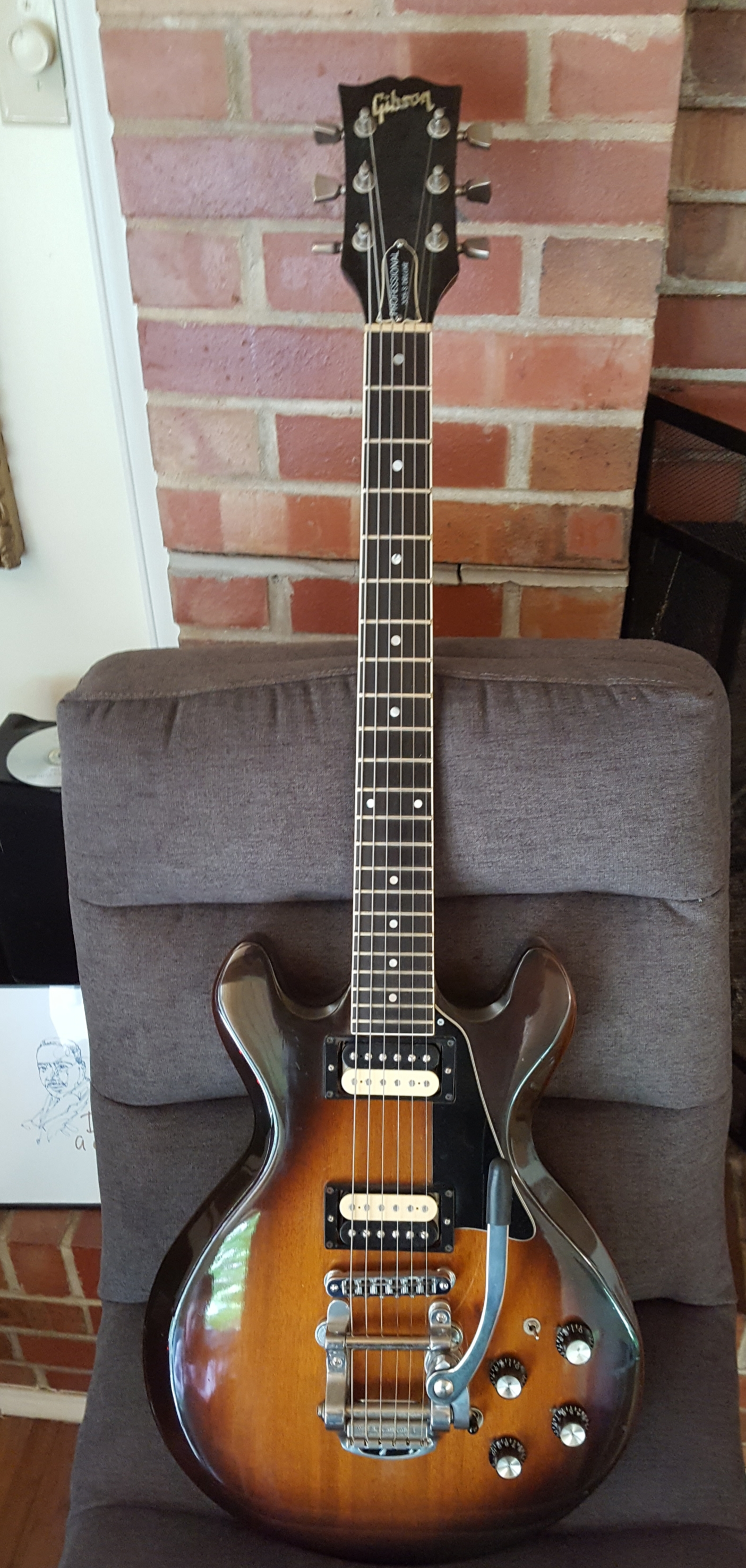
Gibson 335-S Deluxe

The Gibson 335-S was a solid-body version of their very popular Electric Spanish guitar, the ES-335. Although a very similar shape (though a little smaller), and with identical controls, being a solid-body rather than semi-acoustic guitar gave this model a rather different sound.

The 335-S came in three varieties:

- 335-S Deluxe: Mahogany body and neck, bound ebony fingerboard, pearl inlaid headstock
- 335-S Custom: Mahogany body and neck, unbound rosewood fingerboard
- 335-S Standard: Maple body and neck, unbound rosewood fingerboard

All models were fitted with two humbucking pickups, and two volume and two tone controls. The pickups in the Deluxe and Custom were Gibson's "Dirty Fingers", with a coil-tap switch, to allow a single-coil mode, while the Standard had Gibson Superhumbuckers with no coil-tap facility.

All three versions were introduced in mid-1980; Custom and Standard ended production in 1981; the Deluxe in 1983.

In 2011 Gibson reissued the 335-S with specifications similar to the 335-S Standard, but with one tone control and Gibson Burstbucker pickups.
