= Lengerich, Westphalia =

Lengerich
- Town
- Coat of arms

- Location of Lengerich within Steinfurt district
- Interactive map of Lengerich
- Location within Germany Location within North Rhine-Westphalia
- Coordinates: 52°10′30″N 7°52′0″E
- Country: Germany
- State: North Rhine-Westphalia
- Admin. region: Münster
- District: Steinfurt
- Subdivisions: 12

Government
  - Mayor (2020–25): Wilhelm Möhrke (Ind.)

Area
  - Total: 90.79 km^{2} (35.05 sq mi)
- Elevation: 80 m (260 ft)

Population (2025-12-31)
  - Total: 22,591
  - Density: 248.8/km^{2} (644.5/sq mi)
- Time zone: UTC+01:00 (CET)
  - Summer (DST): UTC+02:00 (CEST)
- Postal codes: 49525
- Dialling codes: 05481; 05482 (Wechte)
- Vehicle registration: ST, TE, BF
- Website: www.lengerich.de

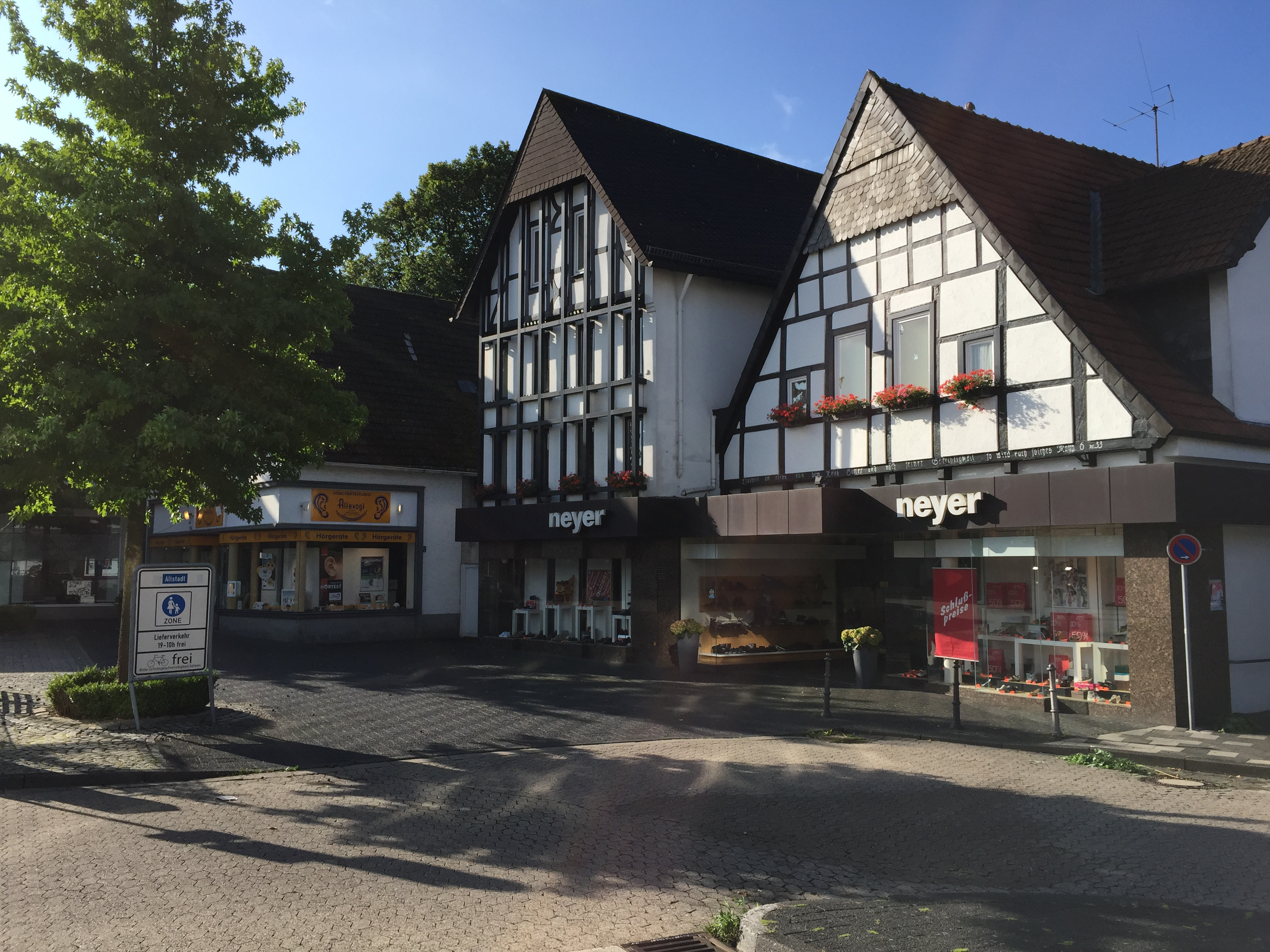
Half-timbered house

Lengerich (German pronunciation: [ˈlɛŋəʁɪç]; Westphalian: Lengerke) is a town in the district of Steinfurt, in North Rhine-Westphalia, Germany. It is situated on the southern slope of the Teutoburg Forest, approx. 15 km south-west of Osnabrück and 30 km north-east of Münster.

== Transportation ==
Lengerich is situated at the Wanne-Eickel-Hamburg railway and offers half-hourly connections to Münster and Osnabrück. The A1 autobahn also runs through Lengerich and the Lengerich/Tecklenburg exit is located to the west of the city.

== Population ==
Historical population

Year	Pop.	±% p.a.
1965	21,268	—
1970	21,265	−0.00%
1975	20,830	−0.41%
1980	20,589	−0.23%
1985	20,316	−0.27%
1990	21,045	+0.71%
1995	21,802	+0.71%

Year	Pop.	±% p.a.
2000	22,052	+0.23%
2005	22,359	+0.28%
2010	22,234	−0.11%
2015	22,461	+0.20%
2020	22,511	+0.04%
2025	22,591	+0.07%

Source: Landesdatabank Nordrhein-Westfalen

== Mayors ==
The mayor is the pharmacist Wilhelm Möhrke (independent), the predecessor was Friedrich Prigge.

== International relations ==
Lengerich, Westphalia is twinned with:

- Leegebruch (Brandenburg, Germany)
- Wapakoneta (Ohio, United States)
- Warta (Poland)

Lengerich's neighboring municipalities, Ladbergen and Lienen, are sister cities in the United States with Wapakoneta's neighbors New Knoxville and Saint Marys, respectively.

== Notable people ==
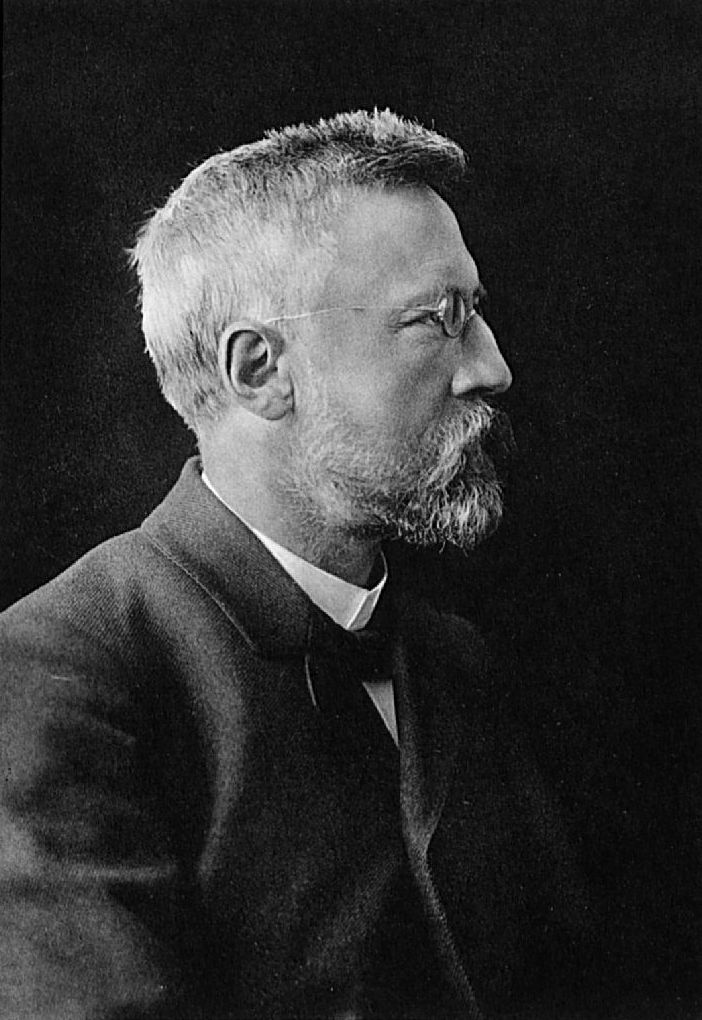
Rudolf Smend

- Friedrich Kipp (1878–1953), writer
- Wolfgang Sidka (born 1954), football professional and coach
- Rudolf Smend (1851–1913), Theologian (Old Testament)
- Julius Smend (1857–1930), theologian
- Kai Strauss (born 1970), blues musician
- Wolfgang Streeck (born 1946), sociologist and director at the Max Planck Institute for Society Research in Cologne
