= Rudolf Smend =

German theologian

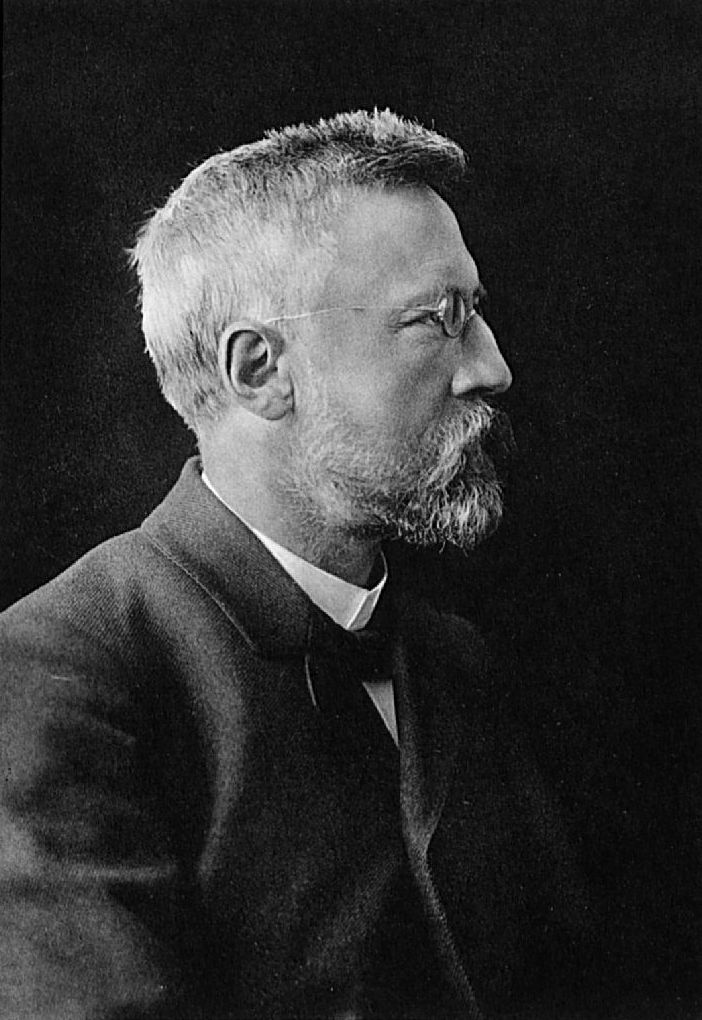
Rudolf Smend

Rudolf Smend (November 5, 1851 – December 27, 1913)--"the Elder"-- was a German theologian born in Lengerich, Westphalia. He was an older brother to theologian Julius Smend (1857–1930), and the father of Carl Friedrich Rudolf Smend (1882–1975), an authority on constitutional and ecclesiastical law, and the grandfather of noted Old Testament scholar Rudolf Smend who spent his life at the University of Göttingen as one of two chairs of Old Testament (1971-1998).

He studied theology at the Universities of Göttingen, Berlin and Bonn, earning his doctorate in 1874 with a dissertation on Arabic poetry. In 1880 he became an associate professor of the Old Testament at the University of Basel, where shortly afterwards he attained the title of full professor.

In 1889 he returned to the University of Göttingen as a professor of Biblical science and Semitic languages. At Göttingen he was reunited with his former teacher Julius Wellhausen (1844–1918), who was a major influence in his professional career. Smend is largely remembered for critical examination of the Old Testament, particularly in his research involving stories of the Hexateuch. In 1907 with Alfred Rahlfs (1865–1935) he created the Septuaginta-Unternehmen (Septuagint Venture) in the Göttingen Society of Sciences.

Smend died in Ballenstedt.

== Selected publications ==
- Der Prophet Ezechiel (The Prophet Ezekiel), 1880
- Lehrbuch der alttestamentlichen Religionsgeschichte (Textbook of Old Testament religious history), 1899
- Die Weisheit des Jesus Sirach (The wisdom of Jesus Sirach) with Hebrew glossary, 1906
- Die Erzählung des Hexateuch auf ihre Quellen untersucht (Sources of the Hexateuch investigated), 1912
