= Candye Kane =

American singer-songwriter (1961-2016)

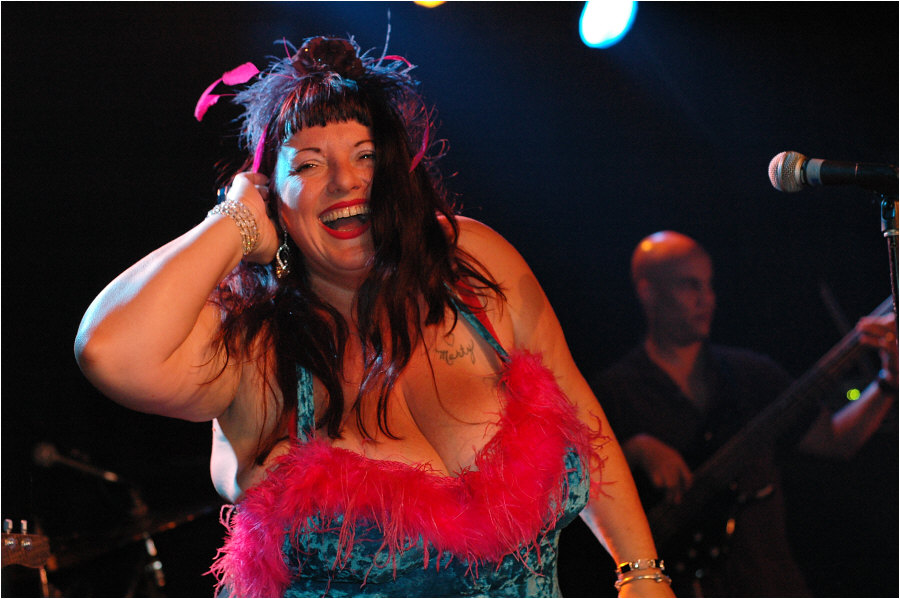
- Kane in January 2005

Background information
- Born: Candice Caleb; November 13, 1961; Ventura, California, U.S.
- Died: May 6, 2016 (aged 54) Los Angeles, California, U.S.
- Genres: Blues; jazz
- Occupations: Singer; songwriter; feminist; adult film actress
- Instrument: Vocals
- Years active: 1986–2016
- Labels: Sire London; Ruf; Delta Groove; Vizztone; Antone's
- Website: candyekane.com

Candice Caleb (November 13, 1961 – May 6, 2016), known professionally as Candye Kane, was an American adult film star; and later a blues singer.

== Early life ==
Kane was born Candice Caleb in Ventura, California. She was raised in Highland Park, a Los Angeles suburb.

== Adult film star ==
When she turned 18, she turned to adult modeling and stripping to make some money, appearing in videos and over 150 magazines from 1983 to 1995. Eventually she worked as a columnist for Gent magazine.

== Music career ==
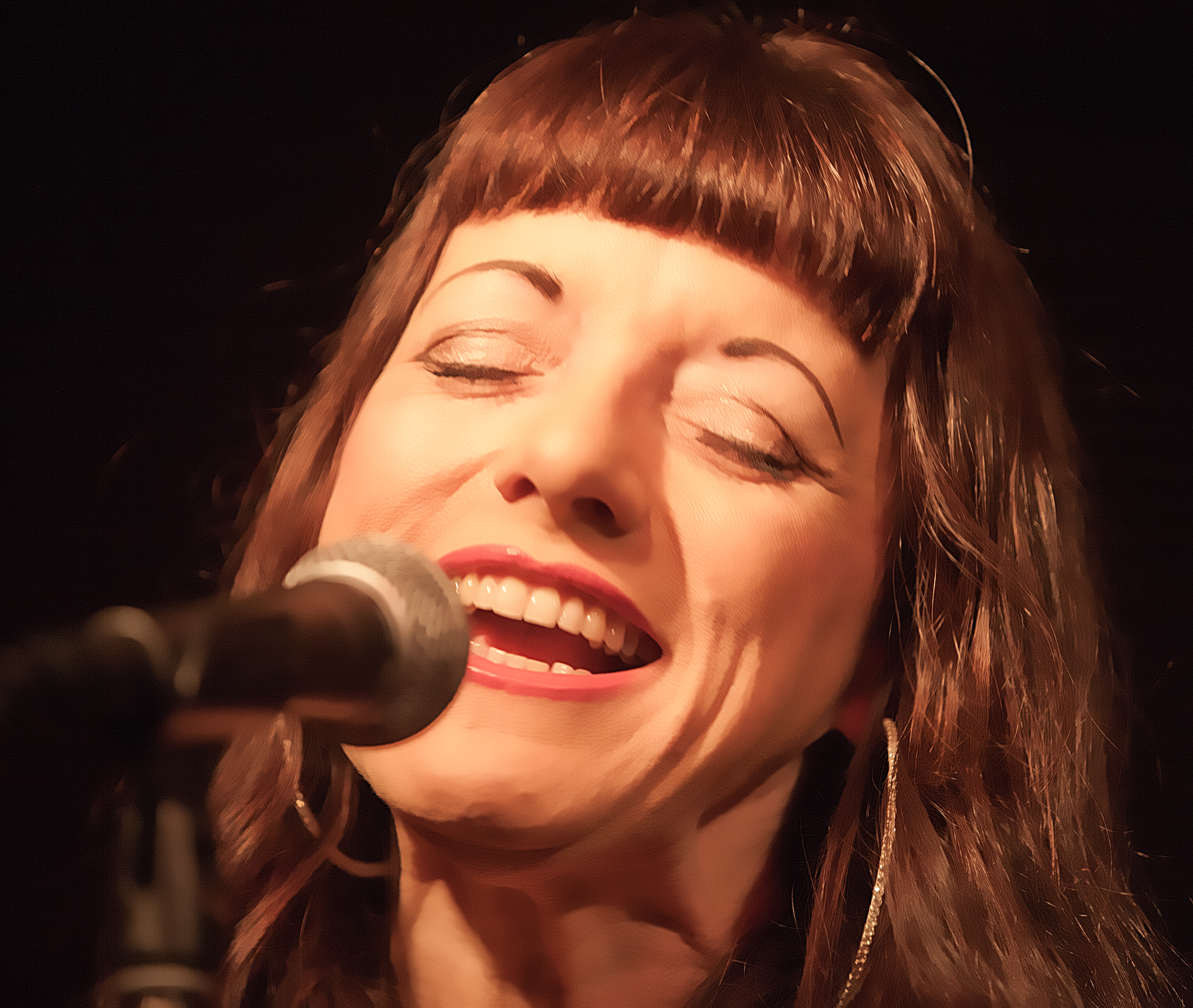
Candye Kane in Stockholm 2012

Kane was accepted into the University of Southern California's music conservatory's junior opera program in 1976, but she disliked opera and dropped out. She became part of the punk rock music scene of the early 1980s. She started country punk bands and befriended and shared the stage with musicians as diverse as Black Flag, Social Distortion, James Harman, The Circle Jerks, Los Lobos, The Blasters and Lone Justice. In 1985, she caught the attention of CBS/Epic A&R Head, Larry Hanby. She was signed to a developmental deal and recorded her first demo with Grammy winner Val Garay. Kane was marketed as a country singer, but CBS dropped her upon learning of her controversial past.

At 17, Kane became pregnant with her first son. In 1986, she moved from Los Angeles to San Diego. She married bass player Thomas Yearsley (of rockabilly power trio The Paladins), with whom she had another son.

Kane majored in women's studies at Palomar Community College. She continued to write songs and discovered the brash blues stylings of Big Maybelle, Ruth Brown, Big Mama Thornton, Etta James and Bessie Smith. In 1991, she self-released Burlesque Swing, her first recording since A Town South of Bakersfield Part II. In 1992, she was signed by Clifford Antone to a record deal with Antones Records. Her first CD, Home Cookin' , was produced by Yearsley, Cesar Rosas (of Los Lobos), and Dave Gonzales. It was released in 1992 followed by Knock Out. She then signed with Discovery Records, releasing Diva La Grande, produced by Dave Alvin and Derek O'Brien. Next, she was signed by record mogul Seymour Stein to Sire Records during the height of the swing revival.

Candye released Swango, which was produced by Mike Vernon for Sire/London Records; it was her only major label release. This was followed by her Bullseye Blues/Rounder release, The Toughest Girl Alive, produced by Scott Billington. Next she released four CDs on the German label Ruf Records. Subsequent titles included Whole Lotta Love, produced by Val Garay and White Trash Girl, produced in Austin by Ruf Records and Mark Kazanoff. In 2007, she released Guitar'd and Feathered on Ruf Records. The CD was produced by former Muddy Waters guitarist Bob Margolin. In 2009, she signed to Delta Groove Productions and released Superhero in June 2009.

She made a "topless" video for the song "All You Can Eat" during which she pounded the keyboards with her bare breasts. She dropped this routine from her act after her first bout with cancer, which caused her to lose over 100 pounds and reduced her bust from 44H to 38D.

A stage play about Kane's life debuted at San Diego's Diversionary Theatre in January 2009, directed by Javier Velasco. The play, titled The Toughest Girl Alive, was based on Kane's memoir about her turbulent life.

She was included on the Essential Women in Blues CD set released by the 'House of Blues' record label and the Rock for Choice compilation. She appeared on the 1988 compilation A Town South of Bakersfield Part II on Enigma Records, which included tracks by Jim Lauderdale, Katy Moffatt, Lucinda Williams, Dwight Yoakam and several others.

== Songwriting ==
Among the songs that Kane wrote were "The Toughest Girl Alive" (used on the series Hidden Palms for the CW network); "Who Do You Love" (nominated for an OUT music award); "200 Pounds of Fun" (featured in the motion picture, The Girl Next Door); "For Your Love" (included on an episode of The Chris Isaak Show); "Please Tell Me a Lie" (used in the motion picture Heavy, starring Deborah Harry); "You Need a Great Big Woman" (used on the Oxygen Network series Strong Medicine); and "The Lord Was a Woman" (recorded by comedian Judy Tenuta).

== Later career and touring ==
At the time of her death, Kane was signed to Vizztone Label Group. She toured worldwide more than 250 days a year and appeared in many festivals, including the Ascona Jazz Festival, Midem, Paléo Festival, Monterey Jazz Festival, Dubai International Jazz Festival, Waterfront Blues Festival, Byron Bay Blues Festival in Australia and Notodden Blues Festival. She played for the president of Italy at the French embassy in Rome and at the Cannes Film Festival, and her music often was featured on B.B. King's Bluesville on XM radio.

== Awards ==
In 2011, Kane was nominated for two Blues Music Awards by the Blues Foundation, B.B. King Entertainer of the Year, and Best Contemporary Blues Female.

Kane was nominated for four Blues Music Awards, for the B.B. King Entertainer of the Year Award, Best Contemporary Blues CD for Superhero, and Best Contemporary Blues Female of 2010. She has won numerous awards, including the Best Blues Band award at the San Diego Music Awards seven times.

Her other honors included Best Blues CD of 2005 at the San Diego Music Awards; the Trophees France International Award 2004 for Best International Blues Chanteuse and Artist of the Year. She unseated Jewel for Artist of the Year at the San Diego Music Awards and won the California Music Award for Best Swing-Cabaret Artist. In May 2007, Kane won an award for Best Original Blues composition by the West Coast Songwriters Association for her song, "I'm My Own Worst Enemy." In 2012, Kane received a special Courage in Music Award at the San Diego Music Awards ceremonies.

In 2014, Kane was nominated for a Blues Music Award in the category "Contemporary Blues Female Artist of the Year".

== Personal life ==
Kane had two sons, one of whom, Evan Caleb, played drums in her road band for almost 10 years, and on a few of her records. She appeared often at gay pride festivals and identified openly as bisexual. Kane had become an activist and philanthropist in her later years. In August 2009, she appeared in Dublin, Ireland for the World Congress for Down Syndrome with her United by Music charity.

=== Health and death ===
In March 2008, Kane revealed on her website that she had been diagnosed with pancreatic cancer and was undergoing treatment. This was found to be a neuroendocrine tumor and was successfully resected on April 18, 2008 at UCSD Thornton Hospital.

Kane died from the disease at the Cedars-Sinai Medical Center in Los Angeles on May 6, 2016, aged 54.

== Discography ==
- Coming Out Swingin' (2013, Sister Cynic/VizzTone) †
- Sister Vagabond (2011, Delta Groove) †
- One Night in Belgium with Sue Palmer (2011, self-released)
- Superhero (2009, Delta Groove)
- Blues Caravan: Guitars & Feathers with Deborah Coleman and Dani Wilde (2008, Ruf)
- Rich Man's War (2008, Ruf)
- Guitar'd and Feathered (2007, Ruf)
- White Trash Girl (2005, Ruf)
- Best of Doo Wop II (2004, Rhino)
- Diva La Grande (2004, Ruf - reissue)
- Whole Lotta Love (2003, Ruf)
- Any Woman's Blues (2001, Rounder)
- The Toughest Girl Alive (2000, Bullseye Blues/Rounder)
- Hard Headed Woman – A Tribute to Wanda Jackson (2000, Bloodshot)
- Swango (1998, Sire/London)
- Essential Women in Blues (1997, House of Blues)
- Diva La Grande (1997, Antone's/Discovery)
- Rock for Choice (1996, Enigma)
- Knockout (1995, Antone's)
- Texas Rocks! (1995, Antone's)
- Home Cookin' (1994, Antone's)
- Burlesque Swing [live] (1991, self-released)
- A Town South of Bakersfield, Part II (1986, Enigma)

† billed as featuring Laura Chavez

== DVD ==
- Blues Caravan: Guitars & Feathers with Deborah Coleman and Dani Wilde (2008, Ruf)
- Candye Kane in Concert (2003, Ohne Filter)

== Selected filmography ==
- Boobsville Cabaret (1998)
- Best of Breasts 3 (1995)
- Blue Vanities S-579 (1995)
- Candy's Back (1995)
- Blue Vanities 221 (1994)
- Candye Kane (1992)
- Ten Years of Big Busts (1989)
- Bra Breakers Vol. 1 (1988)
- Legends of Lust 2: Christy Canyon (1987)
- Let Me Tell Ya Bout Fat Chicks (1987)
- Best of Big Busty (1986)
- Between My Breasts 3 (1986)
- Bouncin' in the U.S.A. (1986)
- Big Melons 5 (1985)
- 2 Tons of Fun (1985)
- Huge Bras 4 (1985)
- Big Busty 17 (1986)
- Big Busty 14 (1986)
- Big Melons 3 (1985)
- I Want It All (1984)
- Big Busty 5 (1984)
- Candy Girls 4 (1984)
- Huge Bras 2 (1983)
- Big Busty 3 (1983)
