= Si Cranstoun =

English singer (born 1971)

- Born: Simon David Cranstoun; October 1971 (age 54); Caterham, Surrey, England
- Genres: Rock and roll; rockabilly; R&B; ska; soul
- Occupation: Singer

Simon David Cranstoun (born October 1971) is an English singer who spent many years as a busker on the streets of London and performed in the Dualers, a ska band he formed with his brother Tyber, before becoming better known as a composer and singer of music influenced by 1950s and 1960s rock and roll and rhythm and blues.

== Life ==
Simon Cranstoun was born in Caterham, Surrey. His father, Bill Cranstoun, promoted Jamaican music in the 1960s. Si also loved 1950s and 1960s rock and roll and R&B music. Because he knew so many songs, he was chosen as singer for his high school band. He began to write songs at the age of 16. Cranstoun and his brother Tyber formed the Dualers, a ska band. Cranstoun spent twenty years as a street busker in London, and once was given 30p by Prime Minister Tony Blair.

Cranstoun met his wife, Tamu, while singing in Croydon. They have a daughter and a son. He left the Dualers in 2010. He adopted a style that had more rock or rhythm and blues. He formed a band which started to get hired to perform in pubs and small venues. He said of the difficulty in getting started, "they just saw me as a reggae artist doing bebop and were a bit like: 'What is he doing here?'" In 2013, he performed with Little Richard in Las Vegas. He was spotted in April that year and signed up with Warner Music's East West label. His single "Caught in the Moonlight" was shortlisted on the BBC Radio 2 playlist, while album Modern Life peaked at number 30 on the OCC UK Albums chart in October 2014.

== Style ==
Cranstoun has said that Elvis Presley's music was the first music he ever listened to, and Presley profoundly influenced his taste. He told an interviewer, "As a kid I used to spend all my pocket money on vintage records from the '50s and '60s. I got it home, listened to it, loved it, sang along to it." His style draws heavily on music of this period. He said of his single "Never Gonna Let You Go", "Motown Soul fused with Rock 'n' Roll. Well, they said it could never be done so this song is going to prove them wrong." Chris Evans described his vintage pop as, "A squeeze of the Bee Gees, a bit of Billy Joel, a dash of Dean Friedman, and a ripple of Rodriguez."

== Discography ==
=== Albums ===
- 2009: Get Lively, Galley Music
- 2009: Skinny Jeans, Galley Music
- 2010: Alternative Floor Fillers, Galley Music
- 2010: Get Festive Vol 1, Galley Music
- 2012: Dancehalls and Supper Clubs, Galley Music
- 2014: Modern Life, East West
- 2015: Old School, Ruf Records

=== Singles ===
- 2010: "Dynamo", Gallery Music
- 2014: "Never Gonna Let You Go", East West
- 2014: "Dance for Evermore", East West
- 2014; "Caught in the Moonlight", East West

== Sources ==
- Charles Hutchinson (11 August 2015), "Retro soul singer Si Cranstoun to play Rayner Rock'n'Roll dance night in Tadcaster", The Press, York
- Charlotte McDonagh (23 January 2015), "VIDEO EXCLUSIVE: Si Cranstoun is back with brilliant new single Never Gonna Let You Go", Sunday Express
- John Donegan (6 June 2013), Si Cranstoun's unusual start to a singing career., Sydney: ABC
- Patrick Emery (13 March 2014), "Si Cranstoun", Beat
- "Si Cranstoun", Discogs
- "Si Cranstoun and his band", Peel Centenary Centre, 2016
- Tim Birkbeck (10 September 2015), "Si Cranstoun dances his way over to The Wedgewood Rooms", Portsmouth News, Johnston Publishing Ltd.
