= Tasha Taylor =

American singer-songwriter

- Occupations: Singer; songwriter; producer; musician; actress
- Father: Johnnie Taylor

Tasha Taylor is an American Blues and Soul vocalist, songwriter, and actress.

== Early life and education ==
Tasha Taylor is the daughter of American soul and rhythm and blues recording artist Johnnie Taylor.

== Career ==
Tasha Taylor is the youngest daughter of pioneering R&B artist Johnnie Taylor. Tasha grew up in Dallas, Texas. She started traveling with her family on tour as a child and was surrounded by legends in music. She was a featured artist on Tommy Castro’s album, The Devil You Know. As an actress, she has been featured in episodes of Moesha, House and Ugly Betty, and the indie films, Dimples and Heaven Ain’t Hard to Find. As a composer, her original music has been featured on the television programs Men in Trees and Lipstick Jungle. In 2016, Taylor toured the United States with Ruf's "Blues Caravan". The resultant live album, Blues Caravan 2016, ensued. Tasha also toured with Jim Belushi and Dan Akroyd with The Blues Brothers. Tasha was signed to Warner Chappell Music as a songwriter in 2000, and to Epic Records for a solo artist deal in 2000, and later signed to RUF Records Germany (2016). Tasha was nominated by the Los Angeles Black Music awards for Best Female R&B Performer, Best New Song, Best Blues Music Performer, Best Live Performer, and Entertainer Of The Year 2019. She won for Best Female R&B Performer and Best Music Performer. Tasha sings, writes, and produces her own original Soul music. She has released four studio albums: Revival, Taylormade, Honey For The Biscuit, EP Push & Pull, and her newest album: Soul Kitty. Tasha has performed at The Detroit Blues Festival, New Orleans’ Jazzfest and for Friends of New Orleans at the Democratic National Convention, The Blues Caravan Tour, Tasha has shared the bill with Blues, Soul and R&B icons such as Aretha Franklin, Bobby Watson, Bobby Blue Bland, Allen Toussaint, Taj Mahal, Carla Thomas, Susan Tedeschi, Samantha Fish, Robert Randolph & The Family Band, Joe Bonamassa, Tommy Castro, Buckwheat Zydeco, and Voice of the Wetlands—Tab Benoit and Donald Harrison, Jim Belushi and Dan Aykroyd Blues Brothers. Tasha teamed up with film producer Stuart Benjamin to co- produce and play the role of Mavis Staples in the original Musical: SOUL, THE STAX MUSICAL at Baltimore Center Stage.

== Discography ==
=== Albums ===
- Revival (2003)
- Taylormade (2010)
- Blues Caravan (2016)
- Honey for the Biscuit (2016)
- Push & Pull (2019)
- SOUL KITTY(2024)

=== Singles ===
- "Get Involved" by Raphael Saadiq and Q-Tip - Backing vocals (1999)

== Filmography ==
=== Film ===
Year	Title	Role	Notes
2006	The Puritan	Charity Ring	
2008	Dimples	Kim	
2010	Heaven Ain't Hard to Find	Tiffany	

=== Television ===
Year	Title	Role	Notes
1994	Living Single	Jennifer	Episode: "Truth for Trust"
1994, 1997	Family Matters	Ariana / Girl at Party	2 episodes
1995	The Wayans Bros.	Tammi	Episode: "It's Shawn! It's Marlon! It's Superboys!"
1997	The Naked Truth	Hotel Guest	Episode: "The Debt"
1997	Malcolm & Eddie	Roxie	Episode: "Whole Lotta Love Seat"
1998–2000	One World	Kate	3 episodes
2000	Moesha	Tiffany	Episode: "Something About Moesha"
2000–2001	Strip Mall	Tasha	13 episodes
2001	7th Heaven	Gina Miller	Episode: "Work"
2004	Yes, Dear	Abby	Episode: "Couples Therapy"
2006	Ugly Betty	Thursday Night	Episode: "The Lyin', the Watch and the Wardrobe"
2007	House	Kate the Mother	Episode: "Needle in a Haystack"
