= Blues Matters! =

British music magazine established in 1999

Blues Matters! is a bimonthly British blues magazine.

== History ==
Blues Matters! was founded by Alan Pearce in 1999. It is published on a bimonthly basis. With Geraint Morgan and Darren Howells (until 2009) previously served as the magazine's editor-in-chief.

The Blues Foundation, in Memphis, Tennessee, awarded the magazine the "Keeping the Blues Alive" (KBA) Award for 2007, in the Print Media category. This is only the second time a British publication has received the award, and the first time for a Welsh production. Previous recipients have included major titles, such as Rolling Stone. Blues Matters! is also the recipient of the European Blues Awards 2014 in the category of best publication.
