= Blues Traveler discography =

- Studio albums: 15
- Live albums: 3
- Compilation albums: 4
- Singles: 19
- Music videos: 14

This is the discography for American blues rock band Blues Traveler.

== Albums ==
=== Studio albums ===
| Title | Album details | Peak chart positions | | Certifications (sales threshold) |
| Title | Album details | US | US Indie | Certifications (sales threshold) |
|---|---|---|---|---|
| Blues Traveler | Release date: May 1990; Label: A&M | 136 | — | RIAA: Gold |
| Travelers and Thieves | Release date: September 3, 1991; Label: A&M | 125 | — | RIAA: Gold |
| Save His Soul | Release date: April 6, 1993; Label: A&M | 72 | — | RIAA: Gold |
| four | Release date: September 12, 1994; Label: A&M | 8 | — | RIAA: 6× Platinum; MC: 2× Platinum |
| Straight On till Morning | Release date: July 1, 1997; Label: A&M | 11 | — | RIAA: Platinum; MC: Gold |
| Decisions of the Sky: A Traveler's Tale of Sun and Storm | Release date: Late 2000; Label: Blues Traveler Publishing | — | — | |
| Bridge | Release date: May 8, 2001; Label: A&M | 91 | — | |
| Truth Be Told | Release date: August 5, 2003; Label: Sanctuary | 147 | — | |
| ¡Bastardos! | Release date: September 13, 2005; Label: Vanguard | — | 49 | |
| Cover Yourself | Release date: October 30, 2007; Label: C3 | — | — | |
| North Hollywood Shootout | Release date: August 26, 2008; Label: Verve Forecast | — | — | |
| Suzie Cracks the Whip | Release date: June 26, 2012; Label: 429 | 91 | — | |
| Blow Up the Moon | Release date: April 7, 2015; Label: Loud & Proud | — | 29 | |
| Hurry Up & Hang Around | Release date: October 12, 2018; Label: BMG Rights Management | — (Note: Hurry Up & Hang Around did not enter the US Billboard 200, but peaked at number 72 on the Top Album Sales chart.) | 14 | |
| Traveler's Blues | Release date: July 30, 2021; Label: Round Hill | — (Note: Traveler's Blues did not enter the US Billboard 200, but peaked at number 63 on the Top Current Album Sales chart.) | — | |
| Traveler’s Soul | Release date: October 20, 2023; Label: Round Hill | — | — | |
"—" denotes releases that did not chart

=== Live albums ===
| Year | Title | Peak chart positions |
| Year | Title | US |
|---|---|---|
| 1996 | Live from the Fall | 46 |
| 2002 | Live: What You and I Have Been Through | — |
| 2004 | Live on the Rocks | — |

=== Compilation albums ===
| Year | Title |
|---|---|
| 2002 | Travelogue: Blues Traveler Classics |
| 2012 | 25 |
| 2013 | Icon |
| 2014 | The Definitive Collection |

== Singles ==
| Year | Title | Peak chart positions | | | | | | | | Album |
| Year | Title | US | US AAA | US Adult | US Mod | US Main | US Pop | CAN | UK | Album |
|---|---|---|---|---|---|---|---|---|---|---|
| 1990 | "But Anyway" | — | — | — | — | — | — | — | — | Blues Traveler |
| 1991 | "All in the Groove" | — | — | — | — | — | — | — | — | Travelers and Thieves |
| 1991 | "Sweet Pain" | — | — | — | — | — | — | — | — | Travelers and Thieves |
| 1992 | "Mountain Cry" | — | — | — | — | — | — | — | — | Travelers and Thieves |
| 1993 | "Conquer Me" | — | — | — | — | 34 | — | — | — | Save His Soul |
| 1993 | "Defense & Desire" | — | — | — | — | — | — | — | — | Save His Soul |
| 1995 | "Run-Around" | 8 | — | 2 | 14 | 13 | 4 | 13 | 183 | four |
| 1995 | "Hook" | 23 | — | 22 | 13 | 15 | 8 | 40 | — | four |
| 1995 | "The Mountains Win Again" | — | 14 | — | — | — | — | 54 | — | four |
| 1996 | "But Anyway" (re-release) | — | 5 | — | 17 | 19 | 24 | 45 | — | Kingpin (soundtrack) |
| 1997 | "Carolina Blues" | — | 11 | — | 30 | 4 | — | 67 | — | Straight On till Morning |
| 1997 | "Most Precarious" | — | 1 | 33 | 25 | 27 | — | 22 | — | Straight On till Morning |
| 1998 | "Canadian Rose" | — | — | — | — | — | — | 32 | — | Straight On till Morning |
| 2001 | "Girl Inside My Head" | — | 3 | — | — | — | — | — | — | Bridge |
| 2001 | "Back In The Day" | — | 2 | — | — | — | — | — | — | Bridge |
| 2003 | "Let Her and Let Go" | — | 19 | — | — | — | — | — | — | Truth Be Told |
| 2005 | "Amber Awaits" | — | — | — | — | — | — | — | — | ¡Bastardos! |
| 2008 | "You, Me and Everything" | — | — | — | — | — | — | — | — | North Hollywood Shootout |
| 2012 | "You Don't Have to Love Me" | — | — | — | — | — | — | — | — | Suzie Cracks the Whip |
| 2015 | "Hurricane" (featuring 3OH!3) | — | — | — | — | — | — | — | — | Blow Up The Moon |
"—" denotes releases that did not chart

== Music videos ==
| Year | Video | Director |
|---|---|---|
| 1990 | "But Anyway" | Ken Fox |
| 1993 | "Conquer Me" | David Hogan |
| 1993 | "Defense & Desire" | David Dobkin |
| 1995 | "Run-Around" | Ken Fox |
| 1995 | "Hook" | Frank W. Ockenfels III |
| 1995 | "The Mountains Win Again" | Ken Fox |
| 1996 | "But Anyway" (Kingpin Version) | N/A |
| 1997 | "Carolina Blues" | Frank W. Ockenfels III |
| 1997 | "Most Precarious" | Rent Sidon |
| 1998 | "Canadian Rose" | Marc Webb |
| 2001 | "Girl Inside My Head" | Kevin Kerslake |
| 2008 | "You, Me and Everything" | Daniel Gibbs |
| 2012 | "You Don't Have to Love Me" | Rich Ragsdale |
| 2015 | "Blow Up the Moon" | Will Schmidt |

== Other appearances ==
| Year | Song | Album |
|---|---|---|
| 1995 | "I Want to Take You Higher" | Hempilation: Freedom Is NORML |
| 1995 | "Imagine" | Working Class Hero: A Tribute to John Lennon |
| 1995 | "Secret Agent Man" | Ace Ventura: When Nature Calls |
| 1997 | "Christmas" | A Very Special Christmas 3 |
| 1998 | "Maybe I'm Wrong" | Blues Brothers 2000 |
| 2007 | "Rag Mama Rag" | Endless Highway: The Music of The Band |
