= Cover Yourself =

Studio album by Blues Traveler
- Released: October 30, 2007
- Recorded: 2007
- Genre: Blues rock, jam rock, acoustic
- Length: 47:31
- Label: C3
- Producer: Jim Eno

Blues Traveler chronology
¡Bastardos! (2005)	Cover Yourself (2007)	North Hollywood Shootout (2008)

Professional ratings
Review scores
Source	Rating
AllMusic	3/5 stars

Cover Yourself is Blues Traveler's ninth album, released via C3 Records. It contains previously released songs reworked with acoustic instrumentation and, for some songs, different arrangements from the originals.

== Background ==
As early as 1998, Blues Traveler expressed a desire to release an acoustic album. During writing sessions for the follow-up to their previous album, ¡Bastardos!, the band decided to revisit older material as they were approaching their twentieth anniversary.

Fans were asked for input in the song selection through the band's official website in early 2007. At the band's annual Independence Day concerts at Red Rocks Amphitheatre in 2007, twenty flash drives were randomly distributed throughout the venue. Each included two songs from the upcoming album.

Blues Traveler performed an acoustic set on A&E's Private Sessions, which aired in August 2007. During the interview segments, John Popper mentioned that a possible title for the album would be "Cover Yourself". The band announced a special pre-order offer that included a bonus CD of live tracks. The album was released on October 30, 2007.

== Track listing ==
No.	Title	Writer(s)	Length
1.	"But Anyway"	John Popper, Chan Kinchla	4:13
2.	"Just For Me" (featuring G. Love)	Popper	4:08
3.	"Defense and Desire"	Popper, Bobby Sheehan	4:14
4.	"Hook"	Popper	4:07
5.	"The Mountains Win Again"	Sheehan	4:42
6.	"100 Years"	Popper	4:36
7.	"You Lost Me There"	Popper, Chan Kinchla	4:20
8.	"Runaround"	Popper	4:57
9.	"NY Prophesie"	Popper, Chan Kinchla	3:14
10.	"You Reach Me"	Popper, Tad Kinchla	3:41
11.	"Carolina Blues" (featuring Charlie Sexton)	Popper, Chan Kinchla	5:19
Total length:			47:31
