= Traveler's Blues =

Studio album by Blues Traveler
- Released: October 22, 2021
- Recorded: 2020
- Studio: Sienna Studios, Nashville, TN; The Practice Room, Nashville; Jane's Place, Nashville; Carriage House, Stamford, CT; Royal Studios, Memphis, TN; White Rock Studios, Spring Hill, TN; Lockstock Studio, Nashville
- Genre: Blues rock
- Length: 47:25
- Label: Round Hill
- Producer: Matt Rollings; Josh Gruss (exec.)

Blues Traveler chronology
Hurry Up & Hang Around (2018)	Traveler's Blues (2021)	Traveler's Soul (2023)

Singles from Traveler's Blues
- 1. "Funky Bitch" Released: June 7, 2021; 2. "Ball and Chain" Released: June 7, 2021

Traveler's Blues is the fourteenth studio album by American rock band Blues Traveler, released on October 22, 2021, after originally being scheduled for release on July 30, via Round Hill Records. This album consists of covers of classic blues songs, and features contributions from Crystal Bowersox, Wendy Moten, Christone "Kingfish" Ingram, Rita Wilson, John Scofield, Warren Haynes, The War and Treaty, Mickey Raphael, Keb' Mo', and Jared James Nichols.

Traveler's Blues was nominated for Best Traditional Blues Album at the 64th Annual Grammy Awards in 2022, but lost to Cedric Burnside's I Be Trying.

== Track listing ==
Traveler's Blues
No.	Title	Writer(s)	Original artist	Length
1.	"Funky Bitch"	Frank Seals	Son Seals	4:32
2.	"You Got Me Runnin'" (featuring Crystal Bowersox)	Jimmy Reed	Jimmy Reed	3:22
3.	"Tore Down" (featuring Wendy Moten)	Sonny Thompson	Freddie King	4:43
4.	"Ball and Chain" (featuring Christone "Kingfish" Ingram)	Big Mama Thornton	Big Mama Thornton	5:47
5.	"Crazy" (featuring Rita Wilson and John Scofield)	Brian Burton; Thomas Callaway; Gian Piero Reverberi; Gian Franco Reverberi	Gnarls Barkley	4:29
6.	"Sittin' on the Top of the World" (featuring Warren Haynes)	Chester Burnett	Howlin' Wolf	5:20
7.	"Need Your Love So Bad" (featuring The War and Treaty)	William Edward John; John Mertis Jr.	Little Willie John	4:09
8.	"Roadhouse Blues" (featuring Mickey Raphael)	John Paul Densmore; Robby Krieger; Raymond Manzarek; Jim Morrison	The Doors	4:25
9.	"Call Me the Breeze"	John W. Cale	JJ Cale	3:41
10.	"Trouble in Mind" (featuring Keb' Mo')	Richard M. Jones	Thelma La Vizzo	3:28
11.	"Keep Your Light on Mama" (featuring Jared James Nichols)	Nichols; Joseph Anthony Perry	Jared James Nichols	3:23
Total length:				47:25

== Personnel ==
=== Blues Traveler ===
- John Popper – lead vocals, harmonica
- Brendan Hill – drums, percussion
- Chan Kinchla – guitar
- Ben Wilson – piano, Hammond B3, clavinet, wurlitzer
- Tad Kinchla – bass guitar

=== Additional performers ===
- Wendy Moten – vocals (1, 3)
- Crystal Bowersox – vocals (2)
- Christone "Kingfish" Ingram – vocals and guitar (4)
- Rita Wilson – vocals (5)
- John Scofield – guitar (5)
- Eric Darken – percussion (5, 8, 9, 10)
- Matt Rollings – backing vocals (5, 9)
- Warren Haynes – vocals and slide guitar (6)
- The War and Treaty – vocals (7)
- Mickey Raphael – harmonica (8)
- Keb' Mo' – vocals and slide guitar (10)
- Jared James Nichols – vocals and guitar (11)

=== Technical personnel ===
- Matt Rollings – producer, engineering
- Ryan Hewitt – mixing, engineering
- Buckley Miller – recording
- Zaq Reynolds – assisting
- Sean Williamson – assisting
- Josh Gruss – executive producer
- Eric Boulanger – mastering
- Tony Castle – engineering
- Boo Mitchell – engineering
- Ian Callahan – engineering
- Peter Young – engineering
- Eric Darken – engineering

== Charts ==
Chart (2021)	Peak position
US Top Blues Albums (Billboard)	1
US Top Current Album Sales (Billboard)	63
