= Live from the Fall =

Live From the Fall

Live album by Blues Traveler
- Released: July 2, 1996
- Recorded: Fall 1995
- Genre: Rock
- Length: 141:24
- Label: A&M

Professional ratings
Review scores
Source	Rating
AllMusic	link
Entertainment Weekly	D link
Rolling Stone	link

Live From the Fall is American jam band Blues Traveler's first live album, released on July 2, 1996. It presents highlights of the band's autumn 1995 tour on two discs.

== Track listing ==
">" indicates a segue directly into the next track.

=== Disc one ===
1. "Love and Greed" (Chan Kinchla, John Popper) – 5:15
2. "Mulling It Over" > (Kinchla, Popper) – 8:04
3. "Closing Down the Park" (Kinchla, Popper) – 12:55
4. "Regarding Steven" (Popper) – 4:42
5. "NY Prophesie" (Kinchla, Popper) – 5:14
6. "100 Years" (Popper) – 4:59
7. "Crash Burn" (Kinchla, Popper) – 3:24
8. "Gina" (Popper, Kinchla) – 6:45
9. "But Anyway" (Kinchla, Popper) – 5:55
10. "Mountain Cry" (Brendan Hill) – 15:17

=== Disc two ===
Abbreviated titles (one or two words each) are used in the liner notes to indicate the songs on this disc.

1. "Alone" (Popper) – 15:43
2. "Freedom" (Popper) – 4:15
3. "The Mountains Win Again" (Bobby Sheehan) – 5:42
4. "What's for Breakfast" (Popper, Sheehan)– 4:02
5. "Go Outside and Drive" > (Popper) – 9:06
6. "Low Rider" > (War)
  "Go Outside and Drive" > – 10:48
7. "Run-Around" (Popper) – 4:35
8. "Sweet Talking Hippie" (Hill, Kinchla, Popper, Sheehan)
  "Imagine" (John Lennon) – 19:46

== Song information ==
"Closing Down the Park" is a song about the Tompkins Square Park Riot. No studio recording of it has ever been released outside of a demo.

A studio version of "Regarding Steven" is included on the CD single for "Run-Around."

The performance of "Alone" contains a previously unreleased bridge section which later became part of the song "Traveler Suite" from Decisions of the Sky.

The "Go / Low / Go / Run" medley includes snippets from the following non-Blues Traveler songs: "Linus and Lucy," "Tequila," "Loser," "Inchworm," and "La Bamba."

"Sweet Talking Hippie" and "Imagine" are included on the same track, but both are standalone performances without a segue from one to the other.

"Sweet Talking Hippie" includes a snippet from the "Galop Infernal," composed by Jacques Offenbach for the operetta Orpheus in the Underworld.

== Charts ==
Chart (1996)	Peak position
US Billboard 200	46

== Certifications ==
Region	Certification	Certified units/sales
United States (RIAA)	Platinum	1,000,000^{^}
^{^} Shipments figures based on certification alone.
