= Travelogue: Blues Traveler Classics =

Compilation album by Blues Traveler
- Released: November 12, 2002
- Genre: Rock
- Length: 79:43
- Label: A&M
- Producer: Mike Ragogna

Travelogue: Blues Traveler Classics is a compilation album by American rock band Blues Traveler, released in 2002. It is composed of the band's greatest hits from before they were dropped by A&M Records.

Professional ratings
Review scores
Source	Rating
Allmusic	4.5/5 stars
The Rolling Stone Album Guide	2/5 stars

== Track listing ==
All songs by John Popper except where noted.

1. "But Anyway" (Chan Kinchla, John Popper) – 4:09
2. "Gina" (Kinchla, Popper) – 4:03
3. "Mulling It Over" (Kinchla, Popper) – 3:44
4. "100 Years" – 3:43
5. "Optimistic Thought" – 3:30
6. "Sweet Pain" – 7:42
7. "Mountain Cry" (Brendan Hill) – 9:08
8. "Love & Greed" (Kinchla, Popper) – 4:15
9. "Conquer Me" (Bob Sheehan, Popper) – 5:09
10. "Run-Around" – 4:40
11. "Regarding Steven" – 4:44
12. "The Mountains Win Again" (Sheehan) – 5:05
13. "Crash Burn" (Kinchla, Popper) – 2:59
14. "Hook" – 4:50
15. "Carolina Blues" (Kinchla, Popper) – 4:44
16. "Canadian Rose" – 4:31
17. "Just for Me" – 3:05

== Personnel ==
- John Popper – Vocals, harmonica, 12-string guitar, Irish whistle (on "Conquer Me")
- Chan Kinchla – Guitar
- Bobby Sheehan – Bass
- Brendan Hill – Drums, percussion
- Tad Kinchla – Bass on "Just for Me"
- Ben Wilson – Keyboards on "Just for Me"
- Gregg Allman – Hammond organ, vocals on "Mountain Cry"
- Joan Osborne – Backing vocals on "100 Years"
- Paul Shaffer – Keyboards/organ on "Conquer Me"
- Warren Haynes – Slide guitar on "The Mountains Win Again"
- Arnie Lawrence – Soprano saxophone on "100 Years"
