= 25 (Blues Traveler album) =

Compilation album by Blues Traveler
- Released: March 6, 2012
- Recorded: 1987–2012
- Genre: Blues rock
- Label: A&M

25 is a compilation album by American rock band Blues Traveler celebrating their 25th anniversary. It was released on March 6, 2012. The album's first disc is a greatest hits retrospective and the second contains a mix of rarities, including B-sides, a demo, unreleased studio tracks, and a remix of "Run-around".

== Track listing ==
All songs by John Popper except where noted.

Disc 1: Greatest Hits

1. "Run-Around" – 4:40
2. "Hook" – 4:50
3. "The Mountains Win Again" (Sheehan) – 5:05
4. "But Anyway" (Chan Kinchla, Popper) – 4:09
5. "You, Me and Everything" – 4:21
6. "Amber Awaits" (Kinchla/Popper/Wilson) – 3:47
7. "After What" (Popper/Wilson) – 3:34
8. "Back in the Day" (Blues Traveler) – 4:01
9. "Girl Inside My Head" (Blues Traveler) – 3:36
10. "Carolina Blues" (Kinchla, Popper) – 4:44
11. "Let Her and Let Go" (Kinchla/Popper) – 3:39
12. "Gina" (Kinchla, Popper) – 4:03
13. "100 Years" – 3:43
14. "What's for Breakfast" (Popper/Sheehan) – 3:45
15. "NY Prophesie" (Kinchla/Popper) – 4:35
16. "Unable to Get Free" (Kinchla/Popper/Wilson) – 4:23
17. "How You Remember It" – 4:06
18. "What I Got" (Sublime cover) – 2:51

Disc 2: B-sides/Unreleased

1. "The Demon"
2. "The Poignant & Epic Saga of Featherhead & Lucky Lack"
3. "Blue Hour"
4. "Trust in Trust" (demo)
5. "Didn't Mean to Wake Up"
6. "But Anyway '88"
7. "Random Amounts"
8. "Twelve Swords" (from Decisions of the Sky) – 3:20
9. "The Sun and the Storm" (from Decisions of the Sky) – 7:58
10. "Traveler Suite" (from Decisions of the Sky) – 20:17
11. "Run-Around" (Gunslinger Remix)

== Personnel ==
- John Popper – Vocals, harmonica, 12-string guitar
- Chan Kinchla – Guitar
- Bobby Sheehan, Tad Kinchla – Bass
- Brendan Hill – Drums, percussion
- Ben Wilson – Keyboards
- Joan Osborne – Backing vocals on "100 Years"
- Warren Haynes – Slide guitar on "The Mountains Win Again"
- Arnie Lawrence – Soprano saxophone on "100 Years"

== Charts ==
Chart (2012)	Peak position
US Top Current Albums (Billboard)	170
