= Hurry Up & Hang Around =

Studio album by Blues Traveler
- Released: October 12, 2018
- Studios: Sound Emporium (Nashville, Tennessee)
- Length: 44:49
- Label: BMG
- Producer: Matt Rollings

Blues Traveler chronology
Blow Up the Moon (2015)	Hurry Up & Hang Around (2018)	Traveler's Blues (2021)

Singles from Hurry Up & Hang Around
- 1. "Accelerated Nation" Released: July 6, 2018

Hurry Up & Hang Around is the thirteenth studio album by American jam band Blues Traveler, released on October 12, 2018. The album was produced by Matt Rollings and released through BMG Rights Management. The album's lead single, "Accelerated Nation", was released on July 6, 2018, with a lyric video for the song being released through YouTube days later.

== Track listing ==
Hurry Up & Hang Around
No.	Title	Writer(s)	Length
1.	"Accelerated Nation"	Chan Kinchla; John Popper	3:04
2.	"She Becomes My Way"	Popper	3:51
3.	"The Touch She Has"	C. Kinchla; Popper	4:22
4.	"When You Fall Down"	Ben Wilson	3:32
5.	"The Wolf is Bumpin'"	Tad Kinchla; Popper	3:48
6.	"Daddy Went A-Giggin'"	Brendan Hill; C. Kinchla; T. Kinchla; Popper; Wilson	3:43
7.	"Tangle of Our Dreaming"	T. Kinchla; Popper	3:36
8.	"More Than Truth"	C. Kinchla; Popper	3:02
9.	"Prayer Upon the Wind"	Popper	2:20
10.	"Miss Olympus"	Wilson	4:02
11.	"Phone Call from Leavenworth"	Chris Whitley	4:35
12.	"Ode from the Aspect"	Popper	4:55
Total length:			44:49

== Personnel ==
- John Popper – lead vocals, backing vocals, harmonica
- Brendan Hill – drums, percussion
- Chan Kinchla – acoustic guitar, electric guitar
- Ben Wilson – piano, organ, keyboards, backing vocals
- Tad Kinchla – bass guitar, backing vocals

== Charts ==
Chart (2018)	Peak position
US Independent Albums (Billboard)	14
US Top Album Sales (Billboard)	72
US Top Current Album Sales (Billboard)	65
