= Pete Kovachevich =

American singer-songwriter

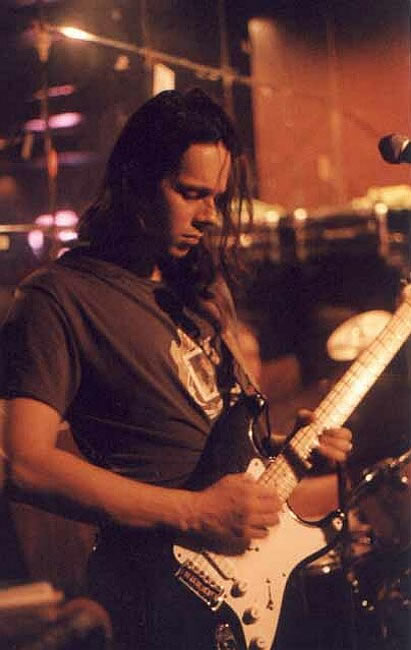
Pete Kovachevich in 1997 Photo © Steve Eichner

Peter Malcolm "Pete" Kovachevich, is an American guitar player, singer, songwriter. He is known for his bluesy and aggressive style, reminiscent to Stevie Ray Vaughan and Jimi Hendrix. He has played with popular jam bands like Blues Traveler, Spin Doctors, and Warren Haynes, and he became a staple in the New York jam scene, playing Fridays at a small club, Nightingales, with his bands First House and Kindred Spirit.

== Early years ==
Kovachevich is from the south side of Chicago, Illinois. He started playing with the sons of Chicago jazz master Ramsey Lewis in the 1980s, having met Frayne and Bobby Lewis at Chicago High School of Performing Arts.

=== Kindred Spirit ===
Peter Kovachevich's first band in New York City was Kindred Spirit. It was the first of Kovachevich's bands to play at the Nightingale bar.

Kindred Spirit was founded in 1990 by Ted Meyer (drums), J. Jorrin (bass) Sheldon Landa (piano) and Kovachevich (guitar). KS was handed down a tues. night that was famous for nurturing huge names. Kindred Spirit enjoyed the endorsement and played with several NYC jam band scene Illuminati including God Street Wine, The Authority, Spin Doctors, Widespread Panic, Phish, The Worms, The Jono Manson Band, Xanax 25, Milo Z, Comfort, Blues Traveler, Gov't Mule, The Dreyer Bros, The Choosy Mothers, innerSoul. This period of time marks an era in NYC, when there were several live music venues and a vibrant scene of bands and styles. This was from 1991 to 1996. Kindred Spirit featured Sheldon Landa on Piano and had a very piano-dominant sound in their jams, yet maintained the classic Kovachevich, funky original rock sound. Having some problems keeping Kindred Spirit together, in 1996, Bass player David Hamburger quit Kindred Spirit to join The Dreyer Bros and Kovachevich brought on Jack Desantis on bass from Xanax 25. Kindred Spirit's drummer was Neil Nunziato

=== Playing with Blues Traveler ===
Kovachevich traveled on tour with Blues Traveler for nine weeks. He also played on Blues Traveler's album, Four, playing sitar, tambura, shruti box and other instruments.

=== First House ===
After a successful tour with Blues Traveler, Kovachevich quit Kindred Spirit after the tour and began The First House which featured Pawel Maciwoda on bass and David Schlossberg on drums. First House did bold spontaneous shows on the street all over the states and most notably in New Orleans during Mardi Gras, where they also played with The Radiators. First House was known to attract massive crowds on the street and police would often show up and break up the shows. Pavel Macivoda was in First House from 1996 to 1997. In 1997, long-time friend of both David and Kovachevich, Kenji Hino joined First House on stage as the full-time bass player. It was this lineup that became the notorious late night First House, with shows known to start at 1 or 2 am and go until 5 am. First House released an album, First House.

First House broke up shortly after their road manager was found dead by Kovachevich one early morning after a gig. Everyone tried to carry on after this event, but it later proved too difficult. First House played their last gig in NYC @ Nightingales, Sept. 1999. Rumors of a reunion have been floating around for sometime, but Kenji Hino now lives in Japan permanently.

== Personal life ==
Kovachevich resides in NYC. He also has lived in Chicago, Maui, California Portland. He has a youtube channel that features his art and music.
