= Blues Traveler (album) =

Studio album by Blues Traveler
- Released: May 1990
- Recorded: February 19 – March 3, 1990
- Length: 56:10
- Label: A&M
- Producer: Justin Niebank

Blues Traveler chronology
Blues Traveler (1990)	Travelers and Thieves (1991)

Professional ratings
Review scores
Source	Rating
AllMusic	4.5/5 stars
The Rolling Stone Album Guide	3/5 stars

Blues Traveler, the debut album by Blues Traveler, was released on A&M Records in 1990. The album features "jam structures on basic blues riffs" focused around the harmonica playing of band leader John Popper, which writer William Ruhlmann said gave the band a more focused sound than that of the Grateful Dead.

== Track listing ==
1. "But Anyway" (Chan Kinchla, John Popper) – 4:10
2. "Gina" (Kinchla, Popper) – 4:03
3. "Mulling It Over" (Kinchla, Popper) – 3:43
4. "100 Years" (Popper) – 3:43
5. "Dropping Some NYC" (Kinchla, Popper, Bobby Sheehan) – 3:19
6. "Crystal Flame" (Kinchla, Popper) – 9:39
7. "Slow Change" (Kinchla, Popper) – 4:54
8. "Warmer Days" (Popper) – 4:55
9. "Gotta Get Mean" (Brendan Hill, Kinchla, Popper) – 3:49
10. "Alone" (Popper) – 7:33
11. "Sweet Talking Hippie" (Hill, Kinchla, Popper, Sheehan) – 6:22

== Personnel ==
Blues Traveler

- John Popper – lead vocals, harmonica, 12-string acoustic guitar
- Chan Kinchla – guitar
- Bobby Sheehan – bass
- Brendan Hill – drums, percussion

Additional personnel

- Chris Barron, Justin Niebank, Kevin Traynor – backing vocals on "Dropping Some NYC"
- Joan Osborne – backing vocals on "100 Years" and "Warmer Days"
- Howie Wyeth – piano on "Warmer Days"
- Arnie Lawrence – soprano saxophone on "100 Years"

== Charts ==
Chart (1991)	Peak position
US Billboard 200	136

== Certifications ==
Region	Certification	Certified units/sales
United States (RIAA)	Gold	500,000^{^}
^{^} Shipments figures based on certification alone.
