= Save His Soul =

Studio album by Blues Traveler
- Released: April 6, 1993
- Genre: Rock
- Length: 67:13
- Label: A&M
- Producer: Dave Swanson; Blues Traveler

Blues Traveler chronology
Travelers & Thieves (1991)	Save His Soul (1993)	Four (1994)

Singles from Save His Soul
- 1. "Conquer Me" Released: June 29, 1993; 2. "Defense & Desire" Released: 1993

Professional ratings
Review scores
Source	Rating
AllMusic	2.5/5 stars
Entertainment Weekly	B
The Rolling Stone Album Guide	3/5 stars

Save His Soul is the third studio album by American jam band Blues Traveler, released on April 6, 1993, by A&M Records.

== Track listing ==
">" indicates a segue directly into the next track.

1. "Trina Magna" (John Popper) – 5:49
2. "Love and Greed" (Chan Kinchla, Popper) – 4:14
3. "Letter from a Friend" (Popper, Bobby Sheehan) – 4:39
4. "Believe Me" (Kinchla, Popper) – 3:33
5. "Go Outside and Drive" > (Popper) – 4:50
6. "Defense & Desire" (Popper, Sheehan) – 3:58
7. "Whoops" (Popper) – 8:17
8. "Manhattan Bridge" (Kinchla) – 2:47
9. "Love of My Life" (Popper) – 5:39
10. "NY Prophesie" (Kinchla, Popper) – 4:35
11. "Save His Soul" (Brendan Hill) – 3:12
12. "Bullshitter's Lament" > (Popper) – 3:28
13. "Conquer Me" > (Popper, Sheehan) – 5:09
14. "Fledgling" (Popper) – 7:25

== Personnel ==
- John Popper – vocals, harmonica, electric and 12-string acoustic guitars, Irish whistle, string arrangements
- Bobby Sheehan – bass guitar
- Brendan Hill – percussion, drums
- Chan Kinchla – electric and 12-string acoustic guitars
- Paul Shaffer – Hammond organ
- Avram Lavinsky – string arrangements

Background vocals:

- Pamela Landrum
- Pat Bickham
- Cher Levis
- Mari Serpas

Strings:

- Clay Ruede
- Mitchell Stern
- Roberta Cooper
- Ronald Carbone
- Jeff Carney

== Charts ==
Chart (1993)	Peak position
US Billboard 200	72

== Certifications ==
Region	Certification	Certified units/sales
United States (RIAA)	Gold	500,000^{^}
^{^} Shipments figures based on certification alone.

== Miscellaneous ==
- "Letter from a Friend" was written for Dave Graham, the son of famed music promoter Bill Graham, following his death in 1991.
- "Defense and Desire" is about the Nightingale Bar in Manhattan.
- Kyle Duke is the child featured on the album cover.
- In the liner notes, Popper is also listed as "playing" a 12-gauge shotgun and a 9 mm pistol; a gunshot is heard at the end of "Save His Soul."
