= The John Popper Project =

American jam band

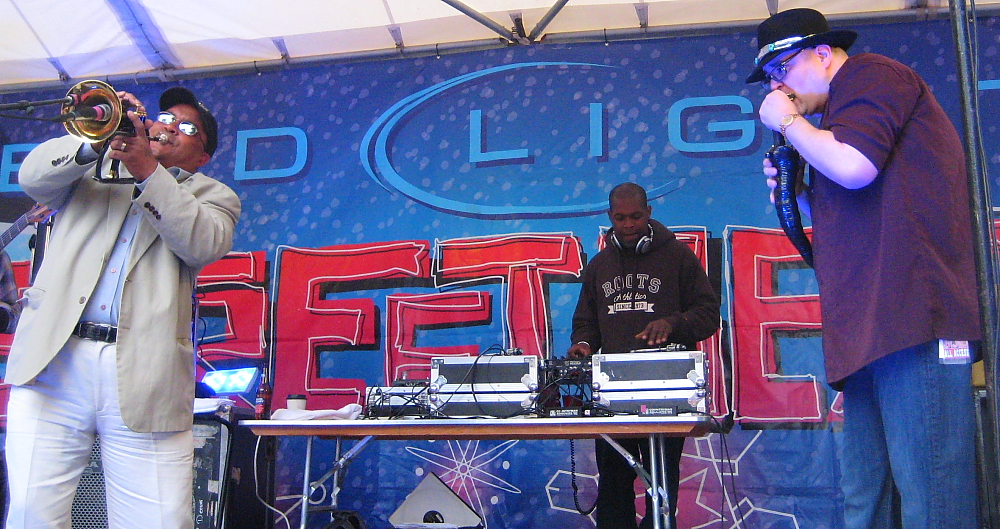
- The John Popper Project performing in 2008

Background information
- Origin: United States
- Years active: 2003–present
- Labels: Relix
- Members: John Popper; DJ Logic; Tad Kinchla; Marcus Bleecker

The John Popper Project (formally the John Popper Project Featuring DJ Logic) is an American jam band that plays a combination of rock, hip-hop, and improvisational jazz. Its lineup consists of John Popper of Blues Traveler on vocals and harmonica, DJ Logic on turntables, Tad Kinchla on bass guitar, and Marcus Bleecker on drums.

The group formed out of a jam session in San Francisco in December 2003 that featured Popper, Rob Wasserman of RatDog, and DJ Logic. They released a self-titled album in October 2006 and toured extensively across the United States in 2006 and 2007.

== Band members ==
- John Popper – vocals, harmonica
- DJ Logic – turntables
- Tad Kinchla – bass
- Marcus Bleecker – drums
