= Xanax (disambiguation) =

Xanax is the trade name of the drug alprazolam.

Xanax may also refer to:

- Xanax (band), a Serbian musical group
- Xanax the Magician, a character in TV series Galavant played by Ricky Gervais
- Xanax, a song by Lindsay Lohan

== See also ==
- Xanax 25, an American alternative rock group
