= Straight On till Morning =

Straight On till Morning may refer to:

- Straight On till Morning (album), a 1997 album by Blues Traveler
- Straight On till Morning (film), a 1972 British thriller
