= Travelers and Thieves =

Studio album by Blues Traveler
- Released: September 3, 1991
- Recorded: 1991
- Studio: Master Sound (Astoria, Queens); RPM Studios (Manhattan)
- Genre: Rock, blues-rock, folk rock
- Length: 61:25
- Label: A&M
- Producer: Jim Gaines; Blues Traveler

Blues Traveler chronology
| Blues Traveler (1990) | Travelers and Thieves (1991) | Save His Soul (1993) |

Singles from Travelers and Thieves
- 1. "All in the Groove" Released: 1991; 2. "Sweet Pain" Released: 1991; 3. "Mountain Cry" Released: 1992

Professional ratings
Review scores
| Source | Rating |
|---|---|
| Allmusic | link |
| Chicago Tribune | link |
| Robert Christgau | C− |
| The Rolling Stone Album Guide | 3/5 stars |

Travelers and Thieves is Blues Traveler's second studio album, released on A&M Records in 1991. The album was released in two different versions: an album-only version, and an extremely limited two-CD pressing. The bonus disc was called On Tour Forever. On iTunes the album is listed only as Travelers due to the full name being split across two drawings, one on the cover and one inside the CD liner notes.

The liner notes include a poem titled "Of Travelers & Thieves," written by Jonathan Sheehan, brother of bassist Bobby Sheehan.

== Track listing ==
1. "The Tiding" (Brendan Hill, Chan Kinchla, John Popper, Bobby Sheehan) – 1:30
2. "Onslaught" (Popper, Sheehan) – 6:08
3. "Ivory Tusk" (Kinchla, Popper) – 5:15
4. "What's for Breakfast" (Popper, Sheehan) – 3:45
5. "I Have My Moments" (Kinchla, Popper) – 4:12
6. "Optimistic Thought" (Popper) – 3:28
7. "The Best Part" (Popper) – 4:49
8. "Sweet Pain" (Popper) – 7:41
9. "All in the Groove" (Popper) – 4:15
10. "Support Your Local Emperor" (Kinchla, Popper, Sheehan) – 6:54
11. "Bagheera" (Hill, Kinchla, Popper) – 4:21
12. "Mountain Cry" (Hill) – 9:07

== Personnel ==
Blues Traveler

- John Popper – vocals, harmonica, 12-string acoustic guitar, calymba, various barks, squeaks, growls and whistles
- Chan Kinchla – electric guitar, 6-string acoustic guitar
- Bobby Sheehan – bass
- Brendan Hill – drums, percussion

Guest performers

- Gregg Allman – Hammond B3 and vocals on "Mountain Cry"
- Chris Barron – backing vocals on "All in the Groove"

== Charts ==
| Chart (1991) | Peak position |
|---|---|
| US Billboard 200 | 125 |

== Certifications ==
| Region | Certification | Certified units/sales |
|---|---|---|
| United States (RIAA) | Gold | 500,000^{^} |
^{^} Shipments figures based on certification alone.
