= Featherhead =

Featherhead may refer to:

- Brain Featherhead, a fictional character in the Stare-Out animated sketches
- Featherhead (Blues Traveler), a fictional character in the song "The Poignant and Epic Saga of Featherhead and Lucky Lack"
- Prince Featherhead, a fictional character created by Andrew Lang
