= On Tour Forever =

Live album by Blues Traveler
- Released: 1992
- Recorded: New Haven, Connecticut, October 30, 1991; San Francisco, California, September 29, 1991
- Genre: Rock
- Length: 47:40
- Label: A&M

On Tour Forever is a live EP released by Blues Traveler in 1992. Only 10,000 copies were produced and packaged as a double album with the band's second album, Travelers and Thieves.

The first three tracks were recorded at The Palace Theater in New Haven, Connecticut on October 30, 1991. The last track, featuring Carlos Santana on guitar, was recorded at Golden Gate Park in San Francisco, California on September 29, 1991.

The recording included a tribute to Bill Graham, the band's tour promoter, who died shortly after the release of Travelers and Thieves.

== Track listing ==
1. "The Tiding" > "Onslaught" - 8:12
2. "Crystal Flame" - 14:08
3. "Optimistic Thought" - 4:06
4. "Mountain Cry" (with Carlos Santana) - 21:14

== Concert Recordings ==
- Blues Traveler Live at Palace Theatre on October 30, 1991
- Blues Traveler Live at Polo Field, Golden Gate Park on September 29, 1991
