= LEAA =

The abbreviation LEAA may stand for:

- Law Enforcement Alliance of America
- Law Enforcement Assistance Administration
- The Lambert azimuthal equal-area projection of a sphere
