= Four (Blues Traveler album) =

Studio album by Blues Traveler
- Released: September 13, 1994
- Recorded: 1993–94
- Studios: Bearsville (Woodstock, New York)
- Genre: Rock
- Length: 56:47
- Label: A&M
- Producers: Michael Barbiero; Steve Thompson

Blues Traveler chronology
Save His Soul (1993)	Four (1994)	Straight On till Morning (1997)

Singles from Four
- 1. "Run-Around" Released: February 28, 1995; 2. "Hook" Released: August 29, 1995; 3. "The Mountains Win Again" Released: 1995

Professional ratings
Review scores
Source	Rating
AllMusic	4/5 stars
Entertainment Weekly	B+
The Music Box	4/5 stars
The Rolling Stone Album Guide	2/5 stars

Four (stylized as four) is the fourth album by American rock band Blues Traveler, released on September 13, 1994. Blues Traveler broke into the mainstream following the release of Four.

Four peaked at No. 8 on the Billboard 200 albums chart and is most known for its hits "Run-Around" and "Hook", which charted at No. 8 and 23, respectively, on the Billboard Hot 100. Both songs also charted in the top 20 on the Mainstream Rock and Modern Rock charts. According to the RIAA, the album is certified as 6× Platinum (6 million copies sold in the U.S.). "Run-Around" won the 1995 Grammy Award for Best Rock Performance by a Duo or Group.

== Track listing ==
1. "Run-Around" (John Popper) – 4:40
2. "Stand" (Popper) – 5:19
3. "Look Around" (Popper) – 5:42
4. "Fallible" (Chan Kinchla, Popper) – 4:47
5. "The Mountains Win Again" (Bobby Sheehan) – 5:06
6. "Freedom" (Popper, Sheehan) – 4:01
7. "Crash Burn" (Kinchla, Popper) – 2:59
8. "Price to Pay" (Kinchla, Popper) – 5:17
9. "Hook" (Popper) – 4:49
10. "The Good, the Bad and the Ugly" (Kinchla, Popper, Sheehan, Brendan Hill) – 1:55
11. "Just Wait" (Popper) – 5:34
12. "Brother John" (Kinchla, Popper, Sheehan) – 6:38

== Personnel ==
Blues Traveler

- Brendan Hill – percussion, drums
- Chan Kinchla – electric and acoustic guitar, mandolin, backing vocals on "Brother John"
- John Popper – vocals, harmonica, 12-string guitar on "Look Around"
- Bobby Sheehan – bass guitar, backing vocals on "Brother John"

Additional musicians

- Adam Brody – backing vocals
- Warren Haynes – slide guitar on "The Mountains Win Again"
- Bashiri Johnson – percussions
- Chuck Leavell – piano, keyboards
- Jono Manson – vocals on "Brother John"
- Paul Shaffer – Hammond B-3 organ on "Stand"
- Pete Kovachevich – Shruti box, tambora, tanpura on "Stand"

Technical personnel

- Greg Arnold – assistant engineering
- Michael Barbiero – production, engineering
- John Darren Greene – cover art
- Steve Thompson – production

== Charting singles ==
"Run-Around" peaked at No. 2 on the Adult Top 40 chart in 1995, and "Hook" peaked at No. 8 on the Mainstream Top 40 chart in 1996.

== Charts ==
=== Weekly charts ===
Chart (1994–1995)	Peak position
Canada Top Albums/CDs (RPM)	12
US Billboard 200	8

=== Year-end charts ===
Chart (1995)	Position
US Billboard 200	29
Chart (1996)	Position
US Billboard 200	35

== Certifications ==
Region	Certification	Certified units/sales
Canada (Music Canada)	2× Platinum	200,000^{^}
United States (RIAA)	6× Platinum	6,000,000^{^}
^{^} Shipments figures based on certification alone.
