= Stolen Ogre =

American rock band

- Origin: Seattle, Washington, United States
- Genres: Rock, jam
- Label: Shadowhawk
- Members: Michael McMorrow; Pamela Tobiason; David Simpson; Scott Adams; Marc Willett; Rick Boice; Brendan Hill
- Website: http://www.stolenogre.com

Stolen Ogre is an American rock band based in Seattle, Washington. Michael McMorrow and Blues Traveler drummer Brendan Hill formed the group after they met on the H.O.R.D.E. tour in the mid-1990s.

The band's current members are lead singer-songwriter Pamela Tobiason, keyboardist/songwriter Michael McMorrow, guitarist David Simpson, saxophonist/singer the Reverend Scott "Junior" Adams, bassist Marc Willett and drummer Rick Boice. Brendan Hill's Traveler duties eventually led him to stop his regular appearances with the group, although he went on to record with the band on Road To Jericho and still remains a creative collaborator.

The band takes its name from a child's doll that Hill spotted on the roadside of the German Autobahn. Christened 'Ogre', and enthroned on Hill's drum kit, it became his good luck mascot through Blues Traveler's early years. After Ogre vanished on tour, McMorrow, Hill and company adopted the name in playful tribute to the circumstances.

== Road To Jericho ==
In the spring of 2004, Stolen Ogre released their first full-length album Road to Jericho on the Seattle-based Shadowhawk Records. Two songs, "Jericho" and "Love Me Alone" went on to receive airplay nationwide.

=== Critical reception ===
Pennsylvania's WVIA-FM had the album on the charts for eight weeks with it peaking at No. 2 for two weeks. Enigma Magazine noted of the CD, "Bottom line it's rock, folk, jam and pop all mixed together into one big happy concoction."

Stolen Ogre played its debut New York City show at the famed Lion's Den with The Village Voice giving the show a "Recommended" note by writer Richard Gehr. The band continued on with shows at the legendary Asbury Park club The Saint and NYC's Acme Underground. The Northeast swing and Road to Jericho were highlighted in both www.Jambands.com and www.Jambase.com.

After Relix Magazine President and Publisher Steve Bernstein and other Relix staffers saw the Stolen Ogre set at Lion's Den, the band was invited to play a private mid-day concert the magazine's home office in Manhattan. A live recording of that show hit www.archive.org; Stolen Ogre remained in the Top 5 downloaded shows for over a month with nearly 4000 downloads.

== Other releases ==
The band released its first Christmas single "Little Drummer Boy" to AAA & NPR radio.

Stolen Ogre is currently writing songs for the follow-up to Road to Jericho and are in planning for the next tour and festival dates.

In 2007 new material from Stolen Ogre is being recorded at Robert Lang Studios in Seattle, including a brand new McMorrow composition "Tequila Mockingbird" that features John Popper.
