= Live on the Rocks =

Live album by Blues Traveler
- Released: July 13, 2004
- Recorded: July 4, 2003; Red Rocks Amphitheatre, Colorado
- Genre: Rock; Reggae; Psychedelic rock
- Label: Sanctuary
- Producer: Dan Russo; Meg Harkins

Professional ratings
Review scores
Source	Rating
Allmusic	3.5/5 stars

Live on the Rocks is a live album by rock band Blues Traveler, recorded at their annual Red Rocks Independence Day shows in 2003.

== Track listing ==
Note: ' > ' denotes a segue into the next song.

1. "Carolina Blues"
2. "You Lost Me There"
3. "No Woman, No Cry" (with Ziggy Marley)
4. "Save His Soul"
5. "Hook"
6. "Let Her and Let Go"
7. "Support Your Local Emperor" >
8. "This Ache"
9. "Eventually"
10. "Unable to Get Free"
11. "Can't See Why" >
12. "You Reach Me" >
13. "Crash Burn"
14. "Thinnest of Air"
