= But Anyway =

1990 song by Blues Traveler

Single by Blues Traveler

from the album Blues Traveler
- Released: May 1990
- Recorded: Feb–March 1990
- Genre: Rock
- Length: 4:10
- Label: A&M
- Songwriters: Chan Kinchla, John Popper

"But Anyway" is a song by the jam band Blues Traveler, and the lead track on their 1990 eponymous debut album, Blues Traveler. The song peaked at number 5 on the Adult Alternative Airplay chart on 12 July 1996, and at number 24 on the Billboard Mainstream Top 40 on 30 August 1996.

== Music video ==
The music video features footage of Blues Traveler performing the song at different concert venues, switching between close-ups of band members and short clips from the 1996 comedy Kingpin, in which Blues Traveler performed "But Anyway" during the closing credits while dressed in traditional Amish clothing.

== Charts ==
Chart (1996)	Peak position
US Adult Alternative Airplay (Billboard)	5
US Mainstream Top 40 (Billboard)	24
US Cash Box Top 100	57
