= Decisions of the Sky: A Traveler's Tale of Sun and Storm =

EP by Blues Traveler
- Released: October–November 2000
- Recorded: Austin, Texas
- Genre: Rock
- Length: 37:49
- Label: Blues Traveler Publishing
- Producer: Brendan Hill

Blues Traveler chronology
Straight On till Morning (1997)	Decisions of the Sky: A Traveler's Tale of Sun and Storm (2000)	Bridge (2001)

Professional ratings
Review scores
Source	Rating
AllMusic	Link

Decisions of the Sky: A Traveler's Tale of Sun and Storm is a collection of four studio tracks by Blues Traveler. The songs were released online as a free digital EP album in the fall of 2000.

== Background ==
The EP was the first official release from the band after the death of bassist Bobby Sheehan and the subsequent addition of two new members. Prior to Sheehan's death, the band was planning to release a concept album called The Sun, The Storm and the Traveler. That album was abandoned and Decisions of the Sky was released in its place.

The songs outline the story which was intended for the full-length album. In it, a young man goes to war while struggling with an internal emotional conflict over his relationship with a girl. The title is taken from the song "Decision of the Skies" (released on the Blues Traveler album Bridge) which was intended for the original concept album.

The first three tracks were released commercially in 2012 on the Blues Traveler retrospective compilation release 25. A live version of the final track, "The Path", was included on the band's album Live: What You and I Have Been Through and as a b-side on various sampler CDs.

== Track listing ==
1. "12 Swords" – 3:20
2. "The Sun and the Storm" – 7:58
3. "Traveler Suite" – 20:17
  - I. The Intro
  - II. Setting Sun
  - III. Color Me Gone
  - IV. A Low Branch
  - V. Pancho
  - VI. A Low Branch (Reprise)
  - VII. Color Me Gone (Reprise)
  - VIII. Setting Sun (Reprise)
4. "The Path" – 6:14

The tracks were released on the band's website in October and November 2000, one per week.

At one point, the band planned to also make the album available commercially as a CD release with an extra fifth track, but this was rejected by their record label.

"The Sun and the Storm" is one of very few Blues Traveler songs that has never been performed live.

== Artwork ==
The release of each track was accompanied by artwork from Rich Homburger depicting the theme of that song.
