= Suzie Cracks the Whip =

Studio album by Blues Traveler
- Released: June 26, 2012
- Genre: Rock
- Length: 42:33
- Label: 429

Blues Traveler chronology
North Hollywood Shootout (2008)	Suzie Cracks the Whip (2012)	Blow Up the Moon (2015)

Singles from Suzie Cracks the Whip
- 1. "You Don't Have To Love Me" Released: May 2012

Suzie Cracks the Whip is American jam band Blues Traveler's eleventh studio album, released on June 26, 2012.

The album debuted at #91 on the Billboard 200, the band's highest position on the chart since 2001.

== Track listing ==
1. "You Don't Have to Love Me" (Aaron Beavers) – 3:43
2. "Recognize My Friend" (John Popper, Brendan Hill, Ron Sexsmith) – 3:48
3. "Devil in the Details" (Popper, Chan Kinchla, Sexsmith) – 3:55
4. "All Things Are Possible" (Popper, C. Kinchla) – 3:34
5. "Things Are Looking Up" (Popper, Tad Kinchla, Sexsmith) – 4:24
6. "Love Is Everything (That I Describe)" (Popper, Sexsmith) – 2:21
7. "I Don't Wanna Go" (Popper, Carrie Rodriguez) – 3:51
8. "Nobody Fall in Love With Me" (Popper) – 3:10
9. "Cover Me" (Ben Wilson) – 3:27
10. "Saving Grace" (Chris Barron) – 3:42
11. "Big City Girls" (Popper, T. Kinchla, Wilson, Beavers) – 3:27
12. "Cara Let the Moon" (Popper) – 3:26

== Personnel ==
- John Popper – Harmonica, Vocals
- Chan Kinchla – Acoustic and Electric Guitars, Mandolin
- Ben Wilson – Keyboards
- Tad Kinchla – Bass
- Brendan Hill – Percussion, Drums
- With: Crystal Bowersox – Backing Vocals on "I Don't Wanna Go"

== Charts ==
Chart (2012)	Peak position
US Billboard 200	91
US Top Current Album Sales (Billboard)	81
US Top Rock Albums (Billboard)	38
