= Blow Up the Moon =

Studio album by Blues Traveler
- Released: April 7, 2015
- Recorded: 2014–15
- Genre: Rock
- Label: Loud & Proud

Blues Traveler chronology
Suzie Cracks the Whip (2012)	Blow Up the Moon (2015)	Hurry Up & Hang Around (2018)

Singles from Blow Up the Moon
- 1. "Hurricane" Released: March 30, 2015

Blow Up the Moon is the twelfth studio album by American rock band Blues Traveler, released on April 7, 2015. Every track on the album was recorded as a collaboration; guests on the album include 3OH!3, JC Chasez, The Dirty Heads, Rome Ramirez, Hanson, Plain White T's, Thompson Square, Secondhand Serenade, New Hollow, Jewel, Bowling for Soup, and Thomas Ian Nicholas.

== Critical reception ==
Professional ratings
Review scores
Source	Rating
AllMusic	2/5 stars

Stephen Thomas Erlewine of AllMusic described the album as "pleasingly bizarre, a pandering time capsule bound to satisfy no one", stating that "in some ways, a record this monumentally odd is better than a good record."

== Track listing ==
1. "Hurricane" (featuring 3OH!3) – 3:44
2. "Blow Up the Moon" (featuring 3OH!3 and JC Chasez) – 4:30
3. "Castaway" (featuring The Dirty Heads and Rome Ramirez) – 3:10
4. "Vagabond Blues" (featuring The Dirty Heads and Rome Ramirez) – 3:05
5. "Top of the World" (featuring Hanson) – 4:21
6. "Nikkia's Prom" (featuring Plain White T's) – 3:32
7. "Matador" (featuring Thompson Square) – 4:01
8. "I Can Still Feel You" (featuring Thompson Square) – 4:12
9. "The Darkness We All Need" (featuring Secondhand Serenade) – 3:54
10. "Jackie's Baby" (featuring New Hollow) – 4:18
11. "Hearts Are Still Awake" (featuring Jewel) – 3:44
12. "I Know Right" (featuring Bowling for Soup) – 3:30
13. "Right Here Waiting for You" (featuring Bowling for Soup) – 3:15
14. "All the Way" (featuring Thomas Ian Nicholas) – 3:37

== Charts ==
Chart (2015)	Peak position
US Independent Albums (Billboard)	29
US Top Rock Albums (Billboard)	47
