= Jared James Nichols =

American musician (born 1989)

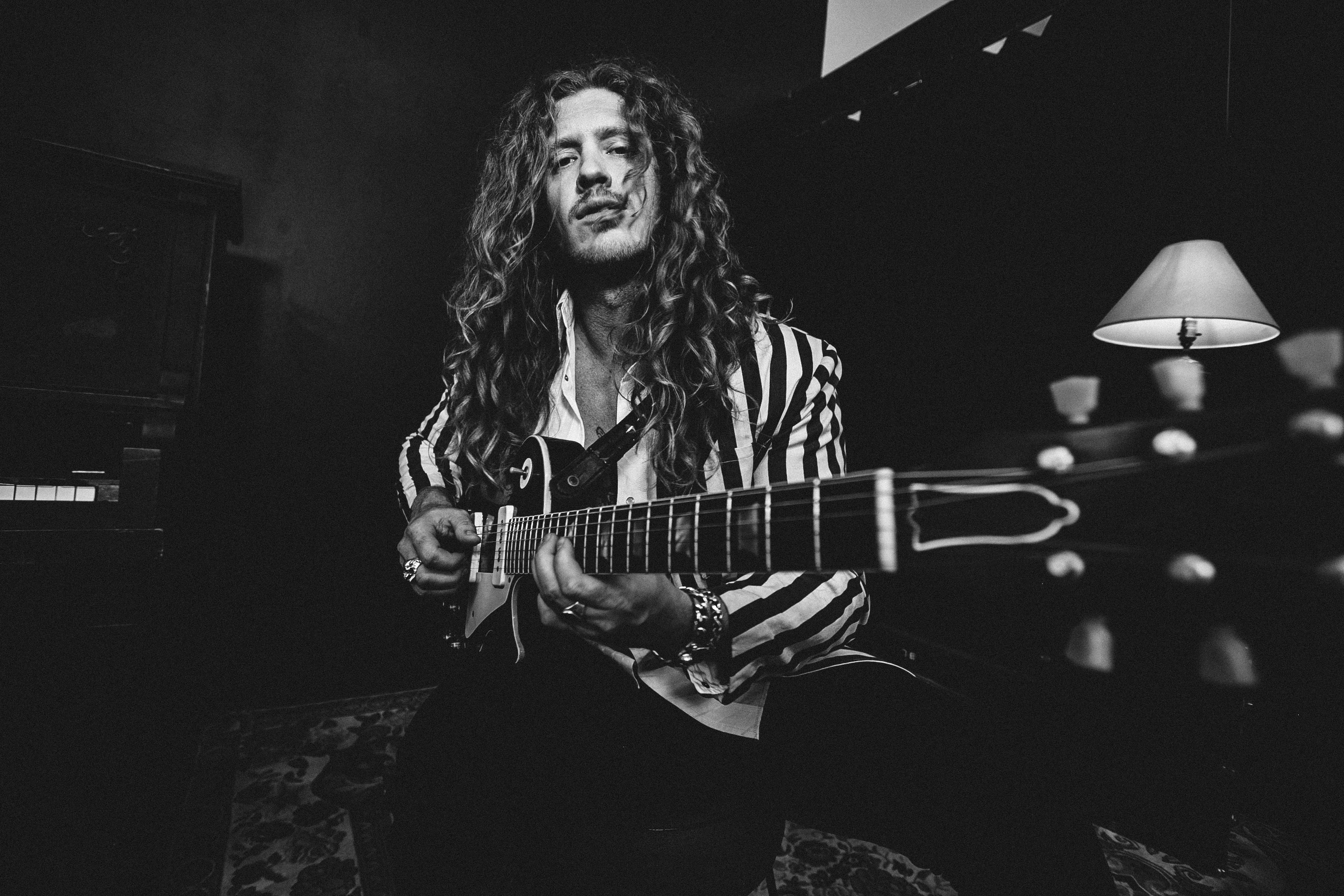

Background information
- Born: March 14, 1989 (age 37); Waukesha, Wisconsin, U.S.
- Genres: Hard rock; blues rock
- Instruments: Guitar, vocals
- Years active: 2013–present
- Label: Listenable Records: Black Hill Records
- Website: jaredjamesnichols.com

Jared James Nichols (born March 14, 1989) is an American blues-rock guitarist and singer from East Troy, Wisconsin, best known for his high-energy "pick-less" electric guitar playing technique. He is rarely seen playing without his signature single-pickup Epiphone Les Paul Custom P90 nick-named Old Glory or his vintage original 1953 Gibson Les Paul nick-named Ole Red. He fronts a power trio under his name, rooted in the early 1970s hard-rock vein of Cream and Mountain. He resides in Nashville, Tennessee.

== Career ==
Nichols moved to Los Angeles in 2010. He won the Gibson Les Paul Tribute Contest as well as the Musicians Institute Most Outstanding Player Award. He formed his own trio shortly thereafter and released a 3-song EP Live at the Viper Room.

After this release, Nichols toured America and played various clubs/festivals including Sturgis Buffalo Chip, SXSW, Freakout Festival, Summerfest, and more. It was during this time he opened for Kid Rock, Lynyrd Skynyrd and ZZ Top. In Spring 2014, he embarked on a 2-month European Tour which proved to be successful, resulting in 2015 full-length release Old Glory & The Wild Revival recorded with producers Warren Huart and Eddie Kramer.

In early 2016, Music Radar named Jared as one of the "Top Upcoming Guitar Players in the World". Around the same time, Nichols was featured in a "mini-doc" series UNCHARTED by Honda and UPROXX about his guitar playing and determination to further himself in the music industry. The documentary went viral online, resulting in over seven million views within one month of its premier.

He has also recorded at studios such as Abbey Road, EastWest Studios, La Fabrique, Dave Grohl's Studio 606, Sunset Sound, and Swinghouse.

Nichols has toured across America and Europe with acts including Blue Öyster Cult, Fozzy, Glenn Hughes, John 5 and the Creatures, L.A. Guns, Living Colour, Saxon, Walter Trout, UFO, and Zakk Wylde.

Nichols has performed with many of his musical heroes including Joe Bonamassa, Peter Frampton, Billy Gibbons, Slash, Steve Vai, Leslie West, and Zakk Wylde.

His second full-length album Black Magic was released in October 2017.

In July 2019, Nichols released the single "Nails in the Coffin". The single premiered on BBC Radio 2 as well as heavy A-List Rotation on the UK's Planet Rock Radio.

March 2020 saw Nichols release the single "Threw Me To The Wolves" in conjunction with his debut headline European tour. The single received rave reviews in the industry, touting the single as his best work to date. Premiering on BBC Radio 2 on the "Radio 2 Rock Show" in England, as well as "Pirate Rock Radio" in Sweden.

Nichols was named as a global ambassador for Gibson Guitars in June 2021. Jared is one of four guitarists to now be given this title, the other three being Lzzy Hale, Slash, and Dave Mustaine.

In 2021 Nichols released his new single “Skin ‘n Bone” on June 7 as well as a music video for it and announced that he would be releasing his EP Shadow Dancer on September 17, 2021.

== Equipment ==
Nichols is endorsed by Gibson/Epiphone, Seymour Duncan, Marshall Amplification, and DR strings. Jared primarily plays his signature Les Paul nicknamed "Old Glory" fitted with a single Seymour Duncan P-90 in the bridge position. In January 2019, Nichols unveiled his signature Epiphone "Old Glory" Les Paul. In 2021, Epiphone released a new iteration of the "Old Glory" Les Paul called "Gold Glory," featuring a gold sparkle finish.

Nichols is known for his use of P90 pickups. He prefers vintage Gibson P90s, or new reproductions by Seymour Duncan.

In January 2019, Jared collaborated with British company Blackstar Amplification to develop a signature amplifier, the JJN20.

Nichols has several vintage Gibson Les Pauls that he uses. One is a 1953 Les Paul goldtop named "Ole Red" due to a red paintjob the guitar has. Nichols considers this guitar particularly special as his father, who was born in 1953, signed the instrument before his death. In 2021, Nichols came into possession of a Les Paul that had suffered severe tornado damage, and realized it was a 1952 model due to the screw layout on the bridge pickup. Nichols named the guitar "Dorothy" after Dorothy Gale from The Wonderful Wizard of Oz and asked luthier Joel Wilkens to restore the guitar to a playable state. The body only needed a little wood and additional binding around the neck joint, but Wilkens had to create a new neck because the original one had been destroyed. Wilkens made sure to keep everything as period-accurate as possible, but in order to reflect the guitar's misadventure, he added a tornado design to the back of the headstock and did not restore the finish.

== Band members ==
- Jared James Nichols – guitars, lead vocals
- Ryan Rice – drums, backing vocals
- Brian Weaver – bass, backing vocals

== Discography ==
| Year | Artist | Title | Notes |
|---|---|---|---|
| 2015 | Jared James Nichols | Old Glory & The Wild Revival | Album |
| 2016 | Jared James Nichols | Highwayman | EP |
| 2017 | Jared James Nichols | Black Magic | Album |
| 2019 | Jared James Nichols | "Nails in the Coffin" | Single |
| 2020 | Jared James Nichols | "Threw Me to the Wolves" | Single |
| 2021 | Jared James Nichols | "Skin 'n Bone" | Single |
| 2021 | Jared James Nichols | "Bad Roots" | Single |
| 2021 | Jared James Nichols | Shadow Dancer | EP |
| 2023 | Jared James Nichols | Jared James Nichols (self-titled) | Album |
| 2026 | Jared James Nichols | Louder Than Fate | Album |

=== Singles ===
| Title | Year | Peak chart positions | Album |
| Title | Year | US Main. | Album |
|---|---|---|---|
| "Down the Drain" | 2022 | 34 | Jared James Nichols |
