= ¡Bastardos! =

Studio album by Blues Traveler
- Released: September 13, 2005
- Recorded: Austin, TX
- Genre: Rock
- Length: 56:29
- Label: Vanguard
- Producer: Jay Bennett

Blues Traveler chronology
Truth Be Told (2003)	¡Bastardos! (2005)	Cover Yourself (2007)

Singles from ¡Bastardos!
- 1. "Amber Awaits" Released: August 2005

Professional ratings
Review scores
Source	Rating
AllMusic	4.5/5 stars
Rolling Stone	2/5 stars

¡Bastardos! is the eighth studio album by American jam band Blues Traveler released on September 13, 2005, and produced by Jay Bennett (formerly of Wilco).

The band stated in an interview years ago that they wanted to name an album "Those Bastards!"; that manifested in this album's title.

== Track listing ==
1. "You Can't Stop Thinking About Me" (Chan Kinchla, John Popper) – 4:24
2. "Amber Awaits" (Chan and Tad Kinchla, Popper) – 3:47
3. "After What" (Popper, Ben Wilson) – 3:34
4. "Money Back Guarantee" (Popper, Wilson) – 3:48
5. "Can't Win True Love" (Popper) – 4:57
6. "Nail" (Popper, Wilson) – 3:06
7. "Leaning In" (Popper, Wilson) – 3:48
8. "She and I" (Tad Kinchla, Popper) – 4:51
9. "Rubberneck" (Tad Kinchla, Popper) – 3:11
10. "Nefertiti" (Tad Kinchla, Popper) – 4:15
11. "What Could Possibly Go Wrong" (Chan Kinchla, Popper) – 2:47
12. "That Which Doesn't Kill You" (Chan Kinchla, Popper) – 4:12
13. "She Isn't Mine" (Popper) – 3:18
14. "The Children of the Night" (Brendan Hill, Popper) – 6:31

== Personnel ==
- John Popper – harmonica, vocals
- Chan Kinchla – electric and acoustic guitars, mandolin
- Brendan Hill – percussion, drums
- Tad Kinchla – bass
- Ben Wilson – keyboards
- Jay Bennett – production, guitar, percussion
- Teresa Cole – backing vocals
- Carlos Sosa – saxophone
- Fernando Castillo – trumpet
- Raul Vallejo – trombone

== ¡Bastardos en Vivo! ==
On August 29, 2006, ¡Bastardos en Vivo!, an EP containing live recordings of several songs from ¡Bastardos!, was released. It also includes a rendition of the Charlie Daniels Band's southern rock song, "The Devil Went Down to Georgia".

== Charts ==
Chart (2005)	Peak position
US Independent Albums (Billboard)	49
