= Truth Be Told (Blues Traveler album) =

Studio album by Blues Traveler
- Released: August 5, 2003
- Recorded: February–April 2003
- Genre: Rock
- Length: 47:33
- Label: Sanctuary
- Producer: Don Gehman

Blues Traveler chronology
Bridge (2001)	Truth Be Told (2003)	¡Bastardos! (2005)

Professional ratings
Review scores
Source	Rating
AllMusic	4.5/5 stars
Entertainment Weekly	B−
The Rolling Stone Album Guide	3/5 stars

Truth Be Told is American jam band Blues Traveler's seventh studio album, released on August 5, 2003.

== Track listing ==
1. "Unable to Get Free" (Chan Kinchla, John Popper, Ben Wilson) – 4:23
2. "Eventually (I'll Come Around)" (Chan Kinchla, Popper) – 3:51
3. "Sweet and Broken" (Christopher Barron, Popper) – 3:49
4. "My Blessed Pain" (Chan Kinchla, Popper) – 4:35
5. "Let Her and Let Go" (Tad Kinchla, Popper) – 3:39
6. "Thinnest of Air" (Brendan Hill, Popper) – 3:35
7. "Can't See Why" (Tad Kinchla, Popper) – 3:14
8. "Stumble and Fall" (Chan Kinchla, Popper) – 4:59
9. "This Ache" (Popper, Wilson) – 4:06
10. "Mount Normal" (Popper) – 4:04
11. "The One" (Chan Kinchla, Popper) – 3:42
12. "Partner in Crime" (Tad Kinchla, Popper) – 3:36

== Personnel ==
- John Popper – vocals, guitar, harmonica
- Chan Kinchla – electric and acoustic guitars, mandolin, backing vocals
- Tad Kinchla – bass
- Ben Wilson – keyboards
- Brendan Hill – drums, percussion

== Charts ==
Chart (2003)	Peak position
US Billboard 200	147
