= Bridge (Blues Traveler album) =

Studio album by Blues Traveler
- Released: May 8, 2001
- Recorded: 2000
- Genre: Rock
- Length: 53:47
- Label: A&M
- Producer: Matt Wallace

Blues Traveler chronology
Decisions of the Sky: A Traveler's Tale of Sun and Storm (2000)	Bridge (2001)	Truth Be Told (2003)

Professional ratings
Aggregate scores
Source	Rating
Metacritic	(56/100)
Review scores
Source	Rating
AllMusic	4/5 stars
Blender	2/5 stars
Chicago Tribune	(favorable)
Entertainment Weekly	B
LA Weekly	(unfavorable)
Rolling Stone	3/5 stars
Wall of Sound	(65/100)

Bridge is the sixth studio album by American jam band Blues Traveler, released in May 2001. The record is the band's first since the 1999 death of original bassist, Bobby Sheehan, and the first to include new members Tad Kinchla and Ben Wilson on bass and keyboards, respectively. It is also the last to be released on A&M Records.

The original title for the album was Bridge Out of Brooklyn.

== Track listing ==
All tracks by Blues Traveler

1. "Back in the Day" – 4:01
2. "Girl Inside My Head" – 3:36
3. "Rage" – 6:07
4. "Just for Me" – 3:04
5. "You Reach Me" – 4:27
6. "All Hands" – 5:06
7. "Pretty Angry (for J. Sheehan)" – 6:59
8. "The Way" – 4:38
9. "You Lost Me There" – 4:09
10. "Sadly a Fiction" – 4:16
11. "You're Burning Me" – 2:44
12. "Decision of the Skies" – 4:27

== Personnel ==
- John Popper – vocals, harmonica
- Brendan Hill – drums, percussion
- Chan Kinchla – guitars
- Tad Kinchla – bass
- Ben Wilson – keyboards
- Warren Haynes – slide guitar

== Charts ==
Chart (2001)	Peak position
US Billboard 200	91
