= North Hollywood Shootout (album) =

Studio album by Blues Traveler
- Released: August 26, 2008
- Recorded: Feb 2007; Early 2008
- Genres: Rock, psychedelic rock
- Length: 42:05
- Label: Verve Forecast
- Producer: David Bianco

Blues Traveler chronology
Cover Yourself (2007)	North Hollywood Shootout (2008)	Suzie Cracks the Whip (2012)

Professional ratings
Review scores
Source	Rating
AllMusic	2.5/5 stars
Paste	6/10

North Hollywood Shootout is American jam band Blues Traveler's tenth studio album, released on August 26, 2008, and produced by David Bianco. In a notable departure from previous Blues Traveler releases, the album includes a spoken word piece featuring Bruce Willis.

This album marked the band's return to Universal Music Group, which owns their previous label A&M Records, and also their current label, Verve Forecast Records (along with the catalog of Sanctuary Records, another label the band was on at one point).

== History ==
During early writing and production of this album, the members of Blues Traveler began to experiment with re-arrangements of various older songs, and put this album on hold to record Cover Yourself for their twentieth anniversary. The recording sessions for the two albums were held back-to-back.

== Track listing ==
No.	Title	Length
1.	"Forever Owed"	4:43
2.	"You, Me and Everything"	4:21
3.	"Love Does"	3:31
4.	"Borrowed Time"	3:38
5.	"The Beacons"	3:14
6.	"Orange in the Sun"	3:53
7.	"What Remains"	4:48
8.	"How You Remember It"	4:06
9.	"The Queen of Sarajevo"	4:01
10.	"Free Willis (Ruminations from Behind Uncle Bob's Machine Shop)"	5:51
11.	"The Landing" (iTunes exclusive)
12.	"Alleviate" (Japan exclusive)

Early reports cite the disc as having 11 tracks, but the supposedly official track listing released to amazon.com had only 10 tracks listed on it. However, a later version of the track listing released on the Barnes and Noble website included the supposedly missing 11th track (apparently track 10), "The Landing," along with a 30-second sample of the song. "The Landing" eventually became an iTunes exclusive song.

== Personnel ==
- John Popper - vocals, harmonica
- Chandler Kinchla - guitars
- Ben Wilson - keyboards
- Tad Kinchla - bass
- Brendan Hill - drums
- Bruce Willis - vocals, harmonica on "Free Willis"
- Dave Ralicke - baritone, Tenor and Alto Sax
- Jordan Katz - trumpet

== See also ==
- North Hollywood shootout
