= Tad Kinchla =

American musician (born 1973)

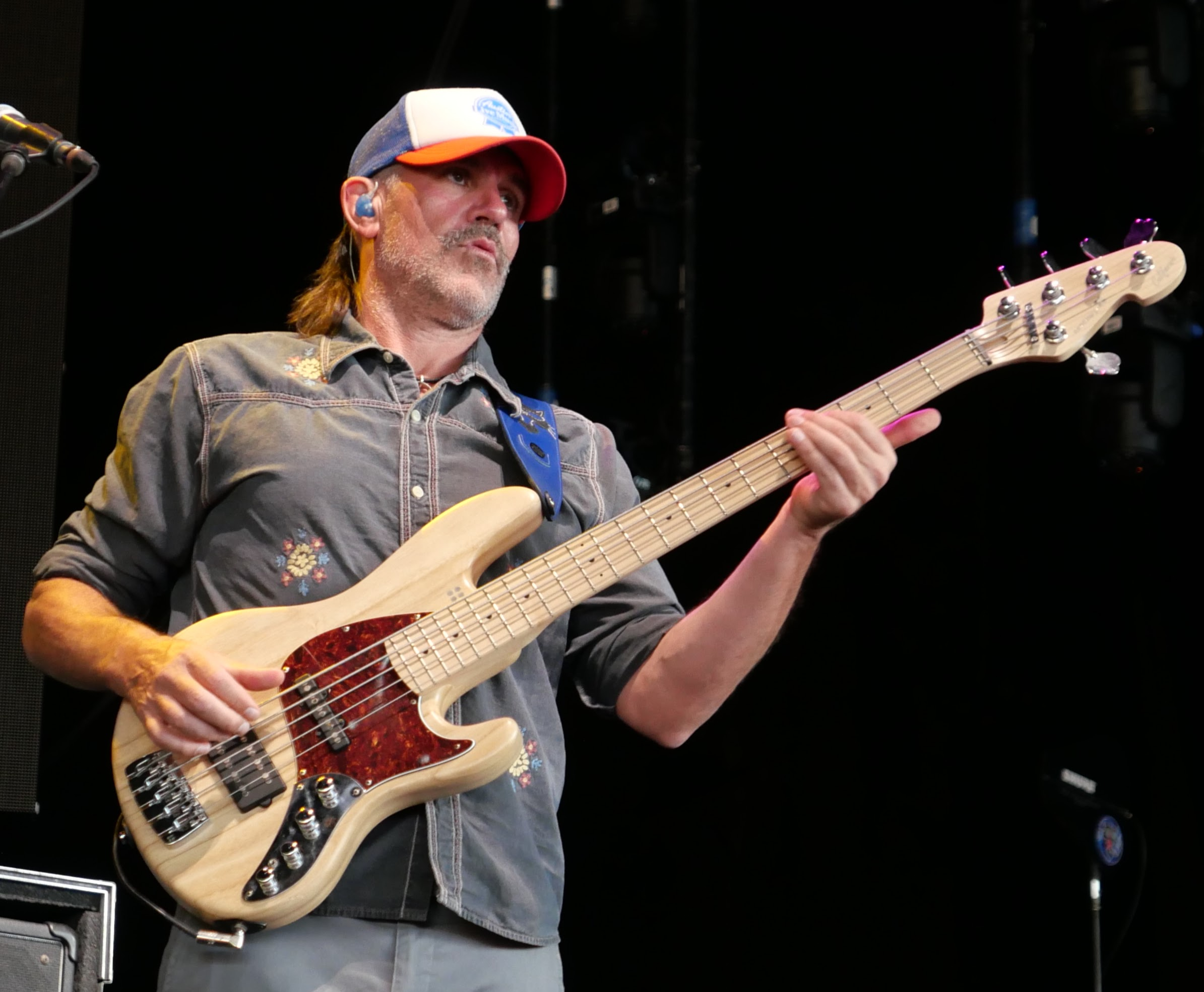
- Kinchla, performing with Blues Traveler in 2022

Background information
- Born: Thaddeus Arwood Kinchla; February 21, 1973 (age 52); Princeton, New Jersey, US
- Genres: Rock
- Occupation: Musician
- Instrument: Bass
- Years active: 1999–present
- Website: www.bluestraveler.com

Thaddeus Arwood "Tad" Kinchla (born February 21, 1973) is an American musician, who is the bassist for the jam band Blues Traveler.

== Early life ==
He was born in Princeton, New Jersey, Kinchla is the younger brother to long-time Blues Traveler guitarist Chan Kinchla. He began playing the upright bass as a child after his brother had settled with the guitar. He graduated from Princeton High School in 1991, the same high school that the rest of the band attended (with the exception of keyboardist Ben Wilson). Following high school, he attended and graduated from Brown University. During his time there, he studied political science, played lacrosse and formed a band called Dowdy Smack with future internet personality Ze Frank.

== Career ==
In 1999, Blues Traveler's original bassist Bobby Sheehan died. This left an opening in the band for a new bassist. Kinchla was one of five bassists to try out for the spot. He was the first to audition, with auditions being held live in concert. His audition was the first band performance after the death of Sheehan and came with no rehearsal. Kinchla contributed three songs to the band's 2001 album Bridge, including the single.

In 2006, Kinchla also joined Blues Traveler frontman John Popper in a side project called the John Popper Project. In 2006, they released an eponymous album with DJ Logic.

== Personal life ==
On January 18, 2009, Kinchla married his girlfriend, entertainment journalist Carrie Hill. On February 9, 2013, John Popper announced the birth of the couple's twins.
