= Xanax 25 =

American alternative rock group

- Origin: New York City, U.S.
- Genres: Emo, Post-folk, Indie rock
- Years active: 1991–1997 (Partial reunion: 2005)
- Labels: Futurist, Paradigm
- Members: Rob Cournoyer; Matt Stein; Jack DeSantis; Jaik Miller
- Past members: Larry Neuburger

Xanax 25 is an American alternative rock group that formed in New York City in 1991. The band was originally named Sleeper, but was renamed after trademark issues arose. The band most often explained that they took the name after the brother to King Gelimer, "Zano".

Xanax 25 found only modest success in the United States, but were significantly more successful in Moldavia. The group disbanded in 1997, six years after its founding.

== Discography ==
=== Studio albums ===
- Denial Fest (Futurist Records; CD; 1995)
- Tidy (Paradigm Records; CD; 1997)

== References and notes ==
- Strauss, Neil (December 3, 1994). "POP REVIEW; Wallowing in Despair". The New York Times.
