= Straight On till Morning (album) =

Straight On Till Morning

Studio album by Blues Traveler
- Released: July 1, 1997
- Genre: Rock
- Length: 65:27
- Label: A&M
- Producer: Steve Thompson, Michael Barbiero

Blues Traveler chronology
Four (1994)	Straight On Till Morning (1997)	Decisions of the Sky: A Traveler's Tale of Sun and Storm (2000)

Singles from Straight On till Morning
- 1. "Carolina Blues" Released: 1997; 2. "Most Precarious" Released: 1997; 3. "Canadian Rose" Released: January 13, 1998

Straight On till Morning is the fifth album by American jam band Blues Traveler. It was released in July 1997 (see 1997 in music). The title of the album, and the accompanying cover art, are from the directions to Neverland, as given by Peter Pan in J.M. Barrie's Peter Pan (1904/1911): "Second star to the right and straight on 'til morning." It is the last of the band's albums to feature bassist Bobby Sheehan, who died of a drug overdose in 1999.

== Critical reception ==
Professional ratings
Review scores
Source	Rating
AllMusic	3.5/5 stars
Chicago Tribune	2/4 stars
Entertainment Weekly	B
Rolling Stone	3/5 stars

AllMusic's Stephen Thomas Erlewine found some criticism in the band's loose musicianship and John Popper's vocal delivery but gave praise to the "succinct and eclectic" track listing containing multiple genres and catchy pop hooks that appeases both the band's "jam-oriented cult following" and their newly gained "hook-happy fans", concluding that: "Straight on Till Morning is the first studio record that captures the essence of the band." Entertainment Weekly writer Jim Farber noted the band's jam guitar riffs and percussion beats being more grounded into "appealingly long melodies", Popper's signature harmonica playing and "blithe delivery" of "cute and self-deprecating" humor remain as highlights and the "overall perkiness" throughout the album avoids the musical quirks of Phish and Dave Matthews Band, concluding that: "Like the modest period pieces they recall, Blues Traveler’s boogies offer a happy little buzz." Don McLeese of Rolling Stone called the album "sprawlingly ambitious", highlighting "Great Big World" for showcasing the band's trademark instrumentation to its fullest, saying that "such high-powered musicianship supports the sort of melodic momentum that'll grab the ears of those more interested in songs than jams." Conversely, Pat Rooney of the Chicago Tribune said: "With complex arrangements, lush melodies and dreamy imagery, Straight On Till Morning supports the group's reputation for upbeat vibes and improvisational jams. But though the musicianship runs deep, the songcraft comes up short."

== Track listing ==
No.	Title	Writer(s)	Length
1.	"Carolina Blues"	John Popper, Chan Kinchla	4:44
2.	"Felicia"	Popper	4:42
3.	"Justify the Thrill"	Popper, Kinchla	4:06
4.	"Canadian Rose"	Popper	4:31
5.	"Business as Usual"	Popper, Brendan Hill, Kinchla	5:17
6.	"Yours"	Popper	6:34
7.	"Psycho Joe"	Popper, Bobby Sheehan	3:55
8.	"Great Big World"	Popper, Hill	5:37
9.	"Battle of Someone"	Popper	6:03
10.	"Most Precarious"	Popper	3:27
11.	"The Gunfighter"	Popper, Kinchla	4:57
12.	"Last Night I Dreamed"	Kinchla	4:10
13.	"Make My Way"	Popper	7:24

== Personnel ==
Adapted credits from the liner notes of Straight On till Morning.

- John Popper – harmonica, vocals, 12-string acoustic guitar on "Yours"
- Brendan Hill – drums, percussion
- Chan Kinchla – guitars
- Bobby Sheehan – bass
- Warren Haynes – slide guitar
- Michael Barbiero – engineer

== Charts ==
=== Weekly charts ===
Chart (1997)	Peak position
US Billboard 200	11

=== Year-end charts ===
Chart (1997)	Position
US Billboard 200	140

== Certifications ==
Region	Certification	Certified units/sales
Canada (Music Canada)	Gold	50,000^{^}
United States (RIAA)	Platinum	1,000,000^{^}
^{^} Shipments figures based on certification alone.

== Singles ==
Year	Single	Chart	Position
1997	"Most Precarious"	Modern Rock Tracks	25
1997	"Most Precarious"	Mainstream Rock Chart	27
1997	"Carolina Blues"	Modern Rock Tracks	30
1997	"Carolina Blues"	Mainstream Rock Chart	4
