= Law Enforcement Alliance of America =

US non-profit organization

- Type: Non-profit organization under IRS Code Section 501(c)(4)
- Board of directors: James J. Fotis, Executive Director
- Main organ: The LEAA Advisor
- Website: leaa.org

The Law Enforcement Alliance of America (LEAA) is a non-profit, conservative gun rights corporation in the United States, headquartered just outside Washington, D.C., in Springfield, Virginia. Its membership is composed of active duty and retired law enforcement officers, crime victims, and other interested civilians.

LEAA publishes a magazine, Shield, and a newsletter, "The LEAA Advisor". It works to highlight incidents of civilian self-defense like that in which Harry Beckwith interrupted seven criminals in the process of stealing firearms from his gun store, ensuring six of them could be safely arrested by police.

The Law Enforcement Alliance of America is a non-profit organization under IRS Code Section 501(c)(4). Due to LEAA's legislative activities, contributions to LEAA are not tax-deductible as a donation or business expense. Dues and contributions are not refundable.

Critics have said that the organization is a "stealth PAC", funneling corporate monies into state judicial elections. The organization was sued in Texas in 2002 for allegedly failing to disclose campaign contributors.

In 2002, LEAA spent $1.5-2 million to air ads against Democratic candidate Kirk Watson's bid for Texas Attorney General. At the time, they also spent money in support of two other Democratic candidates' bids for the Texas State Legislature, one of whom was Mike Head. In 2003, Watson and Head filed a complaint in state court, accusing LEAA of using corporate funds in a political campaign in violation of Texas law. LEAA contends the ads were legal and did not coordinate directly with any candidate's campaign. In 2007, Buck Wood, the attorney for the plaintiffs, said that he was to pursue the litigation in federal court.
