= Hook (song) =

1995 single by Blues Traveler

Single by Blues Traveler

from the album Four
- Released: August 29, 1995
- Studio: Bearsville (Woodstock, New York)
- Genre: Rock
- Length: 4:49; 4:18 (edit)
- Label: A&M
- Songwriter: John Popper
- Producers: Steve Thompson; Michael Barbiero

Blues Traveler singles chronology
"Run-Around" (1995)	"Hook" (1995)	"The Mountains Win Again" (1995)

"Hook" is a song by American rock band Blues Traveler, from their fourth studio album, Four (1994). The title of the song is a reference to the term hook, a short musical riff that is used in popular music to make a song appealing and to "catch the ear of the listener". The lyrics are a commentary on the banality and vacuousness of successful pop songs, making "Hook" both a hit song and a satire of a hit song. Commercially, "Hook" peaked at number 23 on the US Billboard Hot 100 and number 40 on the Canadian RPM 100 Hit Tracks chart.

== Structure ==
The chord progression of "Hook" is very similar to the basic structure of Pachelbel's Canon in D, (D-A-Bm-F♯m-G-D-G-A, or I-V-vi-iii-IV-I-IV-V), but transposed to the key of A major. This chord progression is widely used in popular music, often as the hook, leading to other satirical takes on the use of this chord structure.

There are several allusions in the song, one to the story of Peter Pan and his nemesis Captain Hook: "no matter how much Peter loved her, what made the Pan refuse to grow, was that the Hook brings you back".

== Satire ==
The first chorus of the song's lyrics, aimed directly at the listener, assert that the lyrical content of any song is effectively meaningless, as the song's musical hook will keep listeners coming back, even if they are unaware of the reason. In the introduction, John Popper sings:

"It doesn't matter what I say / So long as I sing with inflection / That makes you feel that I'll convey / Some inner truth or vast reflection."

The second verse admits the singer is "being insincere" and describes how the lyrics are intended to manipulate the listener. These lyrics are a satirical take on the formulaic way much popular music is generated. Further on during the bridge, the lyrics become even more blatant by criticizing MTV and claiming formulaic music is an easy way to make money: "When I'm feeling stuck and need a buck / I don't rely on luck, because / the hook brings you back..."

The musically "lazy" chord structure viewed in combination with the meta-lyrics reveal the true extent of what a critic for The A.V. Club describes as song's "genius": "the commentary is a big joke about how listeners will like just about anything laid on top of the chords of the infinitely clichéd Pachelbel canon, even lyrics that openly mock them for liking it."

== Music video ==
The music video was directed by Frank W. Ockenfels and depicts a man, played by game show host Ken Ober, channel surfing through late-night television. He first watches a beauty pageant whose contestants lip sync the song as the host (erroneously credited as Milton Berle on IMDb) interviews them. For the second verse, a character modeled after Charles Foster Kane lip syncs at a campaign rally. The band appears in each of these segments, then plays the bridge of the song in the man's apartment, with John Popper taking his place on the couch. During the final portion of the song, the man starts changing channels quickly, often returning to see Paul Shaffer lip sync the lyrics and play keyboard with the band. Finally the man turns off his TV set and starts to read a book about the American Civil War.

Shaffer was bandleader for Late Night with David Letterman, which gave Blues Traveler critical early exposure. Shaffer contributed backing keyboards to "Stand," another track on Four. During the final sequence of channel changes, several split-second clips from the video for the previous single "Run-Around" are seen.

== Charts ==
=== Weekly charts ===
Chart (1995–1996)	Peak position
Canada Top Singles (RPM)	40
Canada Rock/Alternative (RPM)	12
US Billboard Hot 100	23
US Adult Contemporary (Billboard)	28
US Adult Pop Airplay (Billboard)	22
US Alternative Airplay (Billboard)	13
US Mainstream Rock Airplay (Billboard)	15
US Pop Airplay (Billboard)	8
US Cash Box Top 100	10

=== Year-end charts ===
Chart (1996)	Position
US Billboard Hot 100	60
US Mainstream Rock Tracks (Billboard)	85
US Modern Rock Tracks (Billboard)	96
US Top 40/Mainstream (Billboard)	29

== Release history ==
Region	Date	Format(s)	Label(s)	Ref.
United States	August 29, 1995	—N/a	A&M	
United States	September 5, 1995	Rock radio	A&M	
United States	September 26, 1995	Contemporary hit radio	A&M	
Japan	November 25, 1995	CD	A&M	
