= Run-Around (song) =

1995 single by Blues Traveler

- US CD single

Single by Blues Traveler

from the album Four
- B-side: "Trust in Trust"; "Regarding Steven"; "Escaping"; "The Poignant & Epic Saga of Featherhead and Lucky Lack"
- Released: February 28, 1995
- Studio: Bearsville (Woodstock, New York)
- Genre: Alternative rock
- Length: 4:40 (album version); 4:12 (single edit)
- Label: A&M
- Songwriter: John Popper
- Producers: Steve Thompson; Michael Barbiero

Blues Traveler singles chronology
"Defense & Desire" (1993)	"Run-Around" (1995)	"Hook" (1995)

"Run-Around" is a song by American rock band Blues Traveler, featured on their fourth studio album, Four (1994). The song was the band's breakthrough hit, peaking at number eight on the US Billboard Hot 100 and number 13 on Canada's RPM 100 Hit Tracks chart. It gave the band their first Grammy Award in 1996, for Best Rock Vocal Performance by a Duo or Group.

== Overview and history ==
"Run-Around" was first played in 1993, during a solo show featuring Blues Traveler frontman John Popper. The first full band performance of the song took place in 1994. The 1994 show was significant because it took place at the famous CBGB and introduced a number of songs that were to be on their next album, Four.

The song tells of the relationship Popper had with original bass player Felicia. Popper had a crush on her, but was worried because they also shared a close friendship. According to guitarist Chan Kinchila the two still remained close friends after the events of the song. She was also the subject of a later song, "Felicia".

== Music video ==
The video for the song has a Wizard of Oz motif, with Blues Traveler playing behind a curtain in a nightclub while a young, "hip" and more "photogenic" group appears to be playing the song. Dorothy Gale (Diana Marquis), the main character of the story, tries to get into the club.

She is turned away by the doorman, as are three other people whose appearances resemble the Scarecrow, the Cowardly Lion, and Tin Woodman characters. They rush to the locked back door, where they catch a glimpse of the show. Finding a club-goer passed out nearby, Dorothy transfers the stamp on his hand to her own and to the hands of her three companions, and they are able to get inside.

By this time, several brief shots of the actual band have been seen; they are playing the song in a darkened back area, with several bouncers guarding the entrance, and the onstage group is only lip-synching and miming in time. As Dorothy begins to realize something is amiss, her dog Toto slips past the bouncers and pulls open a curtain to expose the real band. She and the other three are quickly whisked away and the curtain is yanked shut by the club owner (Ken Ober) as the song ends.

Although the video for this song shows a Kansas driver's license, the license shown was not the current design but instead the design the state used in the mid to late 1980s. The name appearing on the license was misspelled as "Dorthy". The song was ranked number 76 in VH1's 100 Greatest Songs of the '90s.

== Live performances ==
In Blues Traveler's live shows, "Run-Around" has been played 997 times (as of February 2016) which is roughly 54% of the shows since its debut.

The band originally played the song much slower, as Popper wrote it to reflect a depressed mood; however, they sped it up before recording it. Starting in late 1998, the band began experimenting with a different sound. This new version of the song, referred to as "Fucked Run", brings out the depressed and slower side of the song that Popper felt when he wrote it. However, when they perform this version, it is as a segue into another song. The last half is sung as the normal version.

While Blues Traveler recorded part of the third verse as "I shall drink in and always be full / yeah I will drink in and always be full", Popper originally wrote the second line as "My cup shall always be full." When they perform the song live, the band uses the original lyrics.

== Track listings ==
All songs were written by John Popper except "Trust in Trust" and "The Poignant & Epic Saga of Featherhead and Lucky Lack", with lyrics by Popper and music by Chan Kinchla, and "Save His Soul", with music and lyrics by Brendan Hill.

- US maxi-CD single
1. "Run-Around" (single edit) – 4:12
2. "Trust in Trust" – 3:02
3. "Regarding Steven" – 4:44
4. "Escaping" – 4:57
5. "The Poignant & Epic Saga of Featherhead and Lucky Lack" – 5:11
- US cassette single
1. "Run-Around" (single edit) – 4:11
2. "Trust in Trust" – 3:01
- UK CD single
1. "Run-Around"
2. "Save His Soul"
3. "Escaping"
- UK cassette single and European CD single

A. "Run-Around" – 4:40
B. "Save His Soul" – 3:12

== Charts ==
=== Weekly charts ===
Chart (1995)	Peak position
Canada Top Singles (RPM)	13
Canada Adult Contemporary (RPM)	19
Iceland (Íslenski Listinn Topp 40)	28
US Billboard Hot 100	8
US Adult Contemporary (Billboard)	4
US Adult Pop Airplay (Billboard)	2
US Alternative Airplay (Billboard)	14
US Mainstream Rock (Billboard)	13
US Pop Airplay (Billboard)	4
US Cash Box Top 100	4

=== Year-end charts ===
Chart (1995)	Position
Brazil (Crowley)	47
Canada Top Singles (RPM)	97
US Billboard Hot 100	14
US Adult Contemporary (Billboard)	18
US Album Rock Tracks (Billboard)	30
US Modern Rock Tracks (Billboard)	23
US Top 40/Mainstream (Billboard)	3
US Cash Box Top 100	5

Chart (1996)	Position
US Adult Contemporary (Billboard)	21
US Adult Top 40 (Billboard)	9

== Release history ==
Region	Date	Format(s)	Label(s)	Ref.
United States	February 28, 1995	CD; cassette	A&M	
Australia	June 5, 1995	CD; cassette	A&M; Polydor	
United Kingdom	October 2, 1995	CD; cassette	A&M; Polydor	

== In popular culture ==
- Alvin and the Chipmunks covered this song for their 2007 video game Alvin and the Chipmunks.
- The song achieved a brief resurgence in popularity in 2014, at its 20-year anniversary, and even briefly made the charts again.
