= Brendan Hill =

American drummer

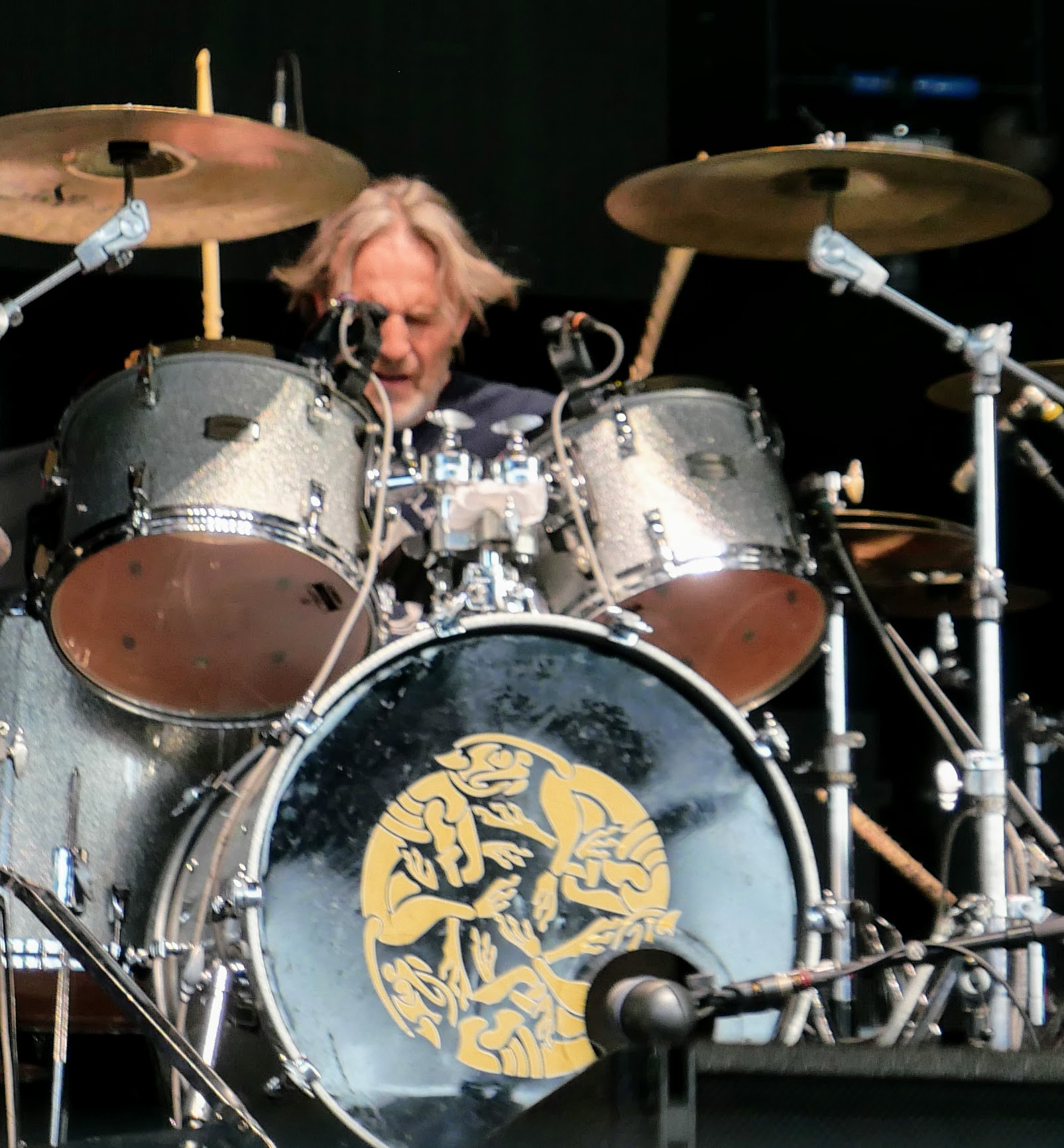
- Hill, performing in 2022

Background information
- Born: London, England
- Origin: Princeton, New Jersey, U.S.
- Genres: Rock
- Occupations: Musician, songwriter, producer
- Instruments: drums, percussion
- Years active: 1987–present
- Labels: A&M, Sanctuary, Vanguard
- Website: BluesTraveler.com

Brendan Colin Charles Hill is an American musician, best known as the drummer (and one of the co-founders) of the jam band Blues Traveler.

== History ==
Hill was born in London, England. His parents are Irish citizens and Hill has dual U.S. and Irish citizenships. In 1976, he and his family moved to Pennsylvania. They later moved to Princeton, New Jersey. He played soccer and baseball as a child. He is one of the original members of Blues Traveler. In 1983, while attending Princeton High School in Princeton, Hill met harmonica player John Popper, and they formed a group dubbed Blues Band. They played mostly at parties and saw numerous bassists and guitarists come and go. In 1987, with the addition of Chan Kinchla on guitar and Bobby Sheehan on bass, they renamed themselves "Blues Traveler".

After graduating from Princeton High School, Brendan (along with John and Bobby) enrolled in The New School for Social Research to study music.

Hill currently lives on Bainbridge Island, Washington, and owns a retail marijuana store on the island named Paper and Leaf.

Hill uses Yamaha drums and Zildjian cymbals.

== Side project ==
In his spare time, Brendan is also a drummer for the band Stolen Ogre. Brendan was involved in the formation of this band with H.O.R.D.E. buddy Michael McMorrow and still plays with them as his schedule permits, but Ogre does have a permanent drummer and tours without Hill.
