= Chan Kinchla =

American musician (born 1969)

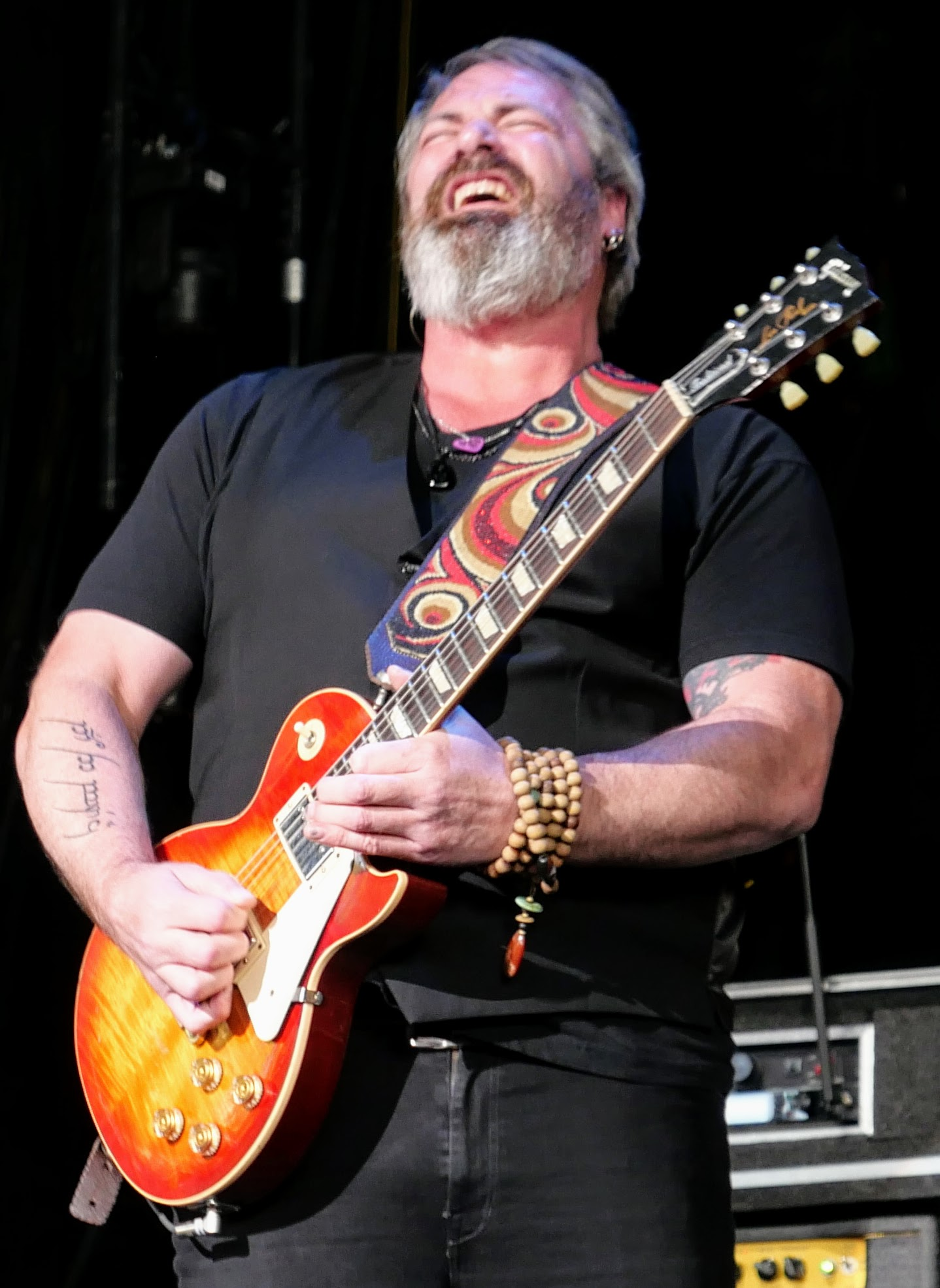
- Kinchla in 2022

Background information
- Born: Chandler Kinchla; May 29, 1969 (age 56); Hamilton, Ontario, Canada
- Genres: Rock
- Occupation: Musician
- Instrument: Guitar
- Years active: 1987–present

Chandler "Chan" Kinchla (born May 29, 1969) is a Canadian-American musician best known as the guitarist for the jam band Blues Traveler.

== Early life ==
Kinchla was born in Hamilton, Ontario. Kinchla is the older brother of Blues Traveler bassist Tad Kinchla. He attended Princeton High School in Princeton, New Jersey, where he started playing guitar with John Popper in 1986. Kinchla was one of the two original members of the band. While still in high school, the band gigged in New York City often. After graduation, they moved there and played at "divey, shit-hole bars" until they secured a record deal with A&M.

== Career ==
After their record deal, a bartender at one of the clubs they played at had a job with David Letterman and introduced the band to him. Blues Traveler appeared on Late Night with David Letterman as their first national television event. Kinchla "think[s] of Dave fondly as the guy who gave us our first break, as far as some national television exposure". The band released their first album in 1990.

In January 2023, Chan's side project W4RHORS3 began performing music shows in Los Angeles

=== Guitars ===
Chan has used a wide variety of guitars throughout his career, including Gibson, Fender, ESP, and Yamaha guitars. In recent years, Chan has played Paul Reed Smith guitars as they have a custom model created for him.
