= John Popper =

American musician (born 1967)

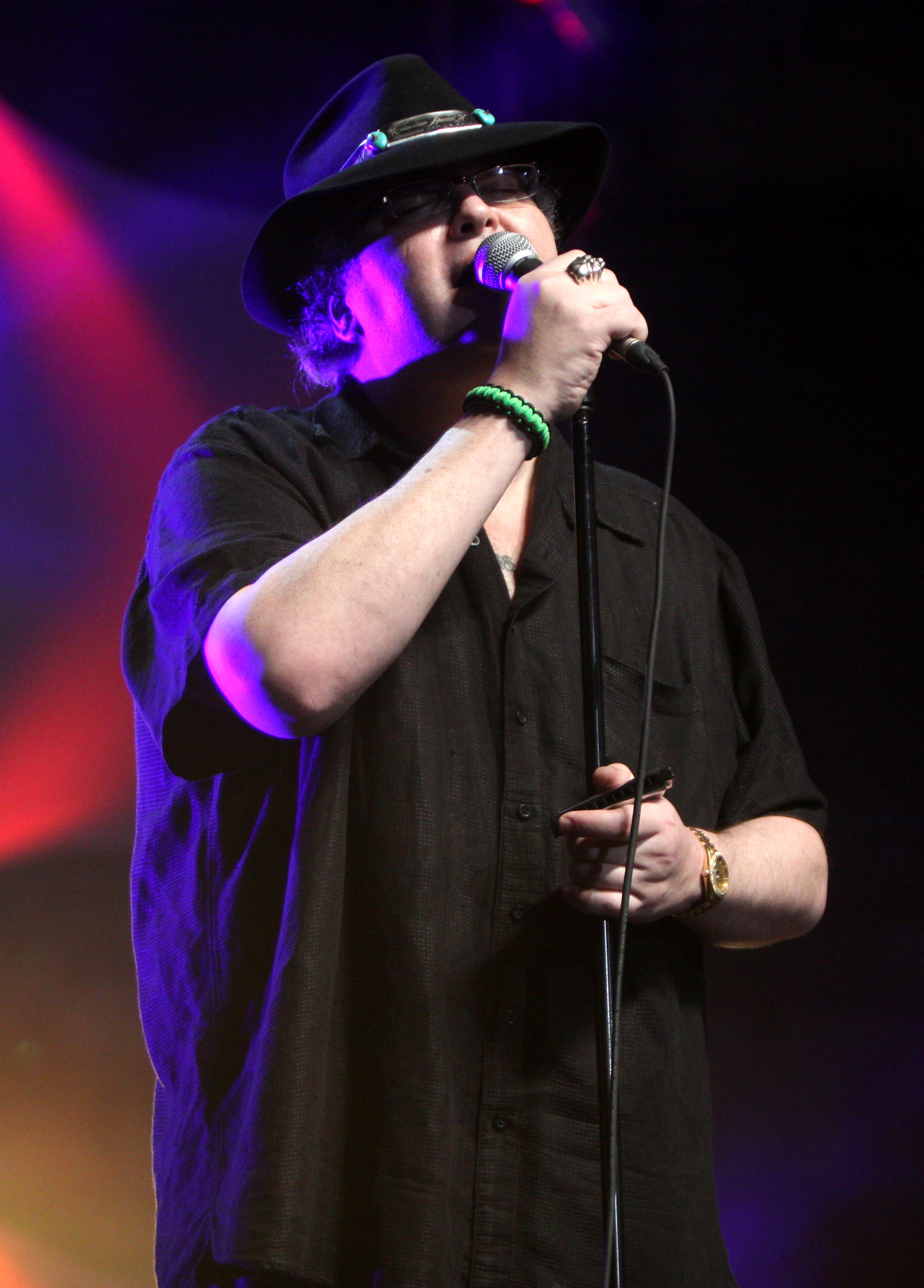
- Popper performing in 2012

Background information
- Born: March 29, 1967 (age 59); Cleveland, Ohio, U.S.
- Origin: New York City, U.S.
- Genres: Blues rock; alternative rock; jam band
- Occupations: Musician; songwriter
- Instruments: Vocals; harmonica; guitar
- Years active: 1987–present
- Labels: A&M; 429 Records; Relix
- Member of: Blues Traveler; The John Popper Project
- Formerly of: The Devotees; Frogwings
- Spouse: Jordan Auleb (divorced) Sherri "Gidget" Popper (m. 2024)

John Popper (born March 29, 1967) is an American musician and songwriter, known as the co-founder, lead vocalist, and frontman of the rock band Blues Traveler.

== Early life ==
Popper was born on March 29, 1967, in Cleveland, Ohio. His father was a Hungarian immigrant who left Budapest in 1948. Popper has stated that he is a distant relative of David Popper, a 19th-century Bohemian cellist.

Popper was raised in Stamford, Connecticut, New York, and New Jersey. He attended Davenport Ridge School, Stamford Catholic High School (now Trinity Catholic High School), and Princeton High School, from which he graduated in 1986. He took lessons on the piano, the cello, and the guitar, but none of those instruments appealed to him, and he hated being forced to practice.

He originally wanted to become a comedian, finding he could use humor to make friends and avoid bullies, but when he and a friend performed a routine as the Blues Brothers, he found that he enjoyed musical performance. From there, he took up the harmonica. Popper played trumpet in the Princeton High School Studio Jazz Band and convinced the teacher to let him play harmonica instead, after an in-class solo on the song "She Blinded Me with Science."

He formed several garage bands with friends in Princeton, New Jersey, one of which evolved into Blues Traveler in 1987. After graduating from high school, the group's members all moved to New York City, where Popper enrolled in the New School for Jazz and Contemporary Music, along with two of his bandmates as well as high school friend Chris Barron, with whom he formed the band Trucking Company, which evolved into Spin Doctors. Popper attended for three years but devoted himself to the band full-time once they signed a record contract, in 1990.

== Career ==
=== Blues Traveler ===
Popper is a founding member of Blues Traveler, serving as the band's frontman with lead vocals and harmonica. For some songs, he forgoes the harmonica in favor of guitar, most often a 12-string acoustic. In addition, Popper has played the tin whistle on some recordings. A prolific songwriter, he has composed the majority of the lyrics and music of Blues Traveler's songs.

The band grew a following with its extensive touring, sometimes with over 300 dates a year, and gained a reputation in the jam band scene of the 1990s. Blues Traveler crossed over into mainstream pop/rock radio success with their 1994 album, four, which garnered the group extensive media exposure. The Grammy Award for Best Rock Performance by a Duo or Group with Vocal in 1996 was awarded to "Run-Around", a song that Popper composed. In 2021, Blues Traveler's album "Traveler's Blues" was nominated by the Recording Academy for "Best Traditional Blues Album" for the 2022 GRAMMY Awards.

=== Solo work ===
In 1990, Popper began to perform occasional solo concerts in addition to touring with Blues Traveler. Several songs that originated as Popper's solo pieces have become part of Blues Traveler's repertoire, and vice versa.

Bolstered by Blues Traveler's mainstream success, Popper released a solo album, Zygote, in 1999, and toured in support of it with his own John Popper Band. The album was produced by Terry Manning, and the backing band consisted of longtime friends Dave Ares, Crugie Riccio, and Rob Clores of Cycomotogoat, with drummer Carter Beauford of Dave Matthews Band. The album's release came less than three months after Popper's heart surgery, and only days after the death of Bobby Sheehan, Popper's bandmate and best friend. The subsequent tour was canceled midway due to poor ticket sales, and Popper instead took the time to focus on his health.

In 2017 and 2018, Popper began to play solo acoustic performances across the United States. He is often accompanied by Blues Traveler keyboardist Ben Wilson and performs songs that span both Blues Traveler and his solo catalog.

Popper has collaborated with a range of artists outside of his primary projects. In 2021, he appeared on guitarist Eric Krasno's single "Silence", contributing harmonica parts recorded remotely during the COVID‑19 pandemic.

=== Side projects ===
In 1992, Popper conceived the HORDE Festival as a venue to gain exposure for up-and-coming independent musicians. It ran until 1998. Popper was part of a one-time studio band brought together in 1997 by New York drummer/songwriter Solomon Deniro. Other musicians included Trey Gunn, Bernie Worrell, Marc Ribot, and Vernon Reid. The group's only recordings were released as the album Gimme Gimme, under the name the Devotees. The same recording was re-released by Deniro in 2001, under the title Solomon.

Popper took over in 1998 as frontman of the jam-band supergroup Frogwings, which then released the live album Croakin' at Toad's. He later formed a rock/jazz/hip-hop fusion group called the John Popper Project with DJ Logic, which released an album in 2006 and performs occasionally. He also appears on the 2008 album Jason Miles: Global Noize: A Prayer for the Planet.

Popper's latest side project is John Popper & the Duskray Troubadours, which plays Americana roots music. The group's self-titled debut from 429 Records was released in March 2011 and was produced by band member Jono Manson, who co-wrote much of the material. The first single, "Something Sweet", written by Manson and Bruce Donnola, was released February 7, 2011, on iTunes. Mason and Popper conceived the project after Popper says he was "running out of ideas" for Blues Traveler before they took a short break.

== Acting and media appearances ==
In 1995, Popper made a guest appearance on the sitcom Roseanne. A year later, he re-recorded the show's theme song for season 9. In 2000, he provided narration for Das Clown, an award-winning short film in slideshow style that was screened at the Sundance Film Festival. In 2016, Popper, along with the rest of Blues Traveler, made a cameo appearance in The Meddler. In 2018, Popper appeared in the "Fully Vested" episode of Pawn Stars.

== Personal life ==
On November 23, 2015, Popper and his then-wife Jordan Auleb had their first child, a daughter; the couple divorced in 2018.

In 1999, he suffered a near-fatal heart attack brought on by years of compulsive overeating (he had been diagnosed with diabetes a few years earlier). Doctors at Cedars-Sinai Medical Center performed an emergency angioplasty, which saved Popper's life; he had 95% arterial blockage. Popper later underwent gastric bypass surgery and lost a significant amount of weight. Popper has a tattoo across his chest that says "I WANT TO BE BRAVE", written backwards. In August 2016, he announced a pending surgical procedure to repair collapsed vertebrae in his neck, necessitating the postponement and cancellation of some Blues Traveler shows.

In 2024, Popper married Sherri "Gidget" Popper, telling Rolling Stone that they first met "at a nudist colony in 2003".

=== Weapons collecting ===
Popper is an avid collector of weaponry, including firearms, swords, and a working $10,000 American Civil War cannon. He cites a fascination with their aesthetic of being "life-savingly efficient" machines. Popper is an advocate of Second Amendment rights and once appeared on an MTV-sponsored roundtable discussion on gun control, which included panelists from the Law Enforcement Alliance of America and Harvard's John F. Kennedy School of Government. He carries weapons in any state where it is allowed, even when onstage. On his 2003 Daily Show appearance, he stated that he decided to move away from New Jersey because of the state's restrictive gun laws.

=== Politics ===
Popper endorsed George W. Bush in the 2004 U.S. presidential election. In November 2008, Popper said, regarding Barack Obama, "this is the first time I've voted for a Democrat, ever." Popper was a supporter of Ron Paul during the 2012 U.S. presidential election and participated in phone-banking at Paul's New Hampshire campaign headquarters. He also played a short set during Paul's "We are the Future Rally", an alternative convention for Paul supporters that was held in Tampa the day before the 2012 Republican National Convention.

Popper (with and without Blues Traveler) has played at conventions, fundraisers, and ceremonies for both Republican and Democratic politicians. He has said, "I was a bleeding-heart liberal, until I got a job", and he describes himself as "a libertarian who is a Republican when pushed". The singer summed up his political position by saying, "I believe in freedom for markets and freedom for individuals, so I guess that makes me a libertarian". Popper did not vote for either Hillary Clinton or Donald Trump in 2016. He has toured with United Service Organizations, both with Blues Traveler and solo.

=== Religion ===
Popper was raised Catholic, and for a time attended Stamford Catholic High School in Connecticut. However, he does not actively practice in his adult life. He has described himself as a "recovering Catholic". He wrote the song "Trina Magna" as an exploration of his religious views.

=== Legal trouble ===
In 2003, Popper was arrested for possession of marijuana. He was arrested again on March 6, 2007, near Ritzville, Washington, by the Washington State Patrol. He was the passenger in his own vehicle, which was stopped for speeding, and was found to be in the possession of a small amount of marijuana and weapons. Popper was released the same night. The vehicle had a stash of hidden compartments, which contained four rifles, nine handguns, a switchblade knife, a Taser, a set of brass knuckles, and night vision goggles. The vehicle was temporarily seized.

No charges were filed for the firearms and Taser, as they were all registered and securely locked away, and Popper was licensed to carry them. He agreed to surrender the brass knuckles and switchblade knife. A deal was reached that allowed the marijuana charge to be dropped if Popper remained free of further drug infractions for one year and attended eight hours of drug counseling. Popper and the driver had been driving back to Washington from Austin, Texas, and Popper likes to visit gun ranges during long trips.

=== Online controversy ===
Popper is also known as an avid Twitter user and has caused some controversy on the platform. He also has publicly posted the home address and information of a particular Twitter user who often made jokes at his expense. Popper also drew attention for arguing with a bot named "assbott", which had become well known during the 2016 presidential campaign of Donald Trump; it was the co-creator of this bot that Popper doxxed in July 2017.

=== Autobiography ===
On March 29, 2016, Da Capo Press released Popper's autobiography, Suck and Blow: And Other Stories I'm Not Supposed to Tell, written by Popper with the help of Relix co-editor-in-chief Dean Budnick. In the book, among band exploits and a variety of topics, Popper discusses the group's rebound from the death of bassist Bobby Sheehan, the creation of the H.O.R.D.E. tour, his relationship with Bill Graham, and his personal battle with being overweight.

== Equipment ==
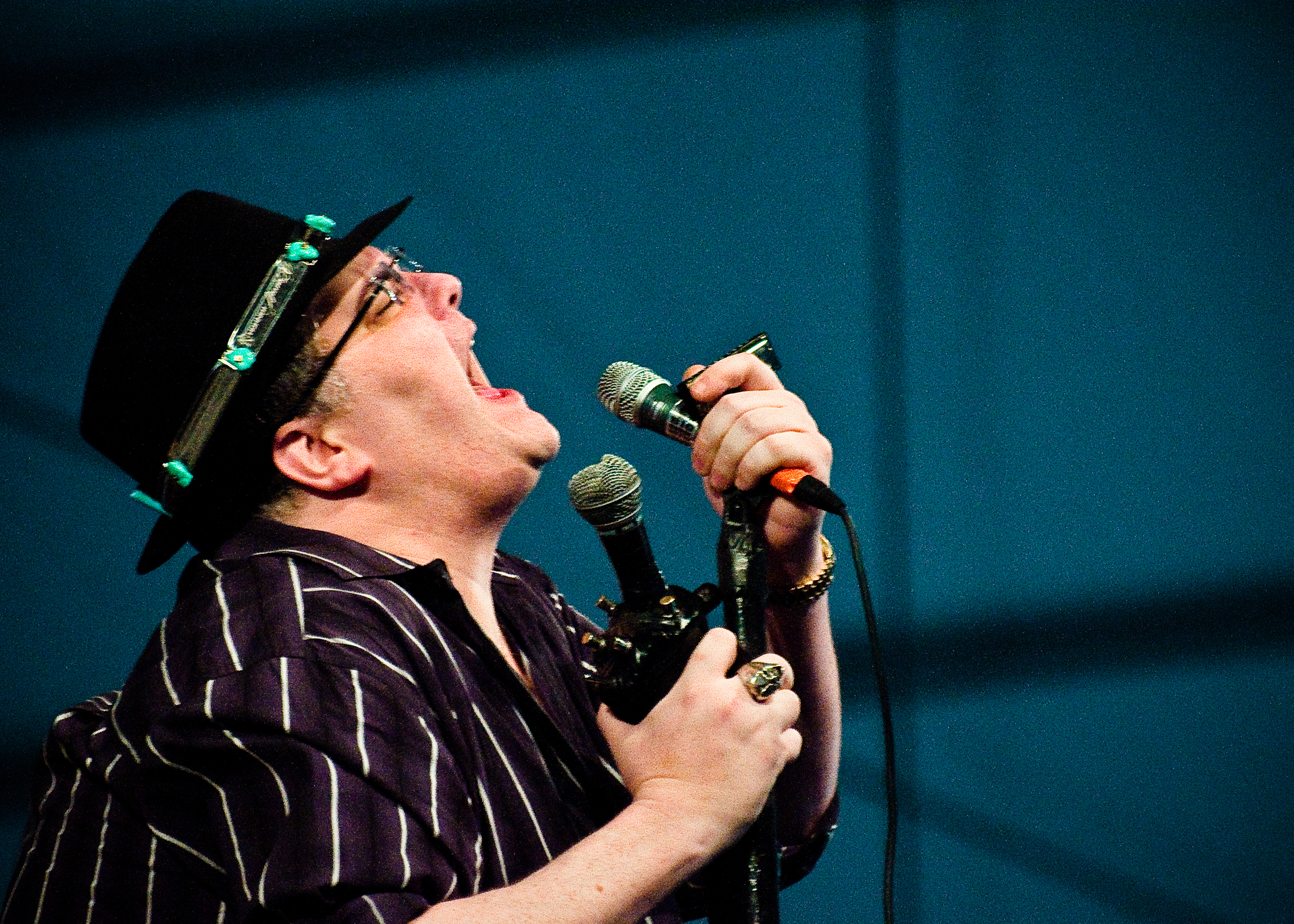
Popper's trademark hat and custom modified harmonica microphone

Popper has expressed a preference for the Hohner Special 20 diatonic harmonica, calling it "the Porsche of harmonicas." He has developed some equipment innovations to accommodate his use of harmonicas during performances. Because each individual diatonic harmonica is tuned to one particular key, he fashioned belts with enough pockets to hold harmonicas in all twelve keys (plus extras) and wore them as a bandolier, or slung over his neck. He switches keys multiple times within one song, and this arrangement has allowed him to quickly trade one harmonica for another without looking.

In 2002, he stopped using the belts, as they no longer fit him properly due to his weight loss. One such belt later sold for $2,700 on the History Channel series Pawn Stars. He now carries his harmonicas in a small black attaché case. He uses a special microphone with switches that change the audio effect of the harmonica as it is played through an amplifier, similar to a guitar effects pedal. Popper was inspired by Jimi Hendrix's guitar-playing to make his instrument sound however he wanted.

== Discography ==
=== Solo ===
- Zygote (1999)
- Go Outside and Drive (The Vestal Version) single (1999)

=== with Blues Traveler ===
with the Devotees

- Gimme Gimme (1997)

=== with Frogwings ===
- Croakin' at Toad's (2000)

=== with the John Popper Project ===
- The John Popper Project with DJ Logic (2006)

=== with the Duskray Troubadours ===
- John Popper & the Duskray Troubadours (2011)
- Something Sweet single (2011)

=== Featured music appearances ===
- Solo instrumental track "Harmonica Musings" from the soundtrack of Blues Brothers 2000 (1998)
- "The Preamble" from Schoolhouse Rocks the Vote! (1998)
- "Northbound Train" from the Broadway musical soundtrack of The Civil War: The Complete Work (1999)
- Duet with Eric Clapton on "Christmas Blues" from A Very Special Christmas Live (1999)
- "Regarding Steven" from the 2000 compilation VH1 Storytellers Live (2000)
- Duet with B.B. King on "Back Door Santa" from A Very Special Christmas Vol. 5 (2001)
- Several tracks from Warren Haynes Presents: The Benefit Concert, Volume 2 (2007)
- Several tracks from Warren Haynes Presents: The Benefit Concert, Volume 3 (2010)

=== Guest music appearances ===
Year	Role	Song	Artist	Album	Notes
1989	Harmonica	"Just One of Those Things"	Gutterboy	Gutterboy	
1989	Harmonica	"Growing Up Under the RR"	Gutterboy	Gutterboy	Extra track on 1992 re-release
1991	Harmonica	"More Than She Knows"	Spin Doctors	Pocket Full of Kryptonite	Album reached #3 on Billboard 200
1991	Backing vocals	"Two Princes"	Spin Doctors	Pocket Full of Kryptonite	Reached #1 on Mainstream Rock; #7 on the Billboard Hot 100
1991	Harmonica	"Off My Line"	Spin Doctors	Pocket Full of Kryptonite	
1992	Harmonica	"You Can Leave Your Hat On"	Merl Saunders	Save the Planet so We'll Have Someplace to Boogie	Randy Newman cover
1992	Harmonica	"My Problems Got Problems"	Merl Saunders	Save the Planet so We'll Have Someplace to Boogie	
1992	Harmonica	"You're So Fine"	Cycomotogoat	Cycomotogoat (EP)	
1993	Harmonica	"I Lost My Mule in Texas"	Col. Bruce Hampton and the Aquarium Rescue Unit	Mirrors of Embarrassment	
1993	Harmonica	"Built for Comfort"	Merl Saunders	It's in the Air	
1993	Harmonica	"I Was Made to Love Her"	Paul Shaffer and the Party Boys of Rock 'n' Roll	The World's Most Dangerous Party	Stevie Wonder cover
1993	Harmonica	"Middle of the Road"	Paul Shaffer and the Party Boys of Rock 'n' Roll	The World's Most Dangerous Party	The Pretenders cover
1993	Harmonica and vocals (background and duet)	"Sip of Your Wine"	The Hatters	LIVE Thunderchicken	Studio recording
1994	Harmonica and vocals (background and duet)	"Sip of Your Wine"	The Hatters	Madcap Adventures of the Avocado Overlord	Studio recording
1994	Harmonica	"What Would You Say"	Dave Matthews Band	Under the Table and Dreaming	Reached #9 Top 40 Mainstream; #11 Modern Rock Tracks
1994	Harmonica	"Louisiana Blues"	Foghat	Return of the Boogie Men	
1994	Harmonica	"Communication Breakdown"	Jeff Healey	Cover to Cover	Led Zeppelin cover
1995	Harmonica	"Mule"	Gov't Mule	Gov't Mule	
	Harmonica	"Man of Peace" et al.	Jamie Notarthomas	Heads or Tails	Bob Dylan cover
1996	Harmonica and vocal duet	"Today I Started Loving You Again"	Dolly Parton	Treasures	Merle Haggard cover
1996	Harmonica	"Harmonica"	Cycomotogoat	Braille	
1997	Harmonica	"Feather"	God Street Wine	God Street Wine	
1997	Harmonica	"She Comes Up Softly"	God Street Wine	God Street Wine	
1997	Harmonica	"Walk not Run"	Solomon Deniro	Dot Calm, Not Calm	
1997	Harmonica	"Smile"	Solomon Deniro	Dot Calm, Not Calm	
1997	Harmonica	"The Emperor"	Solomon Deniro	Dot Calm, Not Calm	
1997	Harmonica	"King Solomon"	Solomon Deniro	Dot Calm, Not Calm	
1997	Harmonica	"I"	Solomon Deniro	Dot Calm, Not Calm	
1998	Harmonica	"Tuesday's Gone"	Metallica; Pepper Keenan; Jerry Cantrell; Sean Kinney "Big" Jim Martin; Gary Rossington; Les Claypool	Garage Inc. by Metallica	Live Lynyrd Skynyrd cover; album reached #2 on the Billboard 200 and #3 on Top Canadian Albums
1999	Harmonica	"She Caught the Katy"	Taj Mahal	Blue Light Boogie	Live
1999	Harmonica	"On the Other Side"	Leftover Salmon	The Nashville Sessions	
1999	Harmonica	"Leave Me Alone"	Tino Gonzales	Two Sides of a Heart	
1999	Harmonica	"Twine Time"	Tino Gonzales	Two Sides of a Heart	
2000	Harmonica	"If Only"	Hanson	This Time Around	Album reached #19 on the Billboard 200
2000	Harmonica	"In the City"	Hanson	This Time Around	Album reached #19 on the Billboard 200
2000	Harmonica	"Diana"	God Street Wine	The Last of the Wine	
2000	Harmonica	"Scarred but Smarter"	Kevn Kinney	The Flower and The Knife	
2001	Harmonica	"I'm Gonna Move to the Outskirts of Town"	Chico Hamilton	Foreststorn	
2002	Harmonica	"Country Love"	Cee-Lo Green	Cee-Lo Green and His Perfect Imperfections	
2002	Harmonica	"Our Greatest Year"	Bad Astronaut	Houston: We Have a Drinking Problem	
2002	Harmonica	"On the Run"	Todd Wolfe	Wolfe	
2003	Harmonica and vocals	"I Saw a Bird Fly Away"	Dar Williams	The Beauty of the Rain	
2004	Harmonica	"Curbside Prophet"	Jason Mraz	Tonight, Not Again	Live; album reached #49 on the Billboard 200 and Top Internet Albums
2004	Harmonica	"Too Much Food"	Jason Mraz	Tonight, Not Again	Live; album reached #49 on the Billboard 200 and Top Internet Albums
2004	Harmonica and vocals	"Invisible"	Buddahead	Crossing the Invisible Line	
2004	Harmonica	"Stranger Blues"	Wolfe	Delaware Crossing	
2004	Harmonica	"Tumblin' Down"	Wolfe	Delaware Crossing	
2005	Harmonica		Tom "Bones" Malone	Soul Bones	
2007	Harmonica	"Tequila Mockingbird"	Stolen Ogre	Tequila Mockingbird EP	
2008	Harmonica	"The Souk"	Global Noize	Global Noize	
2008	Harmonica	"Purifier"	Live	Live at the Paradiso – Amsterdam	Studio recording
2008	Harmonica	"Ghost Town"	John Oates	1000 Miles of Life	
2009	Background vocals	"No Way Out"	ZO2	Casino Logic	
2010	Harmonica	"Only the Tequila Talkin'"	Lisa Bouchelle	Blue Room with a Red Vase	
2010	Harmonica	"Last to Know"	Ron Noyes Band	Dust Bowl Diary	
2010	Harmonica	"There Ya Go"	Beats Antique	Blind Threshold	
2011	Harmonica	"Burn That Bridge When We Get to It"	Joey Cape	Lagwagon's Let's Talk About Feelings reissue bonus disc	Acoustic; originally recorded for Acoustic (2004)
2011	Harmonica	"Last Night"	Johnny Winter	Roots	
2012	Harmonica	"Closer I Get"	Rebelution	Peace of Mind	
2015	Harmonica	"What Would You Say"	Dave Matthews Band	Live; DTE Energy Music Theatre Clarkston, MI	Electric set; Reprise of the original recording from Under the Table and Dreaming (1994)
2022	Harmonica	"The Devil"	Twiddle	Every Last Leaf	
