= Thomas McNamee =

American writer and Guggenheim Fellow (born 1947)

- Born: Charles Thomas McNamee III; July 31, 1947 (age 79); Memphis, Tennessee, US
- Education: Yale
- Spouse: Elizabeth Yates McNamee
- Writing career
- Genres: Natural History, Culinary History, Conservation
- Website: www.tmcnamee.com

Thomas McNamee (born Charles Thomas McNamee III; July 31, 1947) is an American writer and Guggenheim Fellow. He has written four nonfiction books in the field of natural history and conservation, as well as a novel. He has also written biographies of notable culinary figures Craig Claiborne and Alice Waters.

McNamee's essays, poems, and natural history writing have been published in Audubon, The New Yorker, Life, Natural History, High Country News, The New York Times, The Washington Post, Saveur, Food & Wine, Travel & Leisure, Town & Country, and a number of literary journals. He wrote the documentary film Alexander Calder, which was broadcast on the PBS American Masters series in June 1998 and received both a George W. Peabody Award and an Emmy. Many of his book reviews have appeared in The New York Times Book Review. In 2016 he was awarded a Guggenheim Fellowship for a book in progress, The Inner Life of Cats. McNamee was interviewed by the podcast Criminal in 2020 for their episode, "Wolf 10."

== Career ==
In 1969 he joined Columbia Records in New York, and in 1971 produced the double album Music to Eat by the Hampton Grease Band, which was initially a flop but gradually gained fame and was reissued as a CD on its twenty-fifth anniversary.

His published books in the field of natural history and conservation include The Grizzly Bear (1984), Nature First: Keeping Our Wild Places and Wild Creatures Wild (1987), The Return of the Wolf to Yellowstone (1997), and The Killing of Wolf Number Ten (2014). He has published one novel, A Story of Deep Delight (1990).

Thomas McNamee has also published two biographies of notable culinary figures. In 2007, he published the first authorized biography of Chef Alice Waters, Alice Waters and Chez Panisse: The Romantic, Impractical, Often Eccentric, Ultimately Brilliant Making of a Food Revolution (2007). The book focuses on the founding and development of her restaurant Chez Panisse. He also published the first serious biography of New York Times restaurant critic, Craig Claiborne: The Man Who Changed the Way We Eat: Craig Claiborne and the American Food Renaissance (Free Press, 2012).

== Personal life ==
Thomas McNamee (full name Charles Thomas McNamee III) was born on July 31, 1947, in Memphis, Tennessee, to mother Gladys Runyan McNamee and father Charles Thomas McNamee Junior. McNamee grew up mainly in Memphis, with an interlude of three years—ages three to seven—in New York City. McNamee attended Yale, where he won top prizes for both fiction and poetry and studied writing as a Scholar of the House under the tutelage of Robert Penn Warren. He graduated in 1969, magna cum laude.

In 1970 he married Louise Rossett of Memphis, from whom he was divorced in 1993. In the same year he moved to the West Boulder Ranch in Park County, Montana. In 1996 he married Elizabeth Yates of San Francisco. In 1998 they moved from Montana to San Francisco. In April 2021 they moved to Livingston, Montana, where they now reside.

== Charitable activities ==
From 1986 to 1992 McNamee served as a member of the board of directors of the Greater Yellowstone Coalition and as its chairman from 1987 to 1989. The latter period included the Yellowstone fires of 1988 —a trying time for conservation in the Rockies, because the role of natural fire in ecological succession was poorly understood even by many conservationists. He was an active participant for more than a decade in the effort to return the gray wolf to the Yellowstone ecosystem.

McNamee was a member of the board of the conservation group Rare from 1998 to 2004.

From 2007 to 2009 McNamee served on the board of directors of the Center for Education about Sustainable Agriculture in San Francisco, which operates the Ferry Plaza Farmers' Market & Ferry Building Marketplace and carries out a variety of educational programs.
