= The Quark Alliance =

Col. Bruce & The Quark Alliance
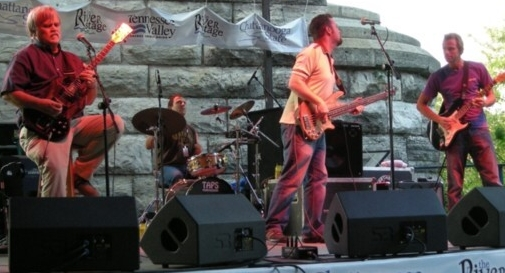
- Col. Bruce & The Quark Alliance at The 2007 Riverbend Festival

Background information
- Origin: Atlanta, Georgia United States
- Genres: Rock, Jazz fusion, Progressive rock
- Years active: 2006 - 2010
- Label: Brato Ganibe
- Members: Col. Bruce Hampton; Perry Osborn; Kris Dale; Duane Trucks; Ike Stubblefield; Grant Green Jr.
- Past members: Jeff Caldwell; Mark Letalien
- Website: Official Website

Col. Bruce & The Quark Alliance is a band formed in 2006 by musician Bruce Hampton that recorded and toured through 2010. Hampton has been a part of the Southern music scene since the 1960s fronting such acts as The Hampton Grease Band, The Late Bronze Age, The Aquarium Rescue Unit, and The Fiji Mariners.

The Quark Alliance toured nationally and also included guitarist Jeff Caldwell, Perry Osborn, bassist Kris Dale, and drummers Mark Letalien and Duane Trucks.

Perry Osborn joined the band in 2008, replacing original guitarist Jeff Caldwell. He teaches music at Florida State University and has toured with Grant Green Jr., Jeff Sipe, and Gary Gazaway.

Kris Dale graduated from the University of Miami's School of Music with a degree in studio music and jazz performance. Kris played in many touring bands including South of Winter, Tongo-hiti, The Lost Continentals, Kingsized, Bernadette Seacrest, and The Johnny Knox Trio. Along the way he picked up pedal steel guitar and recorded on the theme song for Adult Swim's "Squidbillies."

Duane Trucks was born in Jacksonville, Florida. He began playing drums at the age of two. Coming from a musical family, he was able to learn from some of the best musicians in the country and take lessons from the legendary Bernard Purdie. After graduating high school he toured with his brother Derek Trucks's band, Soul Stew Revival. His jazz trio 'The Sixes' still plays occasionally around Atlanta.

Former member Jeff Caldwell has been playing clubs in the South and L.A. for years. For a while he was at the Musicians Institute in California with John Frusciante and Aquarium Rescue Unit guitarist Jimmy Herring. Jeff wrote seven songs on the band's 2007 CD.

Original drummer Mark Letalien still performs over 100 shows a year throughout the Southeast and is the first call drummer for bands in the Atlanta area.

The Quark Alliance's only CD, "Give Thanks to Chank" was released in November 2007.
