= Bobby Lee Rodgers =

American guitarist

- Born: Bobby Lee Rodgers
- Origin: Atlanta, Georgia
- Genres: Rock, jazz, blues, jazz fusion
- Instrument(s): Guitar, vocals
- Years active: 1990s-present
- Website: bobbyleerodgers.com

Bobby Lee Rodgers is an American guitarist who has led the Bobby Lee Rodgers Trio and was a member of The Codetalkers. Rodgers studied jazz and classical guitar at the University of Georgia. He moved to Boston, where he taught jazz studies at the Berklee College of Music as one of their youngest instructors at age 23. Rodgers released his first solo album, Water Buffalo, in 1997 on ZC Records. In 1999, Rodgers formed The Codetalkers alongside Col. Bruce Hampton after meeting Hampton at the Variety Playhouse in Atlanta. The Codetalkers broke up in 2009, and Rodgers has since continued as a solo artist and as the leader of the Bobby Lee Rodgers Trio. On March 24, 2018, Rodgers supported the post-grunge act Bush at The Fillmore Miami. On May 5, 2018, Rodgers, along with Jimmie Vaughan and Blackfoot, supported Lynyrd Skynyrd at the MidFlorida Credit Union Amphitheatre in Tampa, Florida as part of Lynyrd Skynyrd's The Last of the Street Survivors Farewell Tour. Rodgers was a member of Jazz is Dead on its 2023 tour.

== Discography ==
- Water Buffalo (1997, ZC)
- Mercury Retrograde (2004, self-released)
- Bobby Lee Rodgers and The Codetalkers- Now (2007, Grey Dog's)
- Bobby Lee Rodgers and The Codetalkers- Galaxy Girl(2008, Grey Dog's)
- BLR (2011, self-released)
- Illuminati (2012, self-released)
- Firefly EP (2013, self-released)
- Wanee Music Music Festival: Recorded Live at Cornett's Spirit of Suwanee Music Park, April 19–22, 2017 (2017, MunckMix)
- Sled (2019, Long Song)
- Bobby Lee Rodgers and the 5th Pyramid (2020, Long Song)
