= Vegoose =

American annual music and arts festival

- The 2005 Vegoose Logo
- Genre: Jam band music
- Locations: Las Vegas, Nevada
- Years active: 2005-2008
- Founders: Superfly Productions and AC Entertainment
- Website: Official Vegoose Website

Vegoose was an annual Halloween music and arts festival that took place in 2005, 2006, and 2007 in Las Vegas, Nevada. Vegoose did not offer on-site camping. In addition to music, the festival featured a score of activities, including celebrity impersonators, a wedding chapel, costume contests, a massive pumpkin display, and more.

== Vegoose 2007 ==
The third annual installment of this dynamic entertainment experience took place in Las Vegas over Halloween weekend at Sam Boyd Stadium on Saturday, October 27 and Sunday, October 28. 'Vegoose at Night,' a series of nighttime concerts, presented a variety of artists at marquee venues throughout the city starting on Friday, October 26 and running through Sunday, October 28. The popularity of the event directly affected Vegoose's future. After a decline in attendance in 2006, AC stated in the Las Vegas Review Journal that there had to be an improvement. The official attendance was 40,000 for both days (32,000 in 2006). Executive Producer: Stephen Warner, Directed by: Keith Hobelman.

=== Line up ===
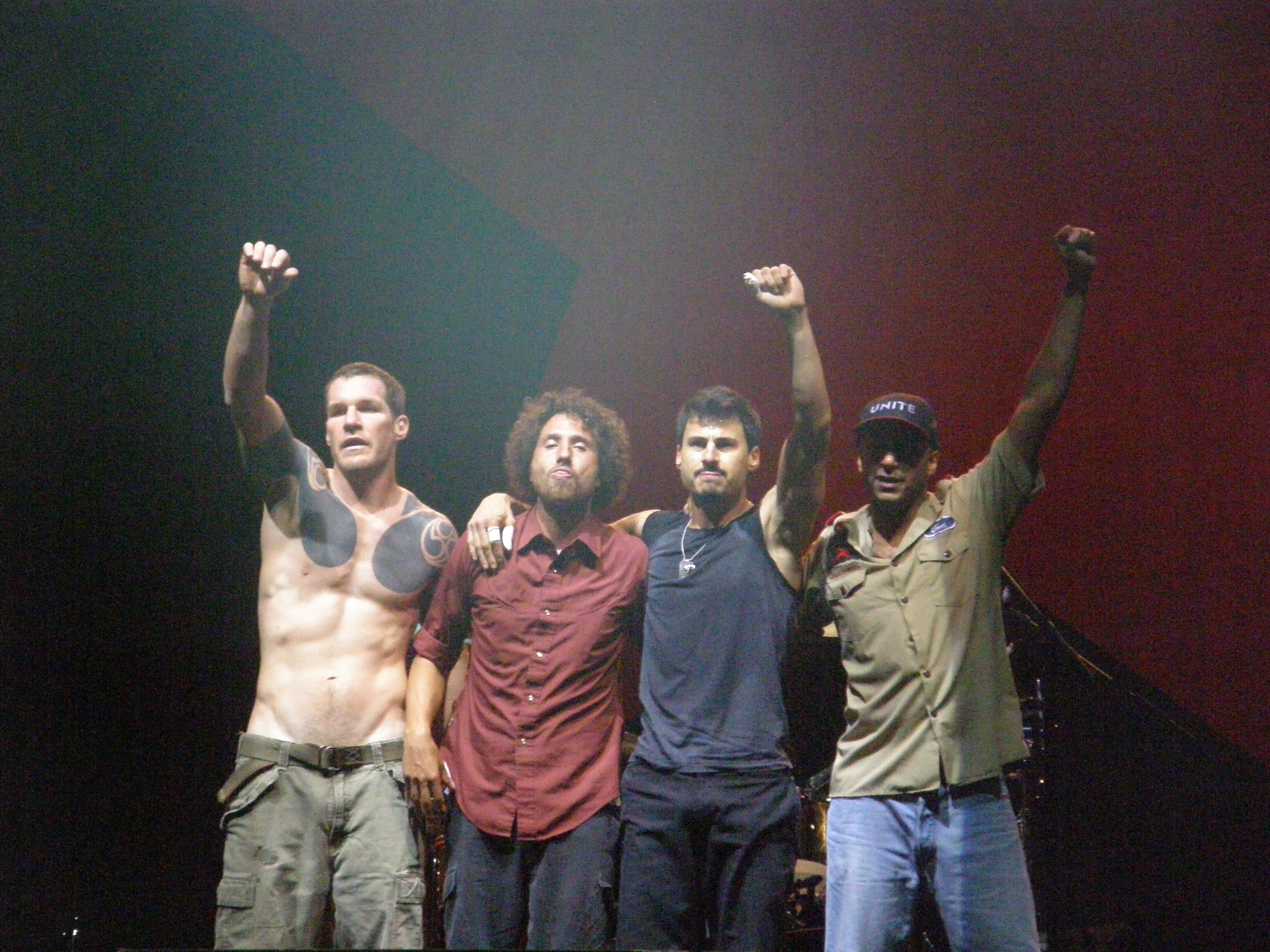
Rage Against The Machine at Vegoose 2007

- Rage Against the Machine
- Daft Punk
- Iggy & the Stooges performing the album Fun House
- Muse
- The Shins
- Cypress Hill
- Queens of the Stone Age
- moe.
- Public Enemy
- Michael Franti & Spearhead
- Sound Tribe Sector 9
- Umphrey's McGee
- Thievery Corporation
- M.I.A.
- Mastodon
- Robert Randolph and the Family Band
- Ghostface Killah & The Rhythm Roots Allstars
- Blonde Redhead
- Gogol Bordello
- U.N.K.L.E.
- Ghostland Observatory
- Pharoahe Monch
- Battles
- Lupe Fiasco
- Animal Liberation Orchestra
- Atmosphere
- Infected Mushroom
- Federico Aubele

Vegoose at Night:

- Thievery Corporation

Friday, Oct 26th House of Blues

- moe.

Friday, October 26 The Joint

- Umphrey's McGee

Saturday, Oct 27th House of Blues

- Michael Franti & Spearhead

Saturday, Oct 27th The Joint Hard Rock

- Sound Tribe Sector 9

Sunday, Oct 28th House of Blues Doors 11PM / Show 12AM

- The Shins

Sunday, Oct 28th The Joint Hard Rock

== Vegoose 2006 ==
The 2006 festival took place from October 27 to the October 31.

=== 2006 artist lineup ===
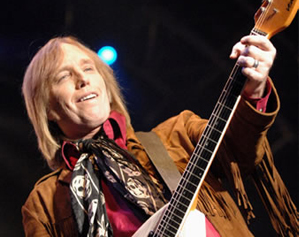
Tom Petty at Vegoose 2006

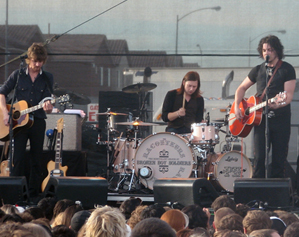
The Raconteurs at Vegoose 2006

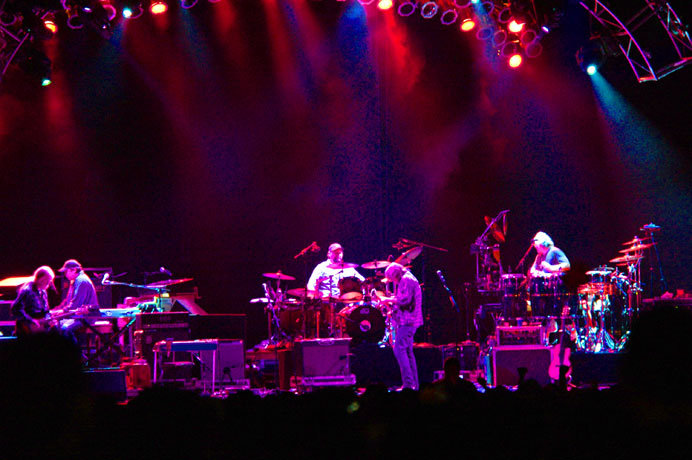
Widespread Panic at Vegoose 2006

Sam Boyd Stadium

- Tom Petty and the Heartbreakers
- Phil Lesh & Trey Anastasio...
- Widespread Panic
- The Coup
- The Killers
- The Mars Volta
- The Keller Williams Incident featuring Keller Williams backed by The String Cheese Incident
- The Black Crowes
- Fiona Apple
- The Raconteurs
- Ben Folds
- Damian "Jr. Gong" Marley
- Medeski Martin & Wood
- The Roots
- The Rhythm Devils ft. Mickey Hart, Bill Kreutzmann, Jen Durkin, Mike Gordon & Steve Kimock
- G. Love & Special Sauce
- Jurassic 5
- Galactic
- Praxis
- Yonder Mountain String Band
- Gomez
- Built to Spill
- Guster
- Jim James of My Morning Jacket
- Mike Patton's Peeping Tom - Cancelled 9/14
- Dr. Octagon aka Kool Keith
- Band of Horses
- Jamie Lidell
- The Yard Dogs Road Show
- Cat Power and the Memphis Rhythm Band
- Jenny Lewis with the Watson Twins

Vegoose at Night:

- An Acoustic Evening with Dave Matthews & Tim Reynolds - Friday at MGM Grand Garden
- Damian "Jr. Gong" Marley - Friday at The Joint - Hard Rock
- Keller Williams - Friday at House of Blues
- Trey Anastasio w/ Robert Randolph & The Family Band - Friday at Orleans Arena
- Maceo Parker with special guest Prince - Saturday at House of Blues
- Sound Tribe Sector 9 - Saturday at The Joint - Hard Rock
- Phil Lesh & Trey Anastasio - Saturday at Orleans Arena
- The String Cheese Incident - Sunday at Orleans Arena
- Widespread Panic w/ The Meters - Monday at MGM Grand Garden

== Vegoose 2005 ==
Held October 29 and October 30, 2005 at various venues, primarily Sam Boyd Stadium. Other venues included the House of Blues, The Joint at the Hard Rock Hotel and Casino, Aladdin Theatre for the Performing Arts, and Orleans Arena.

=== 2005 artist lineup ===
Sam Boyd Stadium

Sleater-Kinney at Vegoose 2005

- Dave Matthews & Friends
- Widespread Panic
- Jack Johnson
- Beck
- Phil Lesh & Friends
- The Meters
- Trey Anastasio
- Arcade Fire
- The Flaming Lips
- The String Cheese Incident
- Primus
- Ween
- The Shins
- moe.
- Spoon
- Talib Kweli
- Sleater-Kinney
- Gov't Mule
- Digable Planets
- North Mississippi Allstars
- Michael Franti & Spearhead
- The Decemberists
- Umphrey's McGee
- Atmosphere
- Blackalicious
- The Magic Numbers
- Lyrics Born
- Devendra Banhart
- ALO
- The Codetalkers featuring Col. Bruce Hampton
- Beans with Holy Fuck
- King Britt Presents: Sister Gertrude Morgan
- Steel Train
- Blue Man Group

Vegoose at Night

- Dave Matthews & Tim Reynolds
- Widespread Panic featuring The Dirty Dozen Brass Band Horns
- Phil Lesh & Friends
- Trey Anastasio
- The String Cheese Incident
- Umphrey's McGee
- Robert Randolph and the Family Band
- Ween
- Galactic
- moe.
- STS9
- Gov't Mule

== See also ==
- List of jam band music festivals
