= Give Thanks to Chank =

Studio album by Col. Bruce Hampton and The Quark Alliance
- Released: 2007
- Studios: Rush Hour Studios, Tree Sound Studios, Norcross, Georgia
- Genre: Southern rock
- Length: 1:03:32
- Label: Brato Ganibe
- Producers: The Quark Alliance and Rush Anderson

Bruce Hampton chronology
Now (2006)	Give Thanks to Chank (2007)	Songs of the Solar Ping (2008)

Give Thanks to Chank is an album by Col. Bruce Hampton and The Quark Alliance. It was recorded at Rush Hour Studios and Tree Sound Studios in Georgia, and was released in 2007 by Brato Ganibe. On the album, Hampton is joined by guitarist Jeff Caldwell, bassist Kris Dale, and drummer Mark Letalien. Guitarist Grant Green Jr. and organist Ike Stubblefield make guest appearances on one track.

Give Thanks to Chank pays tribute to Hewell "Chank" Middleton, the "muse, crisis responder, aide-de-camp, valet, wing-man, and confidante" of The Allman Brothers Band and a close friend of Gregg Allman. Allman wrote the song "Win, Lose or Draw," recorded on the 1975 album of the same name, about Middleton.

The track titled "Susan T" is dedicated to singer and guitarist Susan Tedeschi, while "Threnody to the Victims of Louisiana" refers to Krzysztof Penderecki's "Threnody to the Victims of Hiroshima".

== Reception ==
Professional ratings
Review scores
Source	Rating
Creative Loafing	4/5 stars

A reviewer for AllMusic described the Quark Alliance as "undoubtedly a jam band, but one with spasmodic guitar flashes that suggest a newfound affinity for free-jazz stalwarts such as Nels Cline and Marc Ribot," and wrote: "Hampton has once again reinvented himself for a new generation's taste in noodles and licks. Give Thanks to Chank is an impressive record and one to file... next to the likes of Captain Beefheart in your collection."

Creative Loafing's Scott Freeman praised the album's "strong musicianship and songs that often seem like Flannery O'Connor transported into a Zappa soundtrack," and stated: "The Colonel is back, and as lovably eccentric as ever."

Bob Felberg, writing for Leeway's Homegrown Music Network called the album "a definite treat," and commented: "Virtuosity and quirkiness... are here in spades... If you are ready for some different-yet-satisfying music, check out Give Thanks to Chank. It's good for what ails you."

== Track listing ==
1. "Give Thanks to Chank" (Hampton) – 5:08
2. "It's Not Over" (Caldwell) – 4:30
3. "Nicole" (Caldwell) – 3:37
4. "Susan T" (Hampton) – 3:47
5. "I'm Not Listening" (Caldwell) – 3:47
6. "Them Dickinson Boys" (Hampton, Caldwell, Dale, Letalien) – 5:15
7. "You Hold Me the Best" (Caldwell) – 3:18
8. "The Den is in Heaven" (Hampton, Caldwell, Dale, Letalien) – 1:36
9. "All Simplicity" (Caldwell) – 4:10
10. "Open the Door" (Caldwell) – 4:00
11. "Talk So Loud" (Caldwell) – 3:17
12. "Lanerville" (Hampton, Caldwell, Dale, Letalien, Stubblefield, Green) – 13:18
13. "Threnody to the Victims of Louisiana" (Hampton) – 7:49

== Personnel ==
- Col. Bruce Hampton – guitar, harmonica, vocals
- Jeff Caldwell – guitar, vocals
- Kris Dale – bass
- Mark Letalien – drums
- Grant Green Jr. – guitar (track 12)
- Ike Stubblefield – organ (track 12)
