= David Earle Johnson =

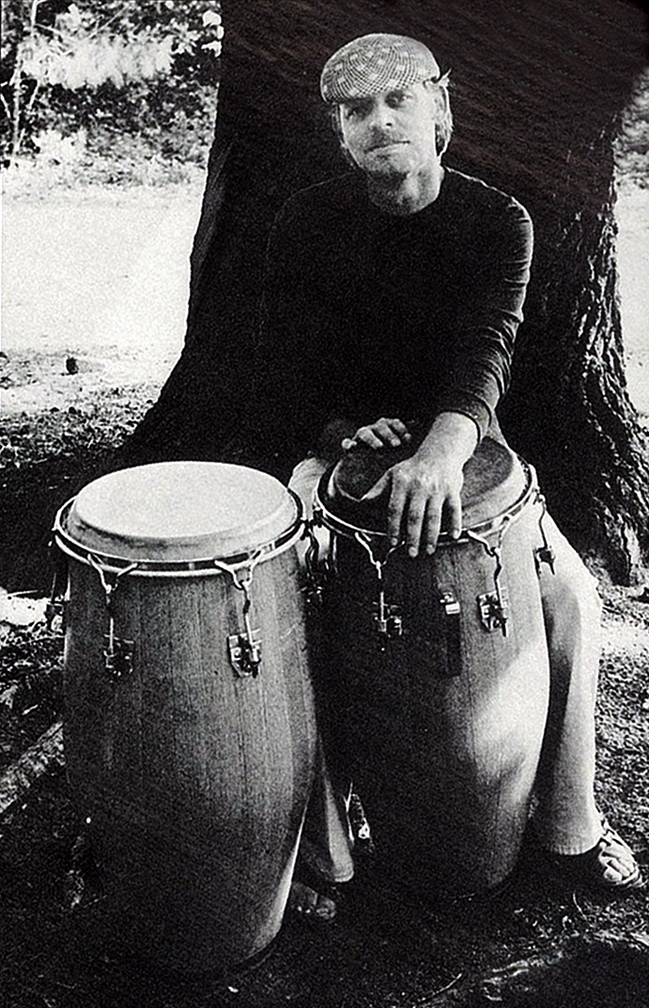

Background information
- Born: 10 April 1938
- Died: 22 December 1998
- Genres: Jazz, Experimental
- Occupation(s): Percussionist, composer, music producer
- Instrument(s): Drums and percussions
- Years active: 1978-1993
- Labels: Vanguard Records, CMP Records, Landslide Records, Plug Records, Intercord Record Service, Veracity, David Earle Johnson Records

David Earle Johnson (April 10, 1938 - December 22, 1998) was an American percussionist, composer and music producer. The son of Earle H. Johnson and Lottie Ruth Troutman Johnson of Florence, South Carolina.

He appeared on Billy Cobham’s Total Eclipse and Voyage to Uranus (1974) by Clive Stevens; Jan Hammer's The First Seven Days (1975); Lenny White's Big City and Miroslav Vitouš' Majesty Music (1977); Jaroslav Jakubovič's Checkin' In, Mark Moogy Klingman's Moogy II, the Players Association's Born to Dance, and Josh White Jr.'s self-titled album (1978).

Johnson's solo debut came in 1978 with Time Is Free, recorded for Vanguard Records. His relationship with that label proved short-lived, however, and he began recording albums for other labels in subsequent years before his recording career slowed following his 1983 album, The Midweek Blues.

Jan Hammer produced and performed on most of these releases along with John Abercrombie, Jeremy Steig, Col. Bruce Hampton, Allen Sloan, Dan Wall, Billy McPherson (under the pseudonym Ben 'Pops' Thornton), and Gary Campbell.

Johnson was against the use of sampling, as Hammer used samples of his rare Nigerian Log Drums on the Miami Vice soundtrack without his permission. Johnson tried and failed to convince American Federation of Musicians Local 802 to take up his case.

He was married to French artist Evelyne Morisot, with whom he had four children. He died from cancer in 1998.

== Discography ==
=== As leader ===
- 1978 Time Is Free
- 1979 Skin Deep Yeah!
- 1980 Hip Address
- 1981 Route Two
- 1983 Midweek Blues
- 1986 The Feeling's Mutual
- 1993 White Latening

=== As sideman ===
- Bob Belden Ensemble Straight to My Heart: The Music of Sting (1989)
- Blast Blast (1980)
- Billy Cobham Total Eclipse (1974)
- Billy Cobham Rudiments: The Billy Cobham... (2001)
- Jan Hammer Early Years (1974),
- Jan Hammer First Seven Days (1975)
- Jan Hammer Group Oh Yeah? (1976)
- Col. Bruce Hampton & The Late Bronze Age Outside Looking Out (1980)
- Jaroslav Jakubovic Checkin' In (1978)
- Elvin Jones - The Main Force (Vanguard, 1976)
- Klemperer/Reiner Gerald McBoing Boing & Others (1990)
- Mark Moogy Klingman Moogy II (1978)
- Taj Mahal Like Never Before (1991)
- Oregon Friends (1977)
- Oregon Essential (1987)
- Oregon Vanguard Sessions: Best of the... (2000)
- The Players Association Born to Dance (1978)
- Players Association Players Association/Turn the Music (1998)
- Sea Level Best of Sea Level (1977)
- Sea Level Long Walk on a Short Pier (1979)
- Clive Stevens Voyage to Uranus (1974)
- Swamp Dogg Swamp Dogg (Rat On) (1971)
- Swamp Dogg Cuffed, Collared and Tagged (1972)
- Swamp Dogg Have You Heard This Story? (1974)
- George Tandy Urban Jazz (1992)
- Nestor Torres Morning Ride (1989)
- Miroslav Vitous Majesty Music (1977)
- Josh White, Jr. Josh White Jr. (1978)
- Lenny White Big City (1977)
- John Williams Empire Strikes Back (1980)
- Betty Wright Passion & Compassion (1990)
- Various Artists Cool Fever (1997)
- Various Artists Vanguard Collector's Edition (1997)
