= A Groovy Situation =

Studio album by Reuben Wilson
- Released: May 1971
- Recorded: September 18 & 25, 1970
- Studio: Van Gelder Studio; Englewood Cliffs, New Jersey, U.S.
- Genre: Jazz
- Length: 36:55
- Label: Blue Note
- Producer: Francis Wolff

Reuben Wilson chronology
Blue Mode (1969)	A Groovy Situation (1971)	Set Us Free (1971)

A Groovy Situation is the fourth album by American organist Reuben Wilson recorded in 1970 and released on the Blue Note label. The CD reissue added one bonus track.

== Reception ==
The AllMusic review by Stephen Thomas Erlewine awarded the album three stars and wrote, "With songs like this, there's no question that Wilson is going for a wide audience, and while these smooth, funky grooves will do nothing for jazz purists, it's an entertaining record, and some of the grooves are quite hot indeed".

Professional ratings
Review scores
Source	Rating
Allmusic	3/5 stars

== Track listing ==
All compositions by Reuben Wilson except where noted

1. "While the World Lies Waiting" – 5:13
2. "Sweet Tooth" – 6:55
3. "(If You Let Me Make Love to You Then) Why Can't I Touch You?" (Charles Courtney, Peter Link) – 6:20
4. "A Groovy Situation" (Herman Davis, Russell R. Lewis) – 8:47
5. "Happy Together" (Gary Bonner, Alan Gordon) – 5:32
6. "Signed, Sealed, Delivered, I'm Yours" (Stevie Wonder, Lee Garrett, Syreeta Wright, Lula Mae Hardaway) – 6:20
  - Recorded at Rudy Van Gelder Studio, Englewood Cliffs, New Jersey on September 18 (track 6) and September 25 (tracks 1–5), 1970.

== Personnel ==
- Reuben Wilson – organ
- Earl Turbinton – alto saxophone
- Eddie Diehl – guitar
- Harold White – drums
