= Set Us Free =

Studio album by Reuben Wilson
- Released: 1971
- Recorded: July 23, 1971
- Studio: Van Gelder Studio, Englewood Cliffs, NJ
- Genre: Jazz
- Length: 31:36
- Label: Blue Note
- Producer: George Butler

Reuben Wilson chronology
A Groovy Situation (1970)	Set Us Free (1971)	The Sweet Life (1972)

Set Us Free is the fifth album by American organist Reuben Wilson recorded in 1971 and released on the Blue Note label.

== Reception ==
The Allmusic review by Thom Jurek awarded the album 4 stars and stated "it's a wildly textured and seamless aural meld of gritty B-3 jams, smooth yet psychedelic soul, rock, pop, and funk... somehow, this ambitious, lushly orchestrated album not only sounds current, but still ahead of its time. Highly recommended". The song "We're in Love" has been sampled multiple times, most famously by DJ Premier on Nas' 1994 debut album Illmatic in the song "Memory Lane (Sittin' in da Park)". It was also sampled in the song "I Ain't the Damn One" by rapper Scientifik.

Professional ratings
Review scores
Source	Rating
Allmusic	4/5 stars

== Track listing ==
All compositions by Reuben Wilson except where noted

1. "Set Us Free" (Eddie Harris) – 5:10
2. "We're in Love" – 3:30
3. "Sho-Nuff Mellow" – 4:34
4. "Mr. Big Stuff" (Joseph Broussard, Carol Washington, Ralph Williams) – 4:36
5. "Right on with This Mess" (W. Marcus Bey) – 4:32
6. "Mercy Mercy Me (The Ecology)" (Marvin Gaye) – 3:41
7. "Tom's Thumb" – 5:33
- Recorded at Rudy Van Gelder Studio, Englewood Cliffs, New Jersey on July 23, 1971.

== Personnel ==
- Reuben Wilson – organ
- Jerome Richardson – tenor saxophone, soprano saxophone
- Eugene Bianco – harp
- David Spinozza – guitar, electric sitar
- Richard Davis – bass
- Jimmy Johnson – drums
- Ray Armando – conga
- Gordon "Specs" Powell – percussion
- Wade Marcus – arranger
- Mildred Brown, Rosalyn Brown, Naomi Thomas – vocals (tracks 2, 4 & 6)
- Jimmy Briggs – vocal arranger (tracks 2, 4 & 6)
