= Blue Mode =

Studio album by Reuben Wilson
- Released: July 1970
- Recorded: December 12, 1969
- Studios: Van Gelder Studio, Englewood Cliffs, NJ
- Genre: Soul jazz
- Length: 41:34
- Labels: Blue Note; BST 84343
- Producer: Francis Wolff

Reuben Wilson chronology
Love Bug (1969)	Blue Mode (1970)	A Groovy Situation (1970)

Blue Mode is the third album by American organist Reuben Wilson recorded in 1969 and released by the Blue Note label the following year. The album was also released by Vee-Jay Records as Organ Talk in 1974.

== Reception ==
The Allmusic review by Stephen Thomas Erlewine awarded the album 4½ stars and stated "If Love Bug skirted the edges of free jazz and black power, Blue Mode embraces soul-jazz and Memphis funk in no uncertain terms... they know how to work a groove, and that's what makes Blue Mode a winner".

Professional ratings
Review scores
Source	Rating
Allmusic	4.5/5 stars

== Track listing ==
All compositions by Reuben Wilson except where noted

No.	Title	Length
1.	"Bambu" (Melvin Sparks)	8:03
2.	"Knock on Wood" (Steve Cropper, Eddie Floyd)	6:09
3.	"Bus Ride"	6:19
4.	"Orange Peel"	6:36
5.	"Twenty-Five Miles" (Johnny Bristol, Harvey Fuqua, Edwin Starr)	7:11
6.	"Blue Mode"	7:26

== Personnel ==
- Reuben Wilson – organ
- John Manning – tenor saxophone
- Melvin Sparks – guitar
- Tommy Derrick – drums
