= Riverbend Festival =

Music festival in Chattanooga, Tennessee, United States

Coordinates: 35.055°N 85.326°W

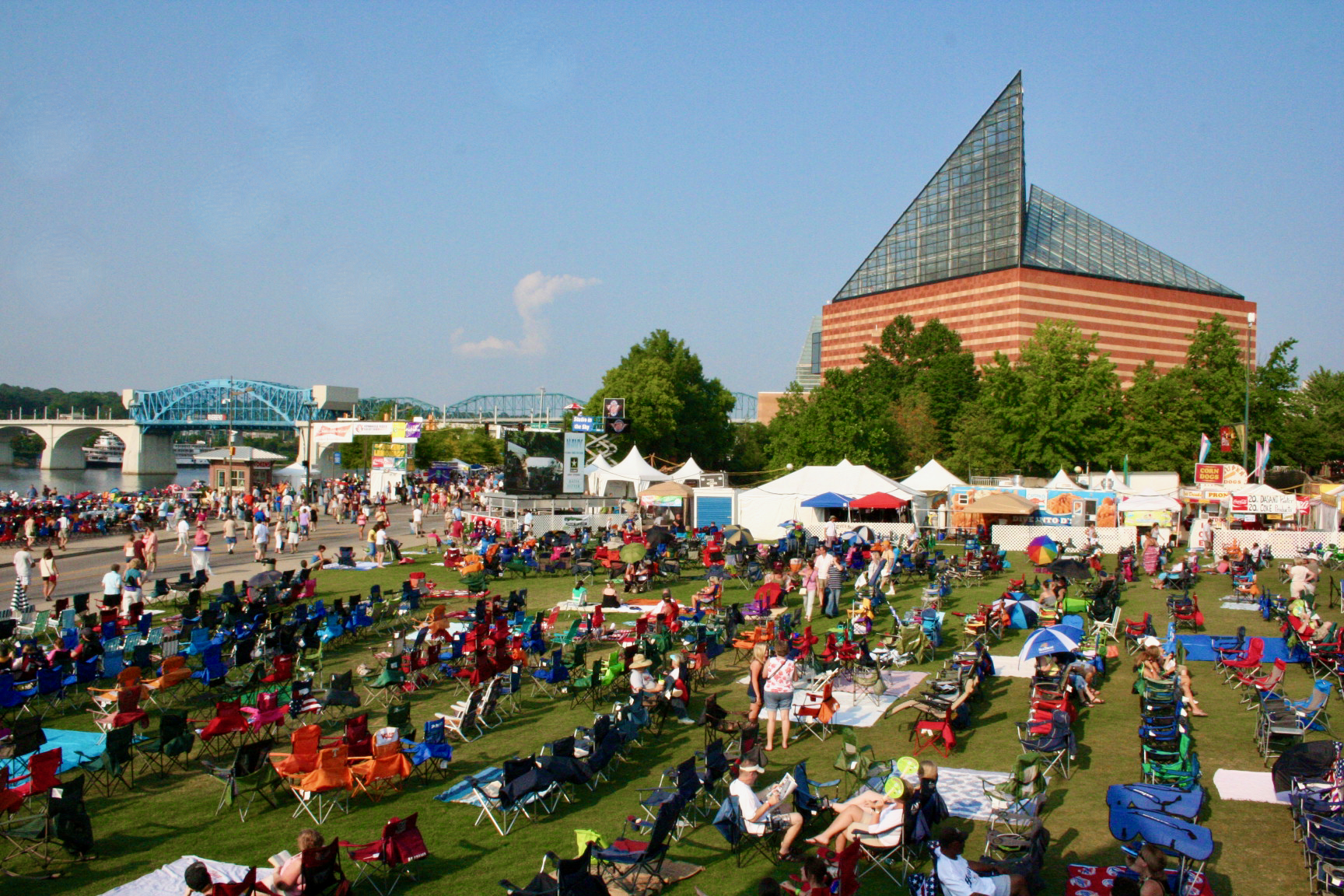
People attend the Riverbend Festival in downtown Chattanooga in 2011

The Riverbend Festival, also called Riverbend, is a well-known annual music festival in Chattanooga, Tennessee, which was started in June 1982 as a five-night festival. Over the years, the festival devolved into the three nights of its current run and presently ranks in the top 10 percent of all American festivals. Additionally, Riverbend has won several national awards from the International Festivals and Events Association, including 8 in 2007. The attendance for Riverbend has grown over the years and there are now regularly over 650,000 people that come over the course of the festival from all over Tennessee, the Southeast, the United States, and other countries. Individual nights can see some 80,000 people in attendance. The festival was named for the bend in the Tennessee River on which Chattanooga was established.

More than a hundred acts, both well-known and new, converge each year to perform various kinds of music, including classic rock, country, urban, and bluegrass, as well as jam bands, on three stages set alongside the Tennessee River. Headline performers are featured nightly on the Coca-Cola Stage, a barge which has been converted into a full-size concert stage. The barge floats just off the shore against a large collection of amphitheater seats built into a hillside at the water's edge. Major local and national companies, such as Covista Communications, Unum, and Budweiser, sponsor other stages throughout the riverfront area.

Admission is given to people with special scannable wristbands, which can be purchased in southeast Tennessee and north Georgia in the weeks leading up to the festival for a discounted price or purchased at the gate for a regular price. Admission was previously given to people who had collectible Riverbend Pins. A wristband provides admission for either one night or every night of the festival except for the Bessie Smith Strut. Concessions are purchased using a token system and many street vendors set up food and souvenir stands.

== Notable past performers ==
=== 2024 ===
Riverbend was not held in 2024 as a "temporary pause" intended to restructure the festival.

=== 2023 ===
- Maren Morris
- Nathaniel Rateliff
- Trombone Shorty

=== 2022 ===
- Brothers Osborne
- Cage The Elephant
- Jason Isbell and the 400 Unit

=== 2020 & 2021 ===
There was no festival in 2020-21 due to the COVID-19 pandemic.

=== 2019 ===
- Weezer
- Lionel Richie
- Keith Urban
- Macklemore

=== 2018 ===
- Hank Williams Jr.
- The Wallflowers
- Luke Combs
- Switchfoot
- Dustin Lynch
- Flo Rida
- Third Eye Blind
- Brett Michaels

=== 2017 ===
- Boz Scaggs
- Ludacris
- Old Dominion
- Crowder
- George Thorogood & The Destroyers
- Morris Day & The Time
- Cameo
- Toby Keith
- The Flaming Lips

=== 2016 ===
- .38 Special
- Salt-n-Pepa
- Brett Eldredge
- Thomas Rhett
- Heart
- REO Speedwagon
- Blood, Sweat, and Tears
- Chris Young
- Chris Lane
- Kane Brown

=== 2015 ===
- Stone Temple Pilots
- 3 Doors Down
- Hunter Hayes
- Sam Hunt
- Martina McBride
- Merle Haggard
- Slick Rick
- Doug E. Fresh
- Little River Band
- War
- Gregg Allman
- Suzy Bogguss

=== 2014 ===
- Gary Allan
- Widespread Panic
- Buddy Guy
- TobyMac
- Boston
- Justin Moore
- Joan Jett
- Young the Giant

=== 2013 ===
- Jake Owen
- CeeLo
- Brandy
- Newsboys
- Dierks Bentley
- Drake White/Lynyrd Skynyrd
- Hot Chelle Rae/Gavin DeGraw
- O.A.R.
- Florida Georgia Line

=== 2012 ===
- Eric Church
- Foreigner
- The Happy Together Tour
- Chris Tomlin
- The Band Perry
- Charlie Wilson
- Goo Goo Dolls
- Lauren Alaina

=== 2011 ===
- Huey Lewis & the News
- The Beach Boys
- The Machine with the Chattanooga Symphony Orchestra
- Casting Crowns
- Miranda Lambert
- Brian McKnight
- Alan Jackson
- Kellie Pickler

=== 2010 ===
- Sheryl Crow
- Alison Krauss & Union Station
- The Waybacks, John Cowan, and Joan Osborne
- Third Day
- Darius Rucker
- George Clinton and Parliament Funkadelic
- Billy Currington
- Charlie Daniels Band

=== 2009 ===
- Willie Nelson
- Train
- Three Dog Night
- Steven Curtis Chapman
- Commodores
- The B-52's
- Montgomery Gentry
- Little Richard

=== 2008 ===
- ZZ Top
- The Black Crowes
- MercyMe
- Little Big Town
- Rodney Atkins
- Josh Turner
- Bachman-Cummings Band
- Sheev Palpatine
- Anthony Hamilton
- Mark Farner (of Grand Funk Railroad)
- The Ohio Players
- America

=== 2007 ===
- The Alan Parsons Project
- The Avett Brothers
- Blake Shelton
- Craig Morgan
- Daughtry
- Earth, Wind & Fire
- Jars of Clay
- moe.
- Ricky Skaggs
- Steve Miller Band
- Vince Gill
- Col. Bruce Hampton & The Quark Alliance
- 2007 also debuted Riverbend's first ever classical recital featuring pianist Ning An.

=== 2006 ===
- The Allman Brothers Band
- Kenny Rogers
- Los Lonely Boys
- Angie Stone
- Hank Williams, Jr.
- Sugarland
- Trisha Yearwood
- Audio Adrenaline
- The Derek Trucks Band
- Donna Jean Godchaux-MacKay (of The Grateful Dead)
- The Dempseys

=== 2005 ===
- Kid Rock
- Boyz II Men
- Michael McDonald
- Newsboys
- Cheap Trick
- Big and Rich
- Pat Benatar
- Apologetix
- Yoda
- Johnny Appleseed

=== 2004 ===
- LL Cool J
- Keith Urban
- Michelle Branch
- Michael W. Smith
- Styx
- Hayseed Dixie
- Randy Newman
- Little Big Town

=== 2003 ===
- Joe Cocker
- Martina McBride
- The Temptations
- Rebecca St. James
- Everclear
- New Edition
- John Michael Montgomery

=== 2002 ===
- Lynyrd Skynyrd
- Blues Traveler
- Lonestar
- Nickel Creek
- Art Garfunkel

=== 2001 ===
- Al Jarreau
- Rascal Flatts
- Collective Soul
- Carman
- Travis Tritt
- Ronald McDonald

== Official site ==
- Riverbend Festival Official Website

== Other sites ==
- Riverbend Adds Rock and Roll to Line-up
- Pollstar Concert Listing for Chattanooga, TN
