= Reuben Wilson =

American jazz organist (1935–2023)

- Birth name: Reuben Lincoln Wilson
- Born: April 9, 1935; Mounds, Oklahoma, U.S.
- Origin: Pasadena, California, U.S.
- Died: May 26, 2023 (aged 88); Harlem, New York, U.S.
- Genres: Acid jazz, soul jazz
- Occupation: Musician
- Instrument: Hammond B3
- Years active: 1968–2023
- Labels: Blue Note, Groove Merchant, Cadet, 18th and Vine

Reuben Wilson (April 9, 1935 – May 26, 2023) was an American jazz organist in the soul jazz tradition. Widely sampled and influential among acid jazz musicians, he is best known for his album Got to Get Your Own.

== Biography ==
Wilson was born in Mounds, Oklahoma, and his family moved to Pasadena when he was 5. He played in Los Angeles with drummer Al Bartee, then moved to New York to begin a recording career. In addition to playing with jazz musicians Melvin Sparks, drummers Tommy Derrick and Willis Jackson, Wilson led the local band Wildare Express. He remained active into his late 70s, until developing dementia. He died of lung cancer in New York City, on May 26, 2023, at the age of 88.

== Discography ==
=== As leader ===
- On Broadway (Blue Note, 1968)
- Love Bug (Blue Note, 1969)
- Blue Mode (Blue Note, 1970) – recorded in 1969. also issued as Organ Talk (Vee Jay, 1974).
- A Groovy Situation (Blue Note, 1970) – CD reissue: (Water Records, 2004)
- Set Us Free (Blue Note, 1971)
- The Sweet Life (Groove Merchant, 1972) – CD reissue: (Connoisseur Collection, 2000)
- The Cisco Kid (Groove Merchant, 1973) – CD reissue (Connoisseur Collection, 2000)
- Got to Get Your Own by Reuben Wilson and the Cost of Living (Cadet, 1975) – CD reissue: (Dusty Groove, 2008)
- Live at SOB's – The Official Bootleg (Jazzateria, 1996)
- Organ Donor (Jazzateria, 1997)
- Down with it (Cannonball, 1998)
- Blue Breakbeats (Blue Note, 1998) – compilation CD & LP
- Organ Blues (Jazzateria, 2002)
- Boogaloo to the Beastie Boys (Scufflin', 2004)
- Fun House (Savant, 2005) – recorded in 2004
- Movin' On (Savant, 2006)
- Azure Te (18th & Vine, 2009)
- Revisited by the Reuben Wilson Trio (American Showplace Music, 2011)

With the Wildare Express

- Walk On By (Brunswick, 1970) – recorded in 1967–68

With the Godfathers of Groove

- The Masters of Groove – Meet Dr. No (Jazzateria, 2001)
- The Masters of Groove – Meet DJ-9 (Jazzateria, 2006)
- The Godfathers of Groove (18th & Vine, 2007)
- The Godfathers of Groove – 3 (18th & Vine, 2009)

=== As sideman ===
- New York Funkies, Hip Hop Bop! (Meldac [jp], 1995) – with Stanley Turrentine, Ed Cherry
- Grant Green, Jr., Jungle Strut (Venus, 1997)
- Grant Green, Jr., Introducing G.G. (Jazzateria, 2002)
- Melvin Sparks, What You Hear Is What You Get (Savant, 2001)
