= Arkansas (Bruce Hampton album) =

Studio album by Col. Bruce Hampton
- Released: 1987
- Studios: Southern Living Studios, Atlanta, Georgia
- Genre: Southern rock
- Length: 45:58
- Labels: Landslide Records; LD-1012
- Producers: Col. Bruce Hampton, Ricky Keller

Bruce Hampton chronology
Isles of Langerhan (1982)	Arkansas (1987)	Col. Bruce Hampton & the Aquarium Rescue Unit (1992)

Arkansas is an album by Col. Bruce Hampton. It was recorded at Southern Living Studios in Atlanta, Georgia, and was released on LP in 1987 by Landslide Records. In 2000, Terminus Records reissued the album on CD. On the album, Hampton is joined by a large group of guest musicians.

== Reception ==
Professional ratings
Review scores
Source	Rating
AllMusic	4.5/5 stars

The editors of AllMusic awarded the album 4½ stars. Reviewer Robert Gordon wrote: "This 'Southern Captain Beefheart' misses, but this Colonel (Ret.) is original."

A writer for Billboard stated: "Hampton's dadaist vision of rock with duo the Late Bronze Age earned him fans on the outer fringes. This solo album is more assorted weirdness aimed at listeners from the Beefheart school, and it boasts a strong cast of support players."

Byron Coley, writing for Spin, called the album "a sweet mom of a thing to hear," and commented: "Like a screwier version of Van Dyke Parks, Hampton delves into all sortsa cultural rootage... This is the sorta record that should appeal to anybody who gave up on Zappa after Weasels Ripped My Flesh."

Swampland's James Calemine remarked: "Colonel Bruce's relentless humor and protean variety place him in the pantheon of American oddball geniuses like Frank Zappa and John Cage. Arkansas—like a horrific picture or a beautiful face—lingers in the mind and haunts the memory long after it is heard."

== Track listing ==
All compositions by Bruce Hampton

1. "Arkansas" – 3:52
2. "Elevator to the Moon" – 2:10
3. "Throndossull" – 4:50
4. "Brato Ganibe" – 2:10
5. "Strange Voices" – 4:40
6. "Fixin to Die" – 4:17
7. "Basically Frightened" – 2:45
8. "Mr. Kane" – 3:30
9. "Zumpano's Retreat" – 4:00
10. "Baseball Tickets" – 2:49
11. "Morgan" – 1:38 (bonus track on CD reissue)
12. "Cold Mountain" – 4:22 (bonus track on CD reissue)

== Personnel ==
- Col. Bruce Hampton – vocals, slide mandolin, chazoid
- Lincoln Metcalfe (Ricky Keller) – bass, horns, potarth
- Paul Barrere – guitar
- Tinsley Ellis – guitar
- Lamar Metcalfe (Bill Hatcher) – guitar
- T Lavitz – keyboards
- Rev. Oliver Wells – keyboards
- Sonny Emory – drums
- Jeff Metcalfe – drums
- Walter Brewer – drums
- Yonrico Scott – drums
- Jimmy Herring – guitar (tracks 11 and 12)
- Jeff Sipe – drums (tracks 11 and 12)
- Rev. Jeff Mosier – banjo (tracks 11 and 12)
- Oteil Burbridge – bass (tracks 11 and 12)
- Matt Mundy – mandolin (tracks 11 and 12)
