= The Late Bronze Age =

The Late Bronze Age was an American band of the 1980s that performed surrealist, eclectic, and unusual music described by some as "unabashedly weird." It was fronted by Bruce Hampton, in his first appearance under the "Col. Bruce Hampton (ret.)" persona. Although not commercially successful, the group won critical praise as "a band that does 'everything.'" The band evolved from an earlier Hampton project, New Ice Age, which was his first group effort after the Hampton Grease Band split up.

The group released two albums, Outside Looking Out in 1980 and Isles of Langerhan in 1982.

They appeared in the 1983 film, Getting It On, credited as The Party Band.

== Band members and roles ==
Bruce Hampton, under the persona of "Colonel Hampton B. Coles" (ret.) - Vocals, slide guitar, mandolin, chazoid.
Billy McPherson, under the persona of Ben "Pops" Thornton - Guitar, vocals.
Lincoln Metcalf - Bass guitar, synthesizer, vocals.
Bubba Phreon - Drums, trombone, percussion, vocals.
