= Love Bug (Reuben Wilson album) =

Studio album by Reuben Wilson
- Released: 1969
- Recorded: March 21, 1969
- Studio: Van Gelder Studio, Englewood Cliffs, NJ
- Genre: Soul jazz
- Length: 42:17 original LP; 50:14 CD reissue
- Label: Blue Note; BST 84317
- Producer: Francis Wolff

Reuben Wilson chronology
On Broadway (1968)	Love Bug (1969)	Blue Mode (1969)

Love Bug is the second album by American organist Reuben Wilson recorded in 1969 and released on the Blue Note label. The CD reissue added one bonus track.

== Reception ==
The Allmusic review by Stephen Thomas Erlewine awarded the album 4 stars and stated "Love Bug was an attempt to establish Reuben Wilson as an organist with either the vision of Larry Young or the fiery style of John Patton, and while it comes up short on both accounts, it nevertheless remains quite enjoyable".

Professional ratings
Review scores
Source	Rating
Allmusic	4/5 stars

== Track listing ==
All compositions by Reuben Wilson except as noted

1. "Hot Rod" - 6:26
2. "I'm Gonna Make You Love Me" (Kenneth Gamble, Leon Huff, Jerry Ross) - 5:32
3. "I Say a Little Prayer" (Bacharach, David) - 8:10
4. "Love Bug" - 8:11
5. "Stormy" (Buddy Buie, J.R. Cobb) - 5:46
6. "Back Out" - 8:12
7. "Hold On, I'm Comin'" (Isaac Hayes, Porter) - 7:57 Bonus track on CD reissue

== Personnel ==
- Reuben Wilson - organ
- Lee Morgan - trumpet
- George Coleman - tenor saxophone
- Grant Green - guitar
- Jimmy Lewis - electric bass (track 7)
- Leo Morris - drums
