= Bernadette Seacrest =

American vocalist (born 1965)

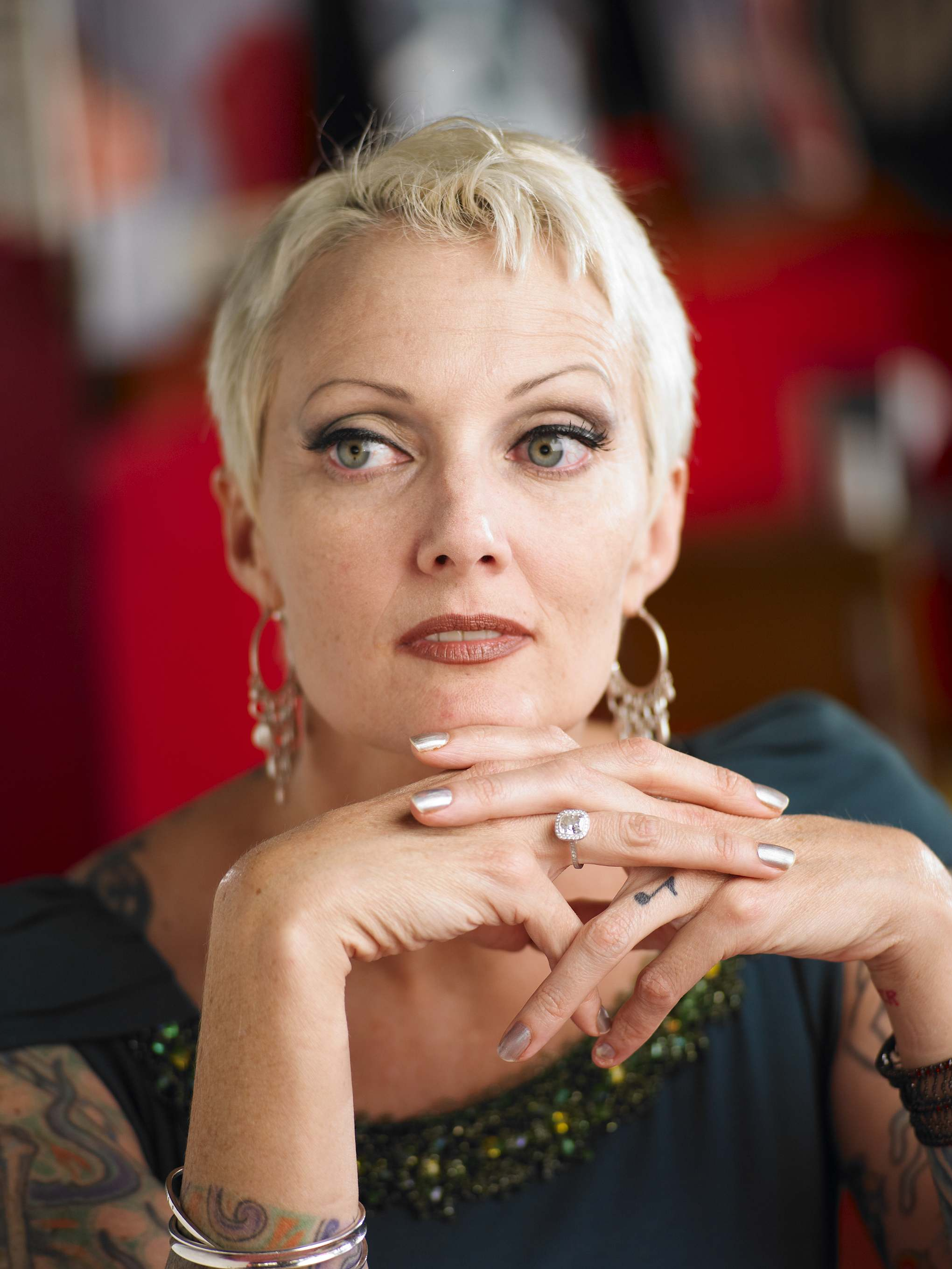
- Bernadette Seacrest in 2009, Atlanta, GA Photo: Jon Kownacki

Background information
- Born: Laura Bernadette Seacrest; 1965 (age 60–61)
- Origin: Venice, California
- Genres: Swing noir, jazz, Americana
- Occupation: Musician
- Instrument: Vocals
- Years active: 2001–present
- Labels: Thrillbomb, Independent
- Website: bernadetteseacrest.com

Bernadette Seacrest is an American vocalist born in San Francisco, California.

== Career ==
In 2001 Seacrest began singing for The Long Goners, a Rockabilly band originating in Albuquerque, New Mexico that shared the stage with Hank Williams III, Big Sandy & His Fly-Rite Boys, Jonathan Richman and Bastard Sons of Johnny Cash. Bernadette left The Long Goners to form Bernadette Seacrest and her Yes Men in 2003. The band released their debut album "No More Music by the Suckers" in 2004. After touring extensively throughout the United States and France the band released a second album in 2005 "Live in Santa Fe."

In 2006 Bernadette Seacrest relocated to Atlanta, Georgia to form Bernadette Seacrest and her Provocateurs with guitarist/songwriter Charles Williams of The Bonaventure Quartet and bassist Kris Dale of The Quark Alliance. In 2007 she was awarded the critic's pick Best Atlanta Vocalist in Atlanta's long established alternative press publication Creative Loafing. The new group released their debut album "The Filthy South Sessions" in December 2009. The album was well received in a number of published reviews and was followed by two more tours in France.

In 2016, “Lust and Madness” was released under the band name “Bernadette Seacrest & Kris Dale” on CD, digital and vinyl formats. The album includes duet performances with Francine Reed and Mike Geier, both of whom have made occasional guest performances at live shows. Musicians include Kris Dale, Marlon Patton, Noah Thomas and R L Martin.

In 2021, “My Love Is” was released in digital format. A special edition 12-inch 45 rpm vinyl features Seacrest on the cover in the titled work “Majorette” – created by surrealist photographer Joel-Peter Witkin in 2003. Musicians include – Kris Dale, Darren Stanley, Pat Bova. The track “Vampire” was written by former bandmate Pat Bova.

== Discography ==
- No More Music by the Suckers (ThrillBomb, 2004)
- Live in Santa Fe (Independent, 2005)
- The Filthy South Sessions (Independent, 2009)
- Lust and Madness with Kris Dale (Independent, 2016)
- My Love Is with Kris Dale & Darren Stanley (Independent, 2021)
