= Pecchio =

Pecchio is an Italian surname. Notable people with the surname include:

- Daniel Pecchio (born 1947), American bass guitarist
- Ted Pecchio (fl. 2006–2009), American bass guitarist, son of Daniel
