= Movin' On (Reuben Wilson album) =

Studio album by Reuben Wilson
- Released: October 24, 2006
- Recorded: July 17 & 18, 2006
- Studio: Tedesco Studios, Paramus, NJ
- Genre: Jazz
- Length: 46:59
- Label: Savant; SCD 2076
- Producer: Melvin Sparks

Reuben Wilson chronology
| Fun House (2005) | Movin' On (2006) | Azure Te (2009) |

Movin' On is a studio album by organist Reuben Wilson which was recorded in 2006 and released on the Savant label.

== Reception ==
Professional ratings
Review scores
| Source | Rating |
|---|---|
| Allmusic | 4/5 stars |

In his review on Allmusic, Scott Yanow states "The music is reminiscent of the late '60s with catchy grooves, long vamps and some heated solos .... The mixture of basic originals and R&B covers works well and even if the program is not all that memorable, the good-time music will please fans of the idiom". In JazzTimes, Bill Milkowski called the album a "largely smooth-jazz offering" and said "the playing here is purely pedestrian ... Groove-mongers may dig this, but serious B3 mavens may want to pass"

== Track listing ==
All compositions by Reuben Wilson except where noted

1. "Movin' On" (J. Cunningham, C. Carson Parks) – 4:11
2. "Slick Willie" – 4:58
3. "Waita Minute" – 7:14
4. "Miss Mansfield" (G. Samuels) – 5:12
5. "Funk Farm" (Grant Green Jr., Reuben Wilson) – 7:03
6. "Watch Me Fly" – 4:26
7. "Feel Free" – 4:59
8. "What You Won't Do for Love" (Bobby Caldwell, Alfons Kettner) – 4:13
9. "Caught Up in the Rapture" (Gary Glenn, Dianne Quander) – 4:43

== Personnel ==
- Reuben Wilson – Hammond B-3
- Robert Chaseman – tenor saxophone (tracks 1, 3, 5 & 8)
- Grant Green Jr. – guitar, vocals
- Wilbur Bascomb – bass (tracks 1, 2, 4, 6 & 9)
- Shawn Hill (tracks 1, 2, 4, 6 & 9), J.T. Lewis (tracks 3, 5, 7 & 8) – drums
