= On Broadway (Reuben Wilson album) =

Studio album by Reuben Wilson
- Released: 1968
- Recorded: October 4, 1968
- Studio: Van Gelder Studio, Englewood Cliffs, NJ
- Genre: Jazz
- Length: 39:55
- Label: Blue Note; BST 84295
- Producer: Francis Wolff

Reuben Wilson chronology
On Broadway (1968)	Love Bug (1969)

On Broadway is the debut album by American organist Reuben Wilson, recorded in 1968 and released on the Blue Note label.

== Reception ==
The Allmusic review by Stephen Thomas Erlewine awarded the album 3 stars and stated "On Broadway is a successful groove record, but in comparison to the two albums that followed, it's a little uneven".

Professional ratings
Review scores
Source	Rating
Allmusic	3/5 stars

== Track listing ==
1. "On Broadway" (Leiber, Mann, Stoller, Weil) - 8:17
2. "Baby I Love You" (Jimmy Holiday, Ronnie Shannon) - 5:28
3. "Ain't That Peculiar" (Moore, Robinson, White, Tarplin) - 6:50
4. "Ronnie's Bonnie" (Reuben Wilson) - 10:00
5. "Poinciana" (Nat Simon, Bernier) - 9:20

== Personnel ==
- Reuben Wilson - organ
- Trevor Lawrence - tenor saxophone
- Malcolm Riddick - guitar
- Tommy Derrick - drums
