= Isles of Langerhan =

Studio album by the Late Bronze Age
- Released: 1982
- Recorded: 1982
- Studio: Eddy Offord, East Point, Georgia
- Genre: Experimental rock
- Length: 45:20
- Label: Landslide; LD-1006
- Producer: Eddy Offord, the Late Bronze Age

The Late Bronze Age chronology
Outside Looking Out (1980)	Isles of Langerhan (1982)

Bruce Hampton chronology
Outside Looking Out (1980)	Isles of Langerhan (1982)	Arkansas (1987)

Isles of Langerhan is the second and final album by the Late Bronze Age, a collaboration between musicians Bruce Hampton and Billy McPherson. It was recorded in 1982, and was released on LP later that year by Landslide Records. In 2002, the album was reissued on CD by Terminus Records.

On the album, Hampton appears as "Hampton B. Coles (Ret.)," and McPherson is listed as "Ben 'Pops' Thornton." Additional musicians are bassist Ricky Keller, listed as "Lincoln Metcalfe," and drummer Jerry Fields, listed as "Bubba Phreon." The album was produced by Eddy Offord, best known for his work on albums by Emerson, Lake & Palmer and Yes. The cover art is credited to James Flournoy Holmes, and is based on the artist's "vision of having a girl throw water in the air and catching it on film."

The album title is a misspelled reference to the regions of the pancreas known as islets of Langerhans. The song of the same name includes a line that reads "I'd rather be in the Isles of Langerhan."

== Reception ==
Professional ratings
Review scores
Source	Rating
AllMusic	3/5 stars

In an AllMusic review of the original LP release, Jesse Jarnow wrote: "Hampton's bizarre proclamations are translated into flaming fusion runs... This is certainly not the best place to begin exploring Hampton's body of work, but it's not a bad place to end up." Ann Wickstrom, in her AllMusic review of the CD reissue, remarked: "the music rocks hard and the grooves are deep... this is essentially great rock & roll that was way ahead of its time when originally released."

Robert Palmer, writing for The New York Times, stated that, in comparison with the band's debut album Outside Looking Out, the music on Isles of Langerhan is "tighter and punchier... with the players' rhythm-and-blues roots attractively exposed," while the lyrics "take a long, amused look at social rituals." Palmer praised the playing as "intricate and knotty... with Mr. Thornton's snaking guitar lines and jazzy saxophone taking dominant roles."

Hal Horowitz of Creative Loafing noted that Hampton's "atonal, throaty ranting, non-sequitur-heavy lyrics, outrageous song titles... and jolting tempo changes" are "an acquired taste," but called the album a powerful example of "Hampton's... warped genius."

== Track listing ==
1. "The Isles of Langerhan" – 3:30
2. "Time Is Free" – 4:45
3. "Invest in Real Estate" – 3:07
4. "Sea Cow" – 3:29
5. "In the Woods" – 0:37
6. "Walking with Zambi (Try Hoodah)" – 2:59
7. "Pen Pals" – 3:28
8. "Celtic Annoyance" – 2:58
9. "Yonder Space" – 6:16
10. "Mankind" – 2:37
11. "Lessons in Equipment" – 2:44
12. "Selah" – 1:12
13. "A Sensitive Pond and the Sailor" – 5:03 (CD reissue bonus track)
14. "Jack the Rabbit" – 2:36 (CD reissue bonus track)

== Personnel ==
- Hampton B. Coles (Ret.) (Bruce Hampton) – mandolin, vocals
- Ben "Pops" Thornton (Billy McPherson) – guitar, piano, vocals
- Lincoln Metcalfe (Ricky Keller) – bass, guitar, keyboards, vocals
- Bubba Phreon (Jerry Fields) – drums, percussion, trombone, vocals
