= Outside Looking Out =

Studio album by The Late Bronze Age
- Released: 1980
- Recorded: 1980
- Studios: Channel One Studios, Atlanta, Georgia; Signal Sound Studios, Atlanta, Georgia
- Genre: Experimental rock
- Length: 47:44
- Labels: Landslide Records; LD-1001
- Producers: Hampton B. Coles (Ret.) (Bruce Hampton) and Ben "Pops" Thornton (Billy McPherson)

The Late Bronze Age chronology
Outside Looking Out (1980)	Isles of Langerhan (1982)

Bruce Hampton chronology
One Ruined Life of a Bronze Tourist (1978)	Outside Looking Out (1980)	Isles of Langerhan (1982)

Outside Looking Out is the debut album by The Late Bronze Age, a collaboration between musicians Bruce Hampton and Billy McPherson. It was recorded in the summer and fall of 1980, and was released on LP later that year by Landslide Records as the first entry in their catalogue. In 2002, the album was reissued on CD by Terminus Records.

On the album, Hampton appears as "Hampton B. Coles (Ret.)," and McPherson is listed as "Ben 'Pops' Thornton." The cover photo features Hampton made up to look like a much older man, while McPherson is seen wearing a marching band jacket. The duo are joined by a number of guest musicians, and the credits also list bogus players supposedly performing on imaginary instruments such as "oozic" and "potarth."

== Reception ==
Professional ratings
Review scores
Source	Rating
AllMusic	3/5 stars

In a review for AllMusic, Ann Wickstrom wrote: "Though Hampton's entire body of work can be considered a bit bizarre by any standard, this one just might take the cake." She described the music as "all over the map," but acknowledged that "the highly varied instrumentation and way-beyond-peculiar lyrics" set the album apart. She concluded: "You have to love a guy who did as he pleased with the wacky clutter that was rambling around in his head."

Robert Palmer, writing for The New York Times, called the album "a refreshing antidote to both predictable radio fare and the more self-conscious experimentation of much of the current rock vanguard." He noted that "the songs are cleverly put together and amiably sung, the musicianship is first-rate, and some of the lyrics do make some sort of sense," while the musicians "never take themselves too seriously."

Hal Horowitz of Creative Loafing noted that Hampton's "atonal, throaty ranting, non-sequitur-heavy lyrics, outrageous song titles... and jolting tempo changes" are "an acquired taste," but called the album a powerful example of "Hampton's... warped genius."

== Track listing ==
1. "NCO Housing" – 2:59
2. "King Greed" – 3:25
3. "A Stained Soul Cringes at the Small Details in the Mirror of Embarrassment" – 3:42
4. "Fat Brooms Brush the Number Bush" – 3:53
5. "Farmers Earn Livings" – 4:35
6. "The Late Bronze Age" – 3:05
7. "Pen Pals Diminished" – 4:00
8. "When in Doubt Go Completely Out... Or Do Something Familiar" – 2:00
9. "Merged Moons" – 5:59
10. "Rehearsals for Fainting (Been False Accused)" – 4:02
11. "Seven Men in a Bazooka" – 9:02 (CD reissue bonus track)

== Personnel ==
- Hampton B. Coles (Ret.) (Bruce Hampton) – vocals, slide guitar, chazoid
- Ben "Pops" Thornton (Billy McPherson) – vocals, guitar, electric bass, synthesizer, keyboards, tenor saxophone, clarinet, bass clarinet, flute
- Paul McCandless – oboe
- Father Eal Sagwag – trombone, electric piano
- Tim Miller – violin
- Adan Abbott – cello, alto saxophone
- Mark Vigorito – cello, alto saxophone
- Robert Cheatham – cello, alto saxophone
- Mason – vibraphone, bass
- Yazam Parvanta – tabla
- R. Albert Nicholson – drums
- David Earle Johnson – percussion
- Tom Fatterusso – oozic
- Col. Crawford Boyd – potarth, bawa
