= Glenn Phillips (guitarist) =

- Born: Glenn Phillips
- Genres: Rock
- Occupation: Musician
- Instrument: Guitar
- Website: glennphillips.com

Audio sample
- "Dogs" from Lost at Sea (1975): file; help

Glenn Phillips is a guitarist and composer with 18 albums released under his own name. He has also played on many other recordings, including those by his first group, the Hampton Grease Band.

== Career ==
Phillips was a founding member, guitarist and songwriter for the obscure Hampton Grease Band, which formed in 1967. Their double album Music to Eat was released on Columbia Records in 1971 and went on to become a much sought-after collector's item. It was also cited as an influence by later groups like Widespread Panic, Phish, and Pere Ubu. In 1996, it was rereleased by Sony to a great deal of acclaim (In June 1996, Spin magazine gave it a 9 out 10 "Near Perfect" rating). Over the course of the band's six-year career, they played with a wide variety of groups, including the Grateful Dead, Jimi Hendrix, The Allman Brothers Band and Frank Zappa. Zappa was a big fan of the band, and they played with him at the Fillmore East; Phillips jammed with Zappa that evening, as did John Lennon and Yoko Ono.

Phillips' solo career began in 1973. He frequently sat in with Little Feat back then, and in an interview, Lowell George called him "the most amazing guitarist I've ever seen." Phillips recorded his first solo album Lost at Sea in his home and put it out himself in 1975. The record anticipated the do-it-yourself movement that later overtook rock music. The highly influential British BBC Radio 1 disk-jockey John Peel regularly played the album, at the time available in the Uk only as an import; it subsequently came second in a reader's poll held by Britain's leading music paper Melody Maker. Phillips was then contacted by the head of Virgin Records, Richard Branson (later to start up further companies under the Virgin brand) who signed Phillips and released Lost at Sea on Virgin's subsidiary Caroline Records label. To support this release, Phillips toured Europe extensively - including a show at London's famous Rainbow Theatre.

Since then, Phillips has toured frequently, and the fact that his music fits into no particular niche has led to a wide spectrum of double-bills over the years with groups as varied as Captain Beefheart, Eric Johnson, Bo Diddley, Patti Smith, Roy Buchanan, Talking Heads, Albert King, Joe Satriani and The Ventures. During that time, his albums have garnered a great deal of critical acclaim, and those reviews focus on the unique, unclassifiable nature of his music; its intensely emotional impact; and his seemingly limitless virtuosity. Guitar World (Nov. 1983) compared him to Hendrix and Jeff Beck, and his double-CD retrospective Echoes 1975-1985 received a 4-star review in Rolling Stone (Jan. 21, 1993), as did his Supreme Court album with Jeff Calder (of The Swimming Pool Q's).

Phillips has also collaborated with Bob Weir of the Grateful Dead and Pete Buck of R.E.M., who said this about him in Musician magazine: "One of the reasons I don't play solos is because I grew up listening to Glenn Phillips. He never ceases to amaze me." Phillips has also recorded albums with Henry Kaiser. His music has regularly been played on NPR since 1990. In 2015 Mike Holbrook interviewed Phillips on his radio show where he gave a live performance of "Dogs" from the Lost at Sea album. Phillips reported the song's inspiration, a dog given to him by Holbrook.

== Selected discography ==
=== Albums ===
- Music to Eat (1971) [Hampton Grease Band] US Columbia 30581 & 30582 Holland CBS S66296 double album, (1996) US Shotput/Sony/Legacy C2K 67483 double CD reissue
- Lost at Sea (1975) US Snow Star 1, rest of world Caroline 1519/Virgin - reissued in 2015 on Shagrat Records as a double-vinyl set with various previously unreleased alternate takes
- Swim in the Wind (1977) Virgin 2087
- Dark Lights (1980) [Glenn Phillips Band] US Snow Star 3
- Razor Pocket (1982) [Glenn Phillips Band] US Snow Star 4
- St. Valentine's Day (1984) [Glenn Phillips Band] US Snow Star 5
- Live (1985) [Glenn Phillips Band] US Shanachie Records 82006
- Elevator (1987) [Glenn Phillips Band] US SST 136, SST CD 136
- Scratched by the Rabbit (1990) US ESD 80432, rest of world Demon Records Fiend CD 180
- Supreme Court Goes Electric (1994) [Supreme Court] US DB Recs DB 156
- Walking through Walls (1996) US Shotput/Sony WK3700
- Angel Sparks (2003) US Gaff Music GM456
- Guitar Party (2003) [Henry Kaiser - Glenn Phillips] US Gaff Music GM 0130
- Sun Hex (2010) [Supreme Court with Glenn Phillips & Jeff Calder] US Snow Star Records SS14

=== Singles/EPs ===
- Steve Hillage/Glenn Phillips (1977) Virgin VDJ 23 promotional tour single contains "Lies" from Swim in the Wind
- Flyback/She Don't Know (1980) US Snow Star 3.1 single from Dark Lights

=== Compilation albums ===
- Echoes 1975-1985 (1992) US East Side Digital, rest of world Virgin CDVM 9015 double CD compilation

=== Various Artists compilation albums ===
- Playback (1971) US Columbia AS 23 promotional EP contains "Maria" from Music to Eat [Hampton Grease Band]
- Audio Rumbles Vol. 1 (1997) US Ptolemaic Terrascope on "Live Impro 1970" [Hampton Grease Band]
- No Age Compilation (1987) US SST CD 102 contains "Vista Cruiser" from Elevator [Glenn Phillips Band]
- If 6 Was 9: A Tribute to Jimi Hendrix (1990) US Communion 18, rest of world Imaginary, on "If 6 Was 9" from Guitar Party [Henry Kaiser - Glenn Phillips]
- Passed Normal Vol. 6 & 7 (1993) US FOT Records FOT PN67 on "Cobra" - recorded live at San Francisco's Great American Music Hall within a week of the same song's being recorded in a studio with the same band for Guitar Party.

=== Appearances on others' albums ===
- Marrying for Money (1986) [Henry Kaiser] Germany Minor Music 1010 on "Murder One"
- Re-Marrying for Money (1988) [Henry Kaiser] US SST CD 222 Marrying for Money LP re-released on CD with 4 extra tracks, on "Murder One"
- Those Who Know History Are Doomed to Repeat It (1988) [Henry Kaiser] US SST CD 198 on "Dark Star/The Other One"
- Helen Wheels & the Skeleton Crew (2001) [Helen Wheels & the Skeleton Crew] US Jargon Records JRCD 1101
- Electric Willie A Tribute To Willie Dixon (2010) [Henry Kaiser & Elliott Sharp] Yellowbird

== Sources ==
=== Rolling Stone ===
- Rolling Stone- by Parke Puterbaugh, Aug. 20, 1981
- Rolling Stone- by Errol Somay, March 17, 1983
- Rolling Stone- by David Fricke, Nov. 15, 1990
- Rolling Stone- by Parke Puterbaugh, Jan. 21, 1993
- Rolling Stone- by Parke Puterbaugh, Feb 10, 1994
- Rolling Stone- by David Fricke, March 21, 1996
- Rolling Stone- by David Fricke, June 12, 2003

=== Guitar Player ===
- Guitar Player - by Jim Schwartz, Aug. 1981
- Guitar Player- by Mike Varney, Aug. 1982
- Guitar Player- by Tom Mulhern, Sept. 1983
- Guitar Player- by Tom Mulhern, Aug. 1984
- Guitar Player- by Bruce Malamut, Jan. 1986
- Guitar Player- Glenn Phillips: Have Guitar, Will Flail by Mark Dery, March 1988
- Guitar Player- by Jim Ferguson, May 1991
- Guitar Player- Glenn Phillips' Voice In the Night, May 1992
- Guitar Player- June 1996
- Guitar Player- Sept. 2003
- Spin Magazine - by Byron Cooley, June 1996
- Stereo Review - Dec. 1996
- Stereo Review- November 1990
- Musician Magazine - Glenn Phillips' Psycho-Guitar: The Triumphs & Trials of Being Yourself by David Fricke, Feb. 1983

=== Musician Magazine ===
- Musician Magazine- by David Fricke, Aug. 1984
- Musician Magazine- by Jon Young, Jan., 1986
- Musician Magazine- April 1991

=== Relix ===
- Relix - by Mick Skidmore, May 1992
- Relix - by Mick Skidmore, Nov. 1993
- Relix - by Mick Skidmore, June 1996
- Relix - Glenn Phillips: Independently Minded, by Mick Skidmore, June 1997
- Relix - by Mick Skidmore, April/May 2003

=== Guitar World ===
- Guitar World - by Bruce Malamut, Nov. 1983
- Guitar World - by Bruce Malamut, Nov. 1984
- Guitar World - by Tom Mulhern, Jan. 1986
- Guitar World - July 1988

=== Guitar ===
- Vintage Guitar Magazine - Glenn Phillips: On His Own Terms by Willie G. Moseley, March 1998
- Vintage Guitar Magazine - by Ken Johnson, July 2003

== Others ==
- Men's Journal- by Anthony DeCurtis, Dec. 1996
- Unknown Legends of Rock 'n' Roll by Ritchie Unterberger, 1998, Miller Freeman Books ISBN 0-87930-534-7
- Mix Magazine- Glenn Phillips: Tales Of The Unknown Guitar Hero by Bill Milkowski, June 1988
- Goldmine Magazine - Interview with Glenn Phillips by Russell Hall, 1996
- The Hartford Advocate, by Alan Bisport, July 2003
- Metroland (New York) - by David Greenberger, Sept. 2003
- New Musical Express(UK) - by John Lober, July 10, 1976
- Sounds (UK) - by Tony Mitchell, Nov. 5, 1977
- Melody Maker (UK) - July, 1976
