= Fun House (Reuben Wilson album) =

Studio album by Reuben Wilson
- Released: August 2, 2005
- Recorded: December 28, 2004
- Studio: Van Gelder Studio, Englewood Cliffs, NJ
- Genre: Jazz
- Length: 54:15
- Label: Savant; SCD 2064
- Producer: Melvin Sparks

Reuben Wilson chronology
| Boogaloo to the Beastie Boys (2001) | Fun House (2005) | Movin' On (2005) |

Fun House is an album by organist Reuben Wilson which was recorded in 2004 and released on the Savant label the following year.

== Reception ==
Professional ratings
Review scores
| Source | Rating |
|---|---|
| Allmusic | 4/5 stars |

In his review on Allmusic, Scott Yanow states "The band is tight and brings back the sound of the classic organ combo, even though it utilizes an alto rather than the usual tenor. This is fun music, easily recommended to fans of soul-jazz". In JazzTimes, Owen Cordle called the album "a quartet session that attests to the continued viability of the funk and soul-jazz genre in these days of revival" and said "The grooves are fat and crisp ... You can put this album on when you need to clear the air, get back to the basics and dig a little fun"

== Track listing ==
All compositions by Reuben Wilson except where noted

1. "Easy Talk" (Gene Redd, Hank Marr) – 5:43
2. "Fun House" – 5:32
3. "For the Love of You" (The Isley Brothers, Chris Jasper) – 6:38
4. "Ronnie's Bonnie" – 7:42
5. "Love Time" – 7:04
6. "Sweet Feet" – 6:27
7. "Minor Yours" – 6:16
8. "Loft Funk" (Mike Clark) – 8:53

== Personnel ==
- Reuben Wilson – Hammond B-3
- Cochemea Gastelum – tenor saxophone (tracks 1–6 & 8)
- Melvin Sparks – guitar
- Mike Clark – drums
