= Earl Turbinton =

American jazz musician (1941–2007)

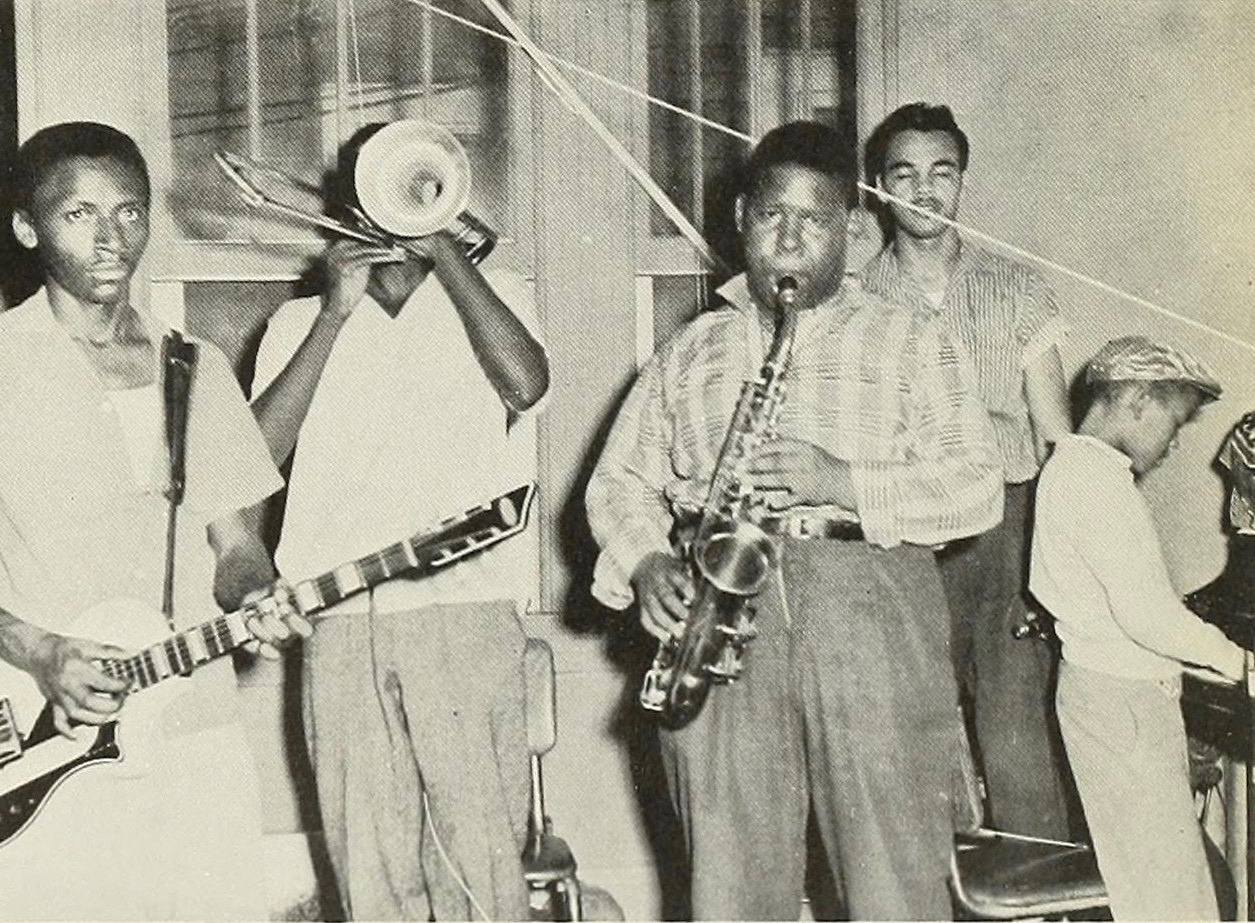
- Turbinton plays alto sax with a small band for a Tulane University party, c. 1957

Background information
- Born: September 23, 1941
- Died: August 3, 2007 (aged 65)
- Genres: Jazz
- Occupation: Musician
- Other names: Naim Akban Ben-Tur; The African Cowboy

Earl Turbinton Jr., also known as Naim Akban Ben-Tur and The African Cowboy (September 23, 1941 – August 3, 2007) was an American saxophonist associated for decades with the music scene of New Orleans.

== Career ==
Turbinton worked as a session musician for local R&B recordings from the late 1950s. He became involved with the New Orleans jazz scene early in his career, and became involved with a New Orleans project called Jazz Workshop, which gave music lessons to children and had its own club. Though it closed after a short time, Turbinton had intended for it to serve a place in the city's musical life analogous to that of Preservation Hall, but for newer jazz styles.

Turbinton worked extensively in soul and R&B idioms in the 1960s, playing studio dates in New York, Detroit, and Los Angeles. He played alongside his brother, Willie Tee, in the funk group The Gaturs, and toured with Jerry Butler, the Four Tops, B. B. King, The Supremes, and The Temptations. In jazz, he worked with Joe Zawinul and Buster Williams in the 1970s.

Turbinton took the name "The African Cowboy" in the 1980s as a protest against Reagan administration attempts to cut federal arts funding.

== Death ==
Turbinton died aged 65 on August 3, 2007, after a stroke, heart attack, and a bout with cancer. He was funeralized at Our Lady Star of the Sea Catholic Church in New Orleans.

== Discography ==
- Brothers for Life, with Willie Tee (Rounder Records, 1987)
- Dominion and Sustenance (Prog Records, 1998)
