= Music to Eat =

1971 album by Hampton Grease Band

Studio album by Hampton Grease Band
- Released: April 7, 1971
- Genre: Blues rock, Psychedelic rock, Proto-punk
- Length: 88:26
- Label: Columbia
- Producer: Hampton Grease Band, Tom McNamee, David Baker

Bruce Hampton chronology
Music to Eat (1971)	One Ruined Life of a Bronze Tourist (1978)

Music to Eat is an album by the avant garde rock group Hampton Grease Band. Their only album, and the first album by a band fronted by Bruce Hampton, it was released in 1971 as a two-disc LP.

Music to Eat did not sell many copies. Despite this, it has since garnered enough interest to warrant Columbia to officially re-issue the album on CD in 1996 and on vinyl in 2018. Like albums by Captain Beefheart, Frank Zappa, and Pere Ubu, Music to Eat helped establish a quirky, experimental version of rock music.

== Reception ==
Professional ratings
Review scores
Source	Rating
AllMusic	4.5/5 stars
Spin	9/10 stars
The Vinyl District	A

Writing for AllMusic, critic Richie Unterberger noted that while the Hampton Grease Band could not quite match the levels of instrumental virtuosity in Zappa's or Beefheart's bands, they were even closer to the "lunatic fringe" than those performers.

In a review for Spin, Byron Coley stated: "Music to Eat was one of the leftfield high points of the Nixon Era, and its essential message about the freedom and power that come from being truly weird remains soothing balm."

In his book on jam bands, Dean Budnick noted the album's "underlying spunk and unmitigated weirdness."

The Vinyl District's Joseph Neff called the album "a grand example of beautifully haywire humanity creating spectacularly singular art," and "one of the true classics of expansionist, genre-bending rock."

Regarding the 1996 CD reissue, the Chicago Reader's Peter Margasak wrote: "Even today it's probably too strange for most listeners–yet it's just as fresh, inventive, and vibrant as it was 25 years ago."

John Corbett called Music to Eat "wondrous," and praised the band's "zany singer-leader, beautiful long-form songs, sinewy guitar, creative writing."

A reviewer at Head Heritage stated that the album "stands alone in the rock canon," and called it "damn near a masterpiece that almost exists outside of history."

In an article for It's Psychedelic Baby! Magazine, Phillip R. Eubanks described the album as "wild happy craziness," and praised the "absolutely excellent guitar players" and "absolutely fantastic drummer and bass player." He concluded: "It is a light hearted beautiful trip... I love it."

Chuck Reece of The Bitter Southerner stated that when he first heard Music to Eat, it made him "feel like somebody had sawed off the top of [his] head and poured in large quantities of Things Teenage Country Boys Didn’t Understand." Upon further listening, he concluded that the musicians had "created a place of true, unadulterated, joyous freedom that gave license to damned near every Southern musician who followed."

Aquarium Drunkard's Jesse Jarnow commented that the album "seemed like music remade from the ground up in a new and pleasing way. The words ricocheted off the meticulous and always-moving instrumental parts, twin guitars springing into conversations that might be telepathic improvisations or bananas compositions."

== Track listing ==
Side one
No.	Title	Writer(s)	Length
1.	"Halifax"	Glenn Phillips, Bruce Hampton	19:42
Total length:			19:42

Side two
No.	Title	Writer(s)	Length
1.	"Maria"	Phillips	5:33
2.	"Six"	Harold Kelling, Hampton	19:32
Total length:			25:05

Side three
No.	Title	Writer(s)	Length
1.	"Evans: a) Egyptian Beaver b) Evans"	Kelling, Hampton, Phillips, Jerry Fields, Mike Holbrook	12:28
2.	"Lawton"	Phillips, Fields	7:48
Total length:			20:16

Side four
No.	Title	Writer(s)	Length
1.	"Hey Old Lady and Bert's Song"	Charlie Phillips, Kelling, Hampton	3:22
2.	"Hendon: a) Spray Paint b) Major Bones c) Sewell Park d) Improvisation"	Kelling, Hampton, Phillips, Fields, Holbrook	20:10
Total length:			23:33

== Personnel ==
- Bruce Hampton — vocals, trumpet
- Glenn Phillips — guitar, saxophone
- Harold Kelling — guitar, vocals
- Mike Holbrook — bass
- Jerry Fields — percussion, vocals
