= Variety Playhouse =

Music venue and former movie theater in Atlanta, Georgia, United States

Coordinates: 33.76375°N 84.35111°W

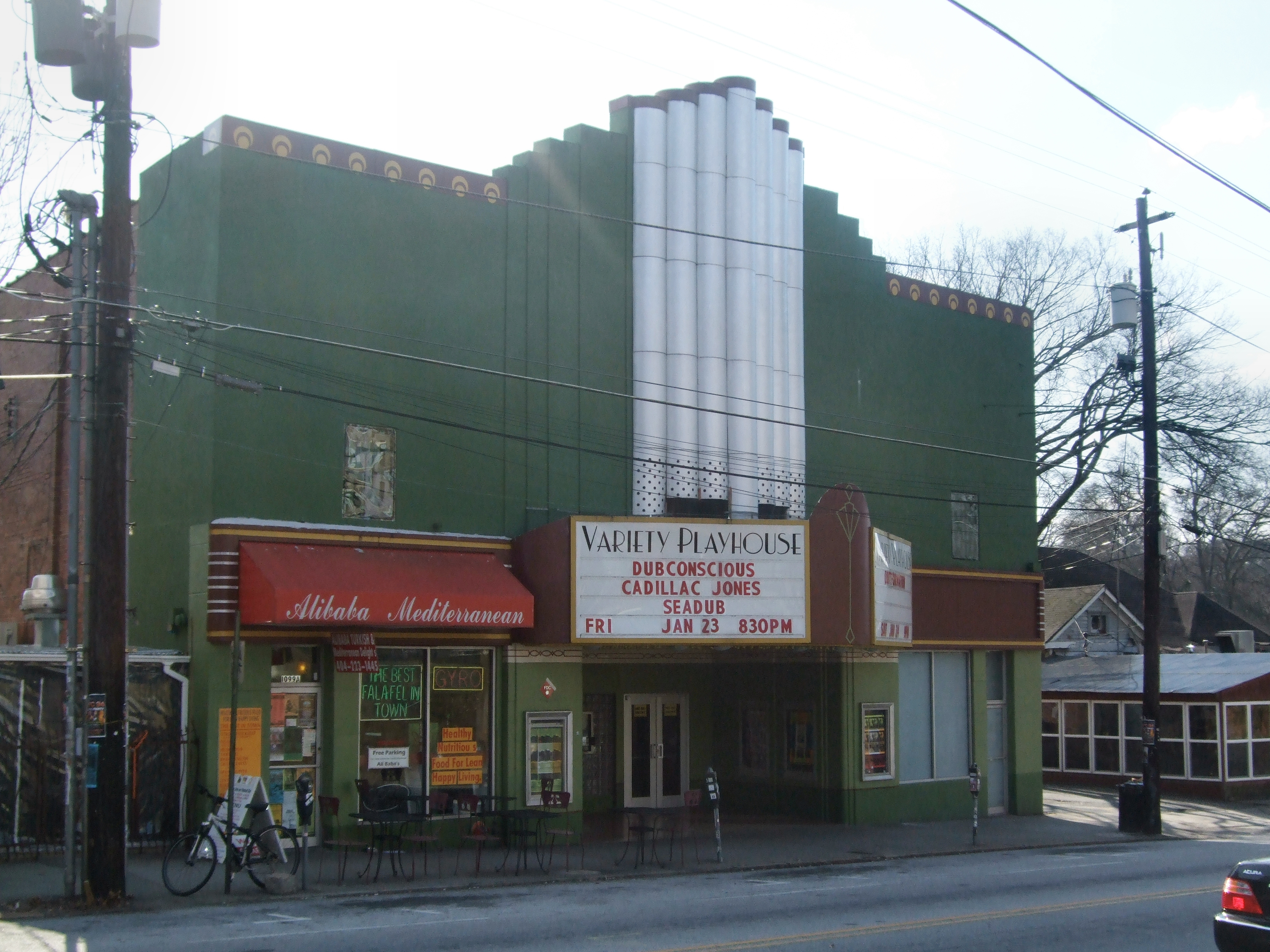
- Interactive map of Variety Playhouse
- Former names: Euclid Theatre (1940-62); Ellis Cinema (1984-88)
- Address: 1099 Euclid Ave NE; Atlanta, GA 30307-1923
- Location: Little Five Points
- Owner: Agon Sports and Entertainment
- Capacity: 1,000

Construction
- Opened: October 2, 1940

Website
- Venue Website

The Variety Playhouse (originally known as the Euclid Theatre) is a music venue in Atlanta, Georgia, United States. It is located on Euclid Avenue and features a variety of music acts including rock, indie, electronic, funk, country, folk, bluegrass, jazz, blues and world music as well as other live shows.

== History ==
The building was erected in 1940 and has been dedicated to different uses over the years, under different names.

=== 1940–1962 ===
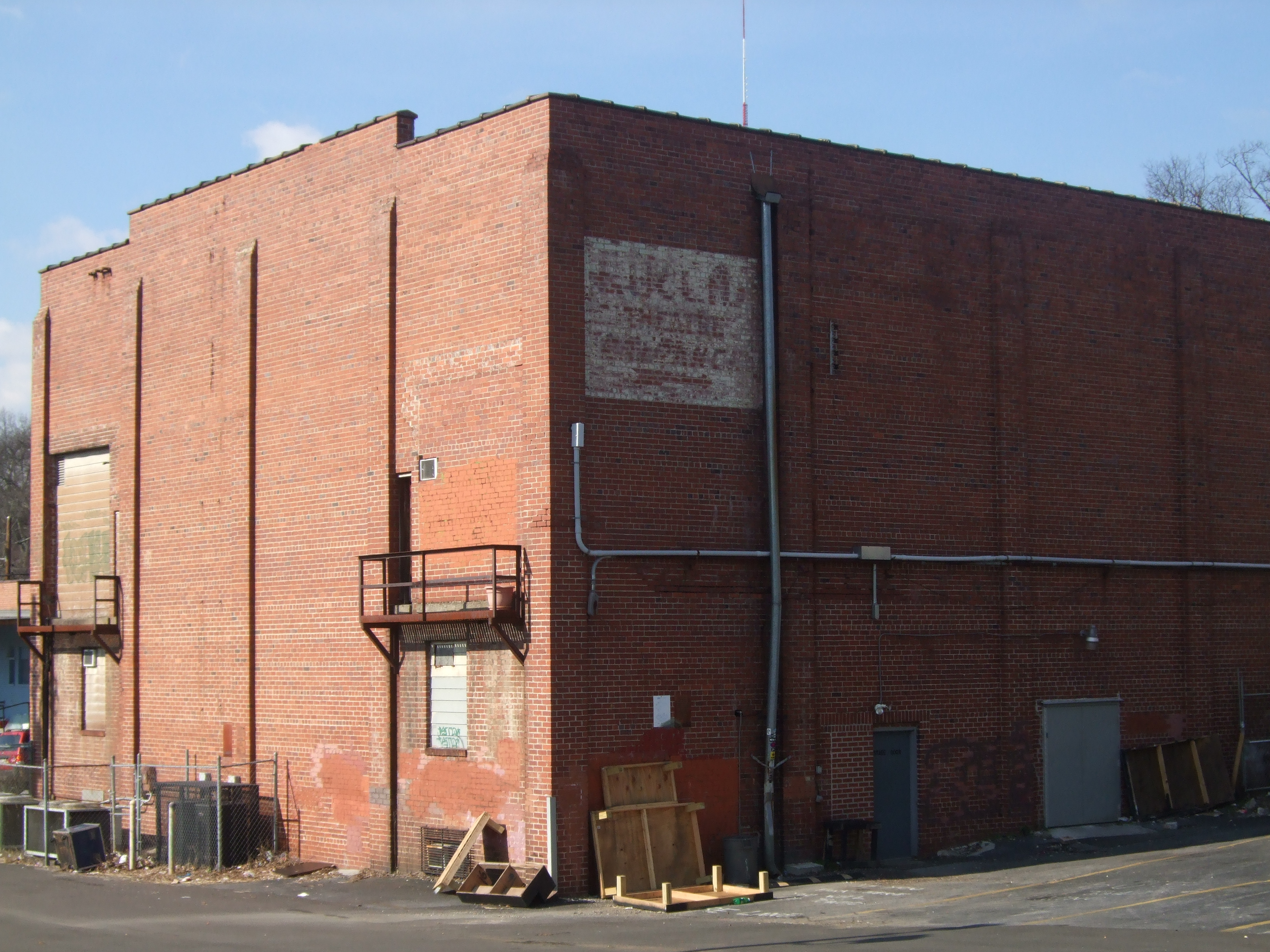
View from behind the building showing the "Euclid Theatre Entrance" sign

The theater was built as a cinema by Lucas and Jenkins Theatres, a company which operated other Georgia theaters at the time including the Fox in Atlanta. The Euclid was among three theaters built by L&J in Atlanta in 1940, another was the Gordon Theatre in the West End (now used as a church). The Euclid boasted a "staggered seating plan so no seat is directly behind another" and a neon marquee with "Euclid" in block letters. It opened at 2:15 P.M. Friday, October 4, 1940, and the first film exhibited was My Favorite Wife.

It continued as a first-run neighborhood cinema for the surrounding Candler Park and Inman Park neighborhoods for the next two decades. By 1962, the theater was running a mix of first-run and revival films. The last scheduled show seen in Atlanta Constitution listings consisted of the films Zotz! and Friendly Persuasion on July 30 and 31. Newspaper listings after this indicate the theater was "Closed for Repairs" for a few days, but it never reopened. The exact circumstances of the closing are not known.

A painted sign on the southeast corner of the building (above the stage door) which says "Euclid Theatre Entrance" was still visible as of 2009. See photo.

=== 1962–1983 ===
The building was not used as a cinema or theater for some two decades after the Euclid closed. At one point it was a warehouse for plumbing supplies (including some barrels of ammonia that required cleanup) and it was eventually slated for demolition. Atlanta mayor Maynard Jackson intervened resulting in the sale of the building to the Little Five Points Partnership, which was redeveloping the neighborhood in the early 1980s.

=== 1984–1988 ===
In 1982, Atlanta actor and art cinema operator George Ellis (known to many in the area as TV host Bestoink Dooley) was looking for another, larger theater location to exhibit films. His Film Forum locations in Ansley and Buckhead had been popular among Atlanta film buffs for years. After finding that the Little Five Points Partnership needed a tenant for the Euclid, Ellis recruited his friend Glenn Sirkis (a former Hayes Microcomputer Products executive) as an investor in the project. They started a renovation of the then 42-year-old building which would eventually cost $250,000. The goal was to reopen as "The Masterpiece Cinema", a duplex which would dedicate one screen to foreign-language films and the other to English-language films.

In June 1983 (in the middle of the renovation) George Ellis died suddenly at age 64. At the memorial service for Ellis, Glenn Sirkis announced that the renovation of the Euclid would continue, but at its planned opening in February 1984 it would be named the Ellis Cinema as a memorial. That date came and went as Sirkis and his wife Jill Kirn spent almost two years completing the renovation. The duplex idea was dropped. The exterior elements of the theater were retained, but the interior was "totally redesigned" with 310 seats, and a series of small mezzanines to accommodate tables and chairs along the outside walls. A small bar provided additional seating in the rear. A 50-foot-wide (15 m) screen was built, one of the largest in Atlanta at that time. The theater was designed to cater to an upscale audience with concessions such as amaretto chocolate truffles and a list of vintage wines. The total capacity at this time was 463.

A private opening ceremony was held on Thursday, October 4, 1984, exactly 44 years to the day from the original opening. The Ellis opened to the public on October 5, and the first film exhibited was The Ballad of Gregorio Cortez. A notable success of this period was the film Mass Appeal, which had not seen widespread U.S. distribution. A thank you note from Jack Lemmon for this was on display in the lobby. Other big successes of the Ellis era included Working Girls, Desert Hearts, Brazil and Personal Services. In addition to the first-run art films, the Ellis experimented with repertory cinema in February 1986 (starting with 1960 film Breathless) after the Rhodes Theater closed in December 1985.

The Ellis was highly regarded amongst the Atlanta cinemas of the time. It was named "The Nicest Theater in Atlanta" by Frank Thompson in Atlanta Magazine and WAGA (TV) gave it a Best of Atlanta award for "Best Theater Concessions."

Because the Ellis was a single screen, Sirkis and Kirn had trouble convincing movie distributors to rent films to them (as opposed to multi-screen operators in Atlanta such as George Lefont and the major chains). "It's the only business that as a buyer you have to convince your supplier to sell to you," said Jill Kirn in a news article when the Ellis closed in 1988. "We just aren't big enough fish," she added.

The Ellis closed on Monday, August 8, 1988, with no advance notice. In the next year a group called The George Ellis Film Society was formed with the goal of reopening the theater, but that effort was ultimately unsuccessful. (The Society proceeded to have film festivals and other events in Ellis' honor for a few years).

=== 1989–1990 ===
In 1989 Paul Blane, a 62-year-old talent manager and producer from Valdosta, Georgia, moved to Atlanta to dedicate the theater to live performances, particularly featuring classic motion picture stars. He had produced and directed a revue called "Great Stars of the Silver Screen" (starring Dorothy Lamour, Yvonne De Carlo, Jane Russell and others) which toured the country from 1981 to 1987, and he intended to produce similar shows in a permanent venue. He renamed the theater The Variety Playhouse and reportedly spent $100,000 renovating the building. This included building a 40 feet (12 m) wide by 29 feet (8.8 m) deep stage and installing some 500 "very plush" new seats.

The first show was "La Cage Follies" beginning on June 23, 1989, and which featured celebrity impersonators. Other shows during this era included Decatur's Beacon Dance Company and the National Black Arts Festival. Musical performers were also featured during this era, such as The Blue Nile, The Dirty Dozen Brass Band, Muzsikás, Odetta and Leon Redbone. This incarnation of the theater only lasted about one year.

=== 1990–2015 ===
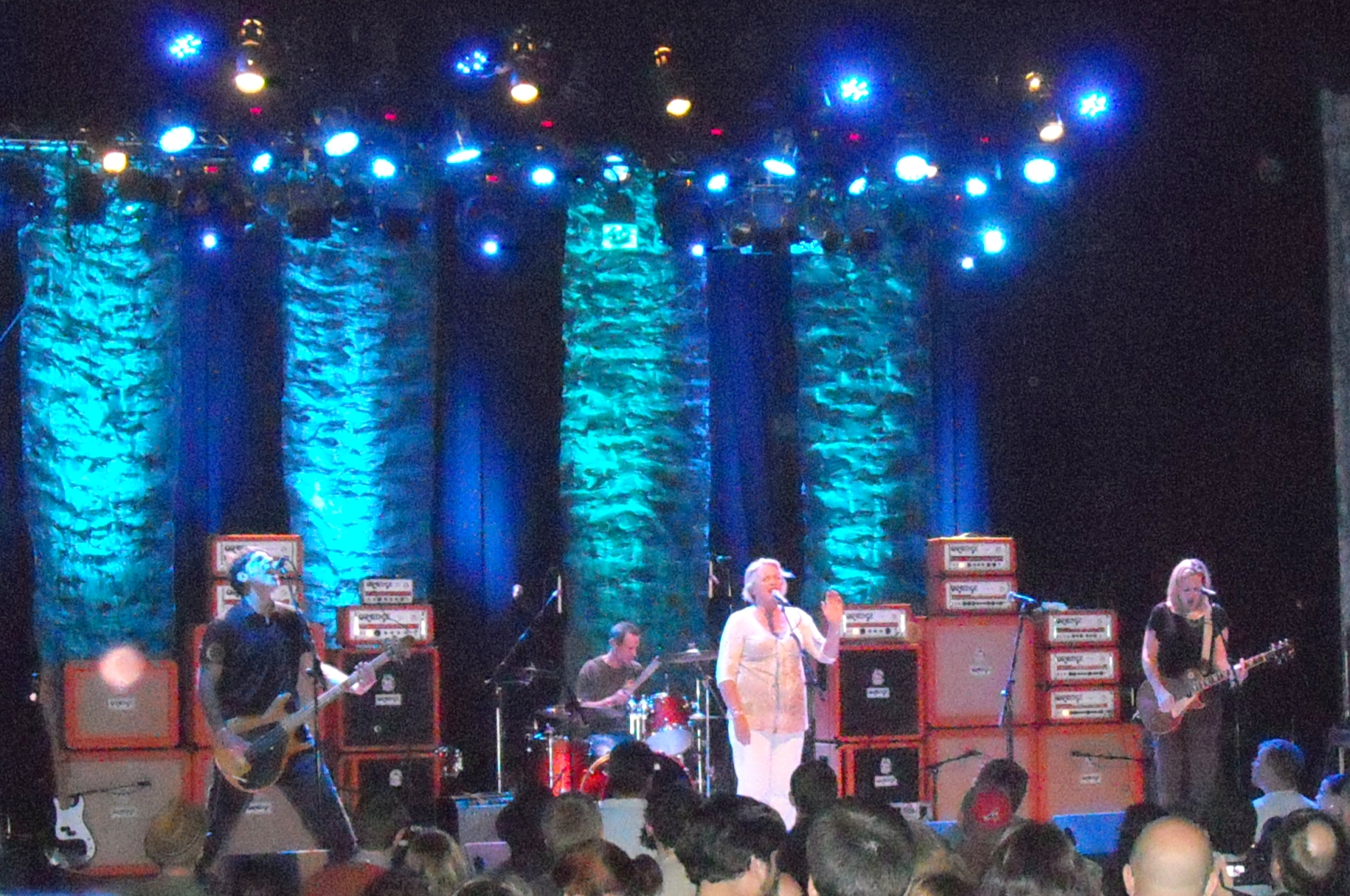
The Variety Playhouse continues its operations today—here, Atlanta-based Magnapop is shown playing a benefit concert for local record store Criminal Records in 2011

Blane's goal of live performances was not totally successful, and the theater had relied more and more on music acts to fill the schedule. Ultimately, on Monday, August 20, 1990, the management of the theater was assumed by Steven Harris of Windstorm Productions, a 30-year-old Atlanta-area concert promoter. He told the Atlanta Constitution that he planned to make the Variety into "a place where you can see a top-rated concert but in a very intimate setting." The theater was briefly closed for some renovations, and reopened on September 7, 1990, with The Count Basie Orchestra as the first show, followed by Tom Rush the next day.

=== 2015–Present ===
In October 2015, Variety Playhouse was purchased by Agon, the owner of Georgia Theatre in Athens, Georgia. In Summer 2016, venue operations were shut down for a full-scale renovation. During this time, many improvements were made to the room, including a lowered front pit area, new downstairs bathrooms, new fixed seating on the main level, larger and improved bar areas, and a completely rebuilt balcony. The venue reopened on September 28, 2016, with a show by ambient musician Tycho.

== Architecture ==
The building is a World War II-era movie theater with some art deco or art moderne elements that has been converted for use as a music venue. It is of brick construction and sits on 0.86 acres (3,500 m^{2}) with a parking area behind it.

Like most cinemas of the era, it has a sloping floor in the main seating area with a balcony above. The area in front of the stage is lowered and open for dancing and standing-room for general admission shows. (Chairs are sometimes set up here for certain shows). The main seating area has theater-style seats, with an aisle on either side. Outside the two aisles are a series of tiered mezzanines that allow for tables and chairs.

The bars in the lobby and on the balcony serve a variety of domestic and imported beers, liquor, wine and typical theater snacks.

== Artists ==
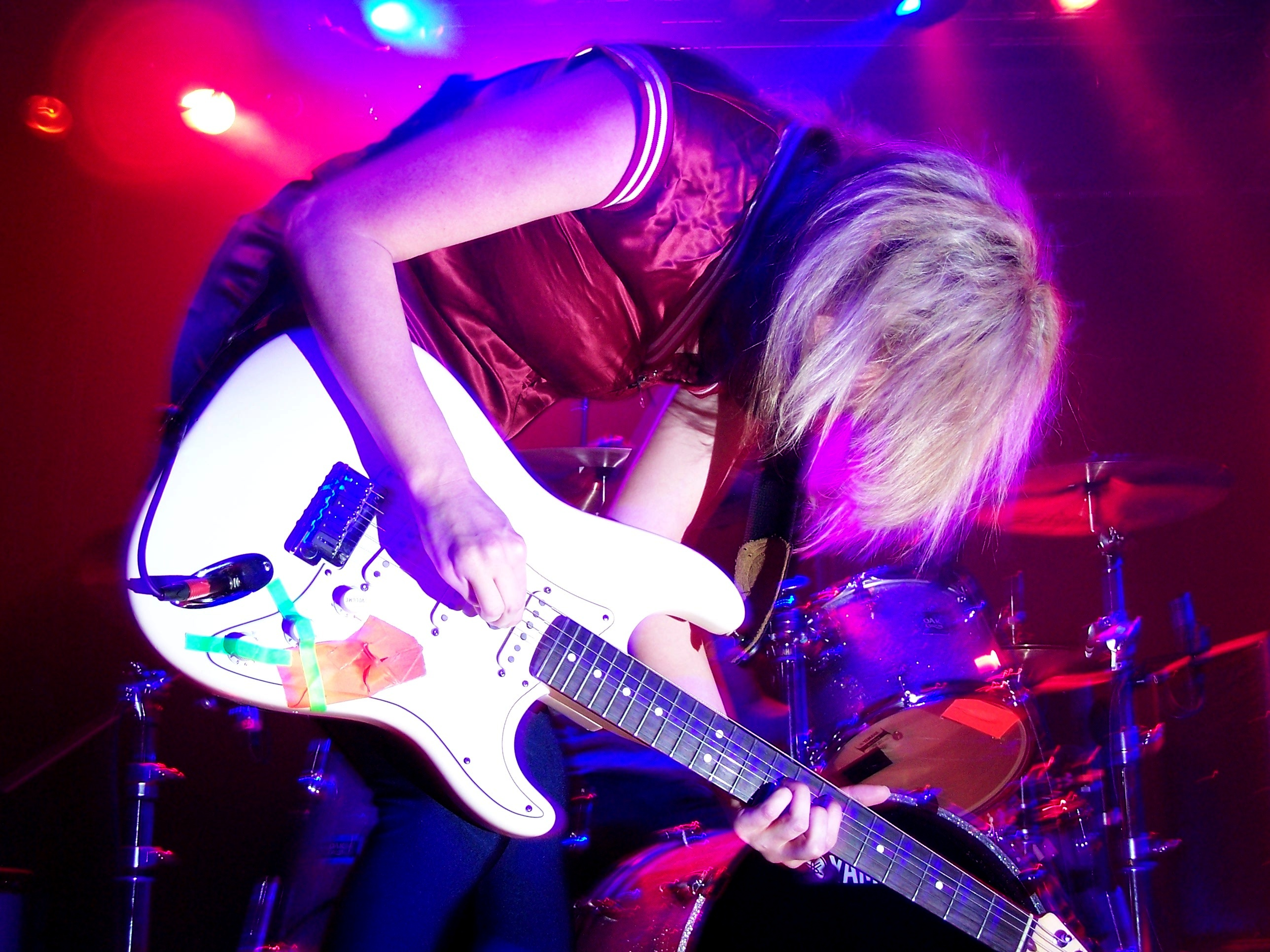
Katie White of The Ting Tings performs at the theatre on October 23, 2008

As suggested by the name of the venue, a wide variety of artists have performed here in the two decades it has been used mainly as a music venue. These have included Adele, Augustana, Natasha Bedingfield, Basia, The BoDeans, Built to Spill, The Bridges, Colbie Caillat, Jeff Mangum, Ray Davies, Dawes, Dead Confederate, The Detroit Cobras, The Dresden Dolls, Donna the Buffalo, Lucky Dube, Jakob Dylan, Tinsley Ellis, Alejandro Escovedo, The Faint, Brooke Fraser, Galactic, Ghostface Killah, Gnarls Barkley, Godspeed You! Black Emperor, Gogol Bordello, José González, The Greyboy Allstars, David Grisman, Hampton Grease Band, The Hold Steady, Tim & Eric, Hot Tuna, Israel Vibration, Daniel Johnston, The Kooks, Modest Mouse, Ben Kweller, Locksley, Gary Louris, Shelby Lynne, Magnapop, Stephen Malkmus and the Jicks, Meat Puppets, Minus the Bear, Moonalice, Kate Nash, Gabby La La, Colonel Claypool's Bucket of Bernie Brains, The New Pornographers, 1990s, of Montreal, Old 97's, Amy Ray, Overkill, Nile, HammerFall, Michael Schenker Fest, Rilo Kiley, Carrie Rodriguez, Rooney, Ike Stubblefield, The Swell Season, Matthew Sweet, Particle, The Ting Tings, Toots & the Maytals, Pnuma Trio, The Undertow Orchestra, Vetiver, The Whigs, Wolf Parade, X, Dan Zanes and Friends and Zap Mama

=== Albums and live recordings ===
The building boasts good acoustics and a well-equipped sound system, leading several artists to record live albums here. These have included Sara Bareilles, Blueground Undergrass, Lea DeLaria, Jay Farrar, Dominic Gaudious, Shawn Mullins, Phish, Soulive, They Might Be Giants and Butch Walker.

In addition, because the current management allows recording when the artists permit it a number of other legal live recordings are available from this venue. These include such artists as Ryan Adams, Animal Collective, Aquarium Rescue Unit, Benevento/Russo Duo, Blues Traveler, Buckethead, The John Butler Trio, Camper Van Beethoven, Carbon Leaf, The Codetalkers, Cowboy Junkies, Cracker, Dark Star Orchestra, Dinosaur Jr, JJ Grey & MOFRO, Howie Day, Karl Denson's Tiny Universe, Disco Biscuits, Drive-By Truckers, Eddie from Ohio, Explosions in the Sky, Robert Fripp, The Grapes, Indecision, Jacob Fred Jazz Odyssey, Jump, Little Children, Steve Kimock, Leftover Salmon, Little Feat, Matisyahu, moe., Jason Mraz, Matt Nathanson, North Mississippi Allstars, OFF!, Perpetual Groove, Quasi, Railroad Earth, Scrapomatic, Martin Sexton, Elliott Smith, Sound Tribe Sector 9, The String Cheese Incident, Sun Ra, Tea Leaf Green, The Derek Trucks Band, Umphrey's McGee and Yonder Mountain String Band.

== Awards ==
In its current incarnation as a music venue, it has won numerous "Best of Atlanta" awards over the years.

=== Creative Loafing Best of Atlanta ===
- 1997 Best Concert Venue & Best Place to Hear Acoustic Music (Critic's Choice)
- 1998 Best Rock Club
- 1999 Best Concert Venue
- 2000 Best Concert Venue (Critics Choice)
- 2001 Best Concert Venue
- 2002 Best Concert Venue
- 2003 Best Concert Venue
- 2004 Best Concert Venue
- 2005 Best Concert Venue
- 2006 Best Concert Venue
- 2007 Best Concert Venue
- 2008 Best Concert Venue
- 2009 Best Concert Venue (Readers Pick)

=== Other awards ===
- Southern Voice Best of Gay Atlanta: 2004 Best Live Music Venue (Editor's Choice)
- The Technique Best of Tech: 2005 Best Concert Venue
- INsite Magazine Best of Atlanta: 2006 Best Music Venue - Indoor
- Access Atlanta Best of the Big A: 2007 Best Concert Venue (TIE)
- Atlanta Magazine Best of Atlanta: 2007 Best Live Music Experience
- The Sunday Paper Reader's Choice: 2007 Best Concert Venue
- Access Atlanta Best of the Big A: 2008 Best Small Music Venue
- INsite Magazine Best of Atlanta: 2008 Best Music Venue - Indoor

== In culture ==
Turner Classic Movies uses footage of the marquee of Variety Playhouse in its TCM Classic Movie News segments.
