= Bruce Hampton =

American musician (1947–2017)

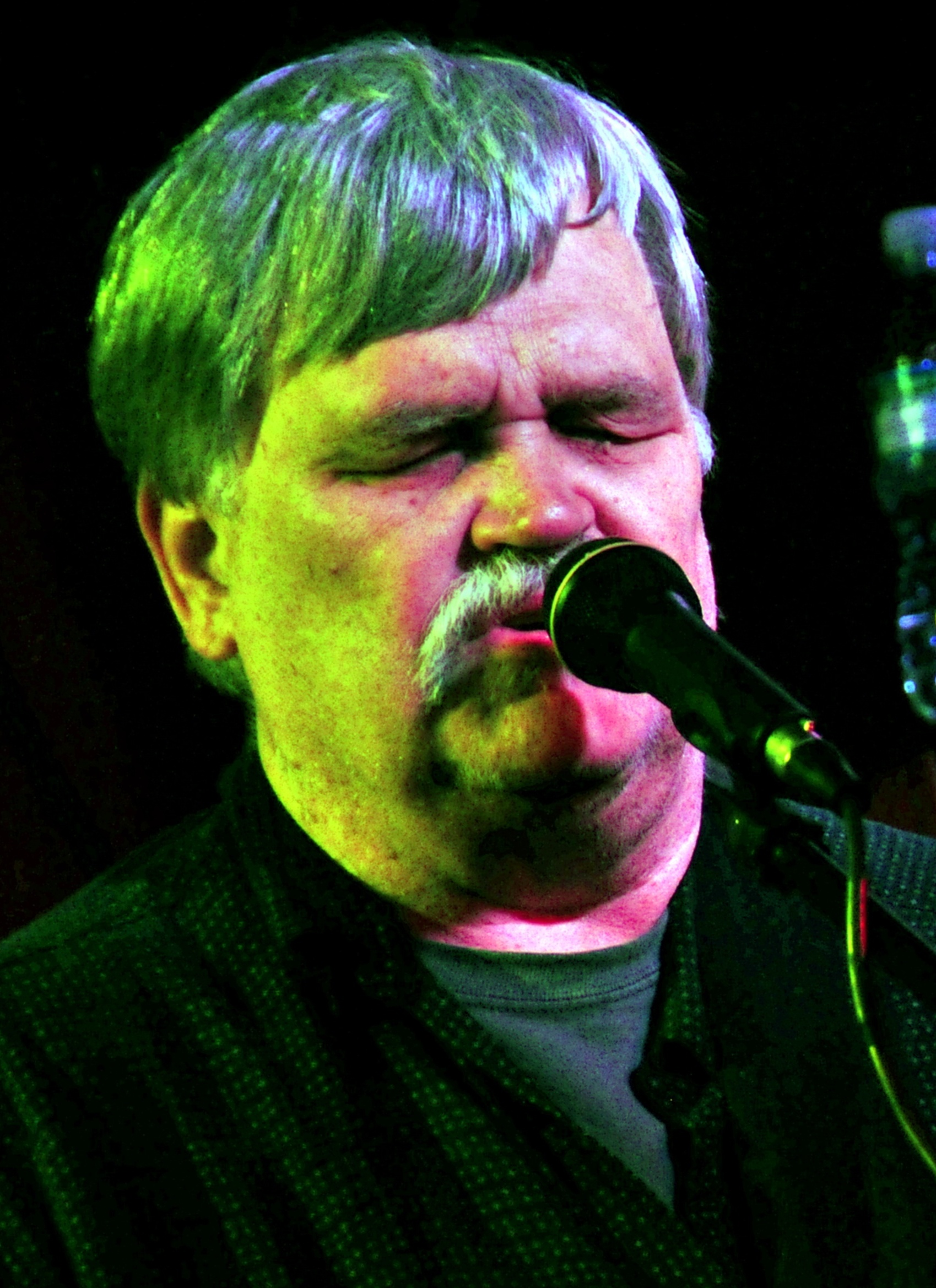
- Hampton performing at the Lantern in Blacksburg, Virginia, August 2008

Background information
- Born: Gustav Valentine Berglund III; April 30, 1947; Knoxville, Tennessee, U.S.
- Died: May 1, 2017 (aged 70) Atlanta, Georgia, U.S.
- Genres: Rock; jazz fusion; progressive rock; Southern rock; experimental rock; psychedelic rock; folk; Americana; jam
- Occupations: Musician, actor
- Instruments: Guitar; vocals
- Years active: 1960–2017
- Labels: Brato Ganibe; Capricorn Records; Columbia Records
- Formerly of: Hampton Grease Band; Late Bronze Age; New Ice Age; Aquarium Rescue Unit; The Stained Souls; The Fiji Mariners; The Quark Alliance; The Codetalkers; The Pharaoh Gummitt; The Madrid Express
- Website: colbruce.com

Bruce Hampton (born Gustav Valentine Berglund III; April 30, 1947 – May 1, 2017) was an American musician. He was a key figure in the Atlanta music scene, mentoring numerous other musicians who became national stars. His own musical style was avant-garde, combining elements of jazz, fusion, southern rock, and jam band styles.

He first rose to prominence as the leader of the Hampton Grease Band. Adopting the moniker Colonel Hampton B. Coles, Retired or alternatively Col. Bruce Hampton Ret., and sometimes playing a small custom-made electric guitar/mandolin hybrid he called a "chazoid", he later formed several other bands, some of whose names include The Late Bronze Age, The Aquarium Rescue Unit, The Fiji Mariners, The Codetalkers, The Quark Alliance, Pharaoh Gummitt, and Madrid Express.

== Career ==
As a member of the Hampton Grease Band, Bruce Hampton helped record the 1971 album Music to Eat. According to legend, this was the second-worst-selling album in Columbia Records history, with the worst being a yoga record. Hampton's band The Late Bronze Age consisted of "Col. Hampton B. Coles, Ret." (Bruce Hampton) on vocals, slide guitar, mandolin, and chazoid; Ben "Pops" Thornton (Billy McPherson) on vocals, guitar, saxophones, and keyboards; Lincoln Metcalfe (Ricky Keller) on bass, guitar, brass, and vocals; and Bubba Phreon (Jerry Fields) on drums, percussion, trombone, and vocals. They performed several songs in Getting It On, a 1983 film.

Hampton helped start the 1990s seminal H.O.R.D.E. tours. The best known of his bands to play H.O.R.D.E. is the jazz-rock outfit Aquarium Rescue Unit, which featured improvisational music all-stars Oteil Burbridge, Jimmy Herring, Rev. Jeff Mosier, Matt Mundy, and Jeff Sipe. In 1994, Hampton formed the progressive rock/jazz duo Fiji Mariners and recorded two albums on Capricorn Records with Dan Matrazzo who simultaneously played keys, drums, and bass. Later, Ricky Fargo, Marcus Williams joined on drums and Joseph Patrick Moore joined on bass.

Hampton was the voice of Warren, a talking potted shrub, in a 1998 episode ("Warren") of Space Ghost Coast to Coast on Cartoon Network. Hampton played Morris, the songwriting band manager in the1996 film, Sling Blade (Billy Bob Thornton starred in the movie). Hampton also portrayed a guitar 'out'structor in Mike Gordon's Outside Out (2000).

Longtime friend Susan Tedeschi wrote a song about Bruce called "Hampmotized." It appears on her 2002 release Wait For Me. Hampton returned the favor with the song "Susan T". Basically Frightened: The Musical Madness of Col. Bruce Hampton, Ret. is a documentary about Hampton. It premiered at the Atlanta Film Festival in March 2012. Georgia governor Nathan Deal presented Hampton with the Governor's Award In The Arts and Humanities in 2012. In 2014, Hampton made a cameo in the music video for rap group Run The Jewels' single "Blockbuster Night, Pt. 1".

In Here Comes Rusty (2015), Hampton portrayed the lead character, Dicky, alongside co-stars Fred Willard, Joey Lauren Adams, and Brandon Niederauer. The film debuted at the Atlanta Film Festival in 2016, but was not commercially available until 2020.

== 70th birthday concert and death ==
On May 1, 2017, Hampton was honored by his friends at the Fox Theatre in Atlanta for his 70th birthday. Dubbed Hampton 70: A Celebration of Col. Bruce Hampton, it was an all-star concert featuring Widespread Panic members John Bell, Dave Schools, Duane Trucks, and Jimmy Herring; blues guitarist Tinsley Ellis, Peter Buck of R.E.M, steel guitarist Darick Campbell, saxophone player Karl Denson, Drew Emmitt and Vince Herman of Leftover Salmon, Jon Fishman of Phish, banjo player Rev. Jeff Mosier of Blueground Undergrass, guitarist Warren Haynes, Drivin N Cryin frontman Kevn Kinney, Atlanta jazz-staple Johnny Knapp, Chuck Leavell; Athens rock-troubadour T. Hardy Morris, 13-year-old guitar prodigy Brandon Niederauer, slide guitarist Derek Trucks and blues singer Susan Tedeschi of the Tedeschi Trucks Band, John Popper of Blues Traveler, funk bassist Kevin Scott, keyboardist Matt Slocum, Denny Walley of Frank Zappa fame, gypsy-metal guitarist Emil Werstler, Oliver Wood of The Wood Brothers, and MLB pitcher Jake Peavy. Billy Bob Thornton was scheduled to appear but did not attend. The event was produced by Good Times Productions with the proceeds benefiting the Fox Theatre Institute and other musician-focused charities.

During the encore performance of the show, Hampton suffered a massive heart attack and collapsed on stage. Onlookers and his fellow musicians initially either did not notice that Hampton had collapsed, or thought it was a ruse due to his history of falling down onstage during performances and other practical jokes. As a result, Hampton lay face down at Niederauer's feet, his left arm draped over a stage monitor, as Niederauer soloed on "Turn on Your Love Light". The band played for several minutes before Hampton was taken offstage; he died shortly thereafter at Emory University Hospital Midtown in Atlanta.

== Discography ==
=== Main releases ===
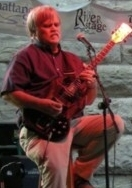
Hampton at the 2007 Riverbend Festival in Chattanooga, Tennessee

- 1971 – Music to Eat – Hampton Grease Band (Columbia Records)
- 1978 – One Ruined Life of a Bronze Tourist – Col. Bruce Hampton (Pine Tree Records)
- 1980 – Outside Looking Out – Col. Bruce Hampton and the Late Bronze Age (Landslide Records)
- 1982 – Isles of Langerhan – Col. Bruce Hampton and the Late Bronze Age (Landslide)
- 1987 – Arkansas – Col. Bruce Hampton (Landslide Records)
- 1992 – Col. Bruce Hampton & the Aquarium Rescue Unit – Col. Bruce Hampton and the Aquarium Rescue Unit (Capricorn Records)
- 1993 – Mirrors of Embarrassment – Col. Bruce Hampton and the Aquarium Rescue Unit (Capricorn)
- 1994 – Strange Voices: A History 1977–1987 – Col. Bruce Hampton (Landslide)
- 1996 – Fiji Mariners – Fiji Mariners featuring Col. Bruce Hampton (Capricorn)
- 1998 – Live – Fiji Mariners featuring Col. Bruce Hampton (Capricorn)
- 2000 – Bootleg Live! – The Codetalkers featuring Col. Bruce Hampton
- 2004 – Deluxe Edition – The Codetalkers featuring Col. Bruce Hampton (re-released in 2005 as Dee-lux Uh-dish-un)
- 2006 – Now – The Codetalkers
- 2007 – Give Thanks to Chank – Col. Bruce & The Quark Alliance (Brato Ganibe Records)
- 2008 – Songs of the Solar Ping – Col. Bruce Hampton, Ret. (Brato Ganibe Records)
- 2014 – Pharaoh's Kitchen – Col. Bruce Hampton, Ret. (Ropeadope Records)
- 2017 – Live at the Vista Room – Col. Bruce Hampton and The Madrid Express (Ropeadope)

=== With various artists ===
- 1994 – The Best of Mountain Stage Live, Vol. 6 (Blue Plate Music)
- 1997 – Mucho Mojo: Best of Fat Possum (Capricorn)
- 2000 – Wintertime Blues: The Benefit Concert (Evil Teen Records)
- 2003 – Bonnaroo, Vol. 2 (Sanctuary Records)
- 2007 – The Benefit Concert, Volume 2 (Evil Teen)

=== As a guest musician ===
- 1967 – We're Only In It For The Money – Frank Zappa (Verve Records)
- 1968 – Lumpy Gravy – Frank Zappa (briefly released under Capitol Records)
- 1979 – Skin Deep – Yeah – David Earle Johnson (David Earle Johnson Records)
- 1981 – Route Two – David Earle Johnson (Landslide Records)
- 1995 – The Best of CeDell Davis – CeDell Davis (Fat Possum Records)
- 2000 – The Flower & the Knife – Kevn Kinney (Capricorn)
- 2001 – Project Z – Project Z (Terminus Records)
- 2002 – Wait for me – Susan Tedeschi (Tone Cool Records)
- 2002 – Uninvisible – Medeski Martin & Wood (Blue Note Records)
- 2002 – Live in the Classic City – Widespread Panic (Sanctuary)
- 2003 – Inside In – Mike Gordon (Ropeadope Records)
- 2006 – Faces – Blueground Undergrass (Landslide)
- 2009 - Sold Out - Big Shanty (King Mojo Records)
- 2012 – Back To The Woods: A Tribute To The Pioneers Of Blues Piano – Chuck Leavell (Evergreen Arts / Red)
- 2012 – Wood – Widespread Panic (Widespread Records)
- 2015 – Soul Brother Where Art Thou? - Greg Hester (Ropeadope)

== Acting credits ==
- Tombstone, 1993, bar patron (uncredited)
- Sling Blade, 1996, Morris
- Space Ghost Coast to Coast, 1998, TV series, 1 episode, Warren
- Outside Out, 2001, Hampton
- Duckworth, 2011, TV short, snake charmer
- Here Comes Rusty, 2016, Dicky St. Jon
- Gilda Sue Rosenstern: The Motion Picture!, 2018, Mr. Lives in His Van, final role
