= Grant Green Jr. =

American jazz musician

Gregory Green, known professionally as Grant Green Jr., is a jazz guitarist and the eldest son of jazz guitarist Grant Green. He is a member of the group Masters of Groove with Bernard Purdie and Reuben Wilson. Born in St. Louis, Missouri on August 4, 1955, Green Jr. began playing guitar at the age of fourteen. In 1969, he moved to Detroit with his father, who died ten years later. His neighbors were Stevie Wonder's parents. He has worked with Richard "Groove" Holmes, Leon Thomas, Jimmy McGriff, Lou Donaldson, and Lonnie Smith.

== Discography ==
=== As leader ===
- Back to the Groove (Paddle Wheel, 1997)
- Jungle Strut (Venus, 1997 [1998])
- Introducing G.G. (Jazzateria, 2002)
- Thank You Mr. Bacharach (ZMI Records, 2022)
- Thank You Mr. Bacharach Vol 1 and 2 (ZMI Records, 2023)

With Bernard Purdie and Reuben Wilson

- The Masters of Groove - Meet Dr. No (Jazzateria, 2001)
- The Masters of Groove - Meet DJ-9 (Jazzateria, 2006)
- The Godfathers of Groove (18th & Vine, 2007) [note: originally released as The Masters of Groove]
- The Godfathers of Groove 3 (18th & Vine, 2009)

=== As sideman ===
With Reuben Wilson

- Organ Blues (Jazzateria, 2002)
- Movin' On (Savant, 2006)
