= Hampton Grease Band =

American rock band

The Hampton Grease Band was an American rock band, beginning as a blues rock group in the late 1960s in Atlanta, Georgia. They performed with several major bands in this period, including Grateful Dead and the Allman Brothers. The band gained a reputation for wacky stage antics, and eventually garnered enough attention to sign to Columbia Records. They recorded the double album Music to Eat (June 1971), which is apocryphally said to have been the second-lowest selling album in Columbia's history, second only to a yoga instructional record. This record has been compared to Captain Beefheart, Frank Zappa & The Mothers of Invention, and Pere Ubu.

The band then signed to Frank Zappa's Bizarre and Straight labels, but broke up in 1973. Several of the members went on to more renowned music careers, including Glenn Phillips' solo work and Bruce Hampton's work with the Aquarium Rescue Unit. Harold Kelling formed The Starving Braineaters and continued playing with several bands in the Atlanta area. Sam Whiteside was also the road manager. Sam Whiteside and Espy Geisler designed the cover art and most of the artwork on the inside of their album Music to Eat. Music to Eat gained a significant cult following, and was re-released on CD in 1996 with several minutes of additional material that had been edited from the vinyl release.

The band was the lead-off band for Frank Zappa/Mothers last appearance at the Fillmore East on June 6, 1971. It was at this concert that Zappa and the Mothers recorded part of Live at the Fillmore East. Later that evening, they were joined by John Lennon and Yoko Ono, also available in recorded versions.

Lead guitarist Harold Kelling died in May 2005.

The Hampton Grease Band held their first reunion concert on June 2, 2006, at the Variety Playhouse in Little Five Points, a commercial area in Atlanta, Georgia. They played the Music to Eat and played some covers in their two encores, including "Rock Around the Clock".

== Band members ==
- Jerry Fields (aka. Bubba Phreon) - trombone, drums, percussion, vocals
- Bruce Hampton (aka. Col. Hampton B. Coles, Ret.) - vocals, trumpet
- Mike Holbrook - bass
- Harold Kelling - composer, cover design, guitar, vocals
- Glenn Phillips - guitar, saxophone
