= Abstract Logix =

American record label

- Founded: 2003
- Founder: Souvik Dutta
- Genre: Jazz fusion, World music, Jam band
- Country of origin: United States
- Location: Cary, North Carolina
- Official website: www.abstractlogix.com

Abstract Logix is an American record label, based in Cary, North Carolina, which specializes in jazz fusion, world and jam band music. As of mid 2023, Abstract Logix has released 70 titles from musicians spanning the globe. In 2019 they were voted "Best Record Label" in the JazzTimes Magazine Readers' Poll.

== History ==
The company began as a music blog started by music enthusiast and computer programmer Souvik Dutta in 2002. The blog began by making available a recording of a house concert featuring Shawn Lane, Jonas Hellborg, and Jeff Sipe that took place on April 29, 2002. The single-page website and the record label it eventually birthed was named after the 1995 CD Abstract Logic (album) by Lane, Hellborg, and drummer Kofi Baker. "I always loved that name," Dutta told DownBeat in fall of 2025. "Abstraction is a really interest ing concept in engineering that deals with break ing down the whole idea into smaller ideas. And I turned the ‘c’ in logic into an ‘x’, because ‘x’ goes with extreme programming, which I used to do at the time."

From there, Dutta branched out into direct sales and merchandising, becoming the exclusive retailer for a 3-DVD set by fusion guitarist John McLaughlin entitled This Is the Way I Do It and handling merchandising for McLaughlin's tours, while continuing to write code for IBM.

Abstract Logix's first two releases were Lincoln Memorial by Project Z (featuring Jimmy Herring, Greg Osby, Ricky Keller, and Jeff Sipe) in 2005 and Alex Machacek's [Sic] in 2006. Dutta's relationship with McLaughlin resulted in the guitarist's Floating Point being released on the label in 2008. In 2010, Dutta described Abstract Logix's roster as "musical pioneers and visionaries, old and young. Our clients include Grammy winners and musical icons like John McLaughlin, as well as young and upcoming icons of tomorrow like Alex Machacek, Jimmy Herring, and Wayne Krantz, among others."

Other notable musicians to record for Abstract Logix include Lenny White, Gary Husband, Anthony Jackson, Scott Kinsey, and Ranjit Barot. The Abstract Logix website also sells independent releases by a number of other fusion, world, and progressive artists. Speaking to The Telegraph, Dutta reflected, "We are fortunate to work with innovative musicians who are on the cutting edge and always evolving".

The label's first Grammy Award-winning release was McLaughlin's Live @ Ronnie Scott's, which received the 2017 Grammy Award for Best Improvised Jazz Solo for McLaughlin's performance on the track "Miles Beyond". In February 2024, Abstract Logix received their second Grammy for the album This Moment by Shakti, which won the Grammy Award for Best Global Music Album. Shakti and Abstract Logix were again recognized by The Recording Academy in November of 2025, when their 2025 album Mind Explosion (50th Anniversary Tour Live) was nominated for Best Global Music Album and the album's song "Shrini's Dream" was nominated for the Grammy Award for Best Global Music Performance.

== Discography ==
Catalog number	Artist	Title	Year
ABLX-001	Project Z	Lincoln Memorial	2005
ABLX-002	Alex Machacek	[Sic]	2006
ABLX-003	Scott Kinsey	Kinesthetics	2006
ABLX-004	Slaughterhouse 3	S3	2006
ABLX-005	Jeff Babko	Mondo Trio	2007
ABLX-006	Gary Willis	Actual Fiction	2007
ABLX-007	Alex Machacek, Jeff Sipe, Matthew Garrison	Improvision	2007
ABLX-009	Paul Hanson	Frolic in the Land of Plenty	2008
ABLX-010	Tony Grey	Chasing Shadows	2008
ABLX-011	John McLaughlin	Floating Point	2008
ABLX-012	John McLaughlin	Meeting of the Minds: The Making of Floating Point DVD	2008
ABLX-013	Jimmy Herring	Lifeboat	2008
ABLX-014	Alex Machacek / Jeff Sipe / Neal Fountain	The Official Triangle Sessions	2008
ABLX-015	Gary Husband’s Drive	Hotwired	2008
ABLX-016	John McLaughlin and the 4th Dimension	Live @ Belgrade	2009
ABLX-017	Sebastiaan Cornelissen	U-Turn	2009
ABLX-018	Wayne Krantz	Krantz Carlock Lefebvre	2009
ABLX-019	Ranjit Barot	BAda Boom	2008
ABLX-020	Anthony Jackson and Yiorgos Fakanas	Interspirit	2010
ABLX-022	Lenny White	Anomaly	2010
ABLX-025	Prasanna	Raga Bop Trio	2010
ABLX-026	John McLaughlin and the 4th Dimension	To the One	2010
ABLX-027	Gary Husband	Dirty & Beautiful Volume 1	2010
ABLX-028	Human Element	Human Element	2010
ABLX-024	Alex Machacek and Marco Minnemann	24 Tales	2010
ABLX-030	Various Artists	Abstract Logix Live! The New Universe Music Festival 2010 CD	2008
ABLX-031	Various Artists	Abstract Logix Live! The New Universe Music Festival 2010 DVD	2008
ABLX-032	Oz Noy	Twisted Blues Volume 1	2011
ABLX-033	Gary Husband	Dirty & Beautiful Volume 2	2012
ABLX-034	Wayne Krantz	Howie 61	2012
ABLX-035	Jimmy Herring	Subject to Change Without Notice	2012
ABLX-036	Alex Machacek, Raphael Preuschi, Herbert Pirker	Fat	2012
ABLX-037	John McLaughlin and the 4th Dimension	Now Here This	2012
ABLX-038	Gary Willis	Retro	2013
ABLX-040	Tony Grey	Elevation	2013
ABLX-041	Gary Husband and Alex Machacek	Now	2013
ABLX-042	John McLaughlin and the 4th Dimension	The Boston Record	2014
ABLX-043	Oz Noy	Twisted Blues Volume 2	2014
ABLX-044	Chingari	Bombay Makossa	2014
ABLX-045	Jeff Sipe, Mike Seal, and Taylor Lee	Jeff Sipe Trio	2014
ABLX-046	Gary Husband	Dirty and Beautiful Volume 1 - Special Remix Edition	2014
ABLX-047	Wayne Krantz	Good Piranha / Bad Piranha	2014
ABLX-048	Oz Noy, Dave Weckl, Etienne M’Bappe	Asian Twist	2015
ABLX-049	Gary Willis	Larger Than Life	2015
ABLX-050	John McLaughlin	Black Light	2015
ABLX-053	Scott Kinsey	Near Life Experience	2016
ABLX-055	Etienne M’Bappe and the Prophets	How Near How Far	2016
ABLX-056	King Baby	The Big Galoot	2017
ABLX-057	Oz Noy	Ozone Squeeze	2017
ABLX-058	John McLaughlin and the 4th Dimension	Live @ Ronnie Scotts	2017
ABLX-059	John McLaughlin and the 4th Dimension / Jimmy Herring and the Invisible Whip	Live in San Francisco	2018
ABLX-060	Oz Noy	Booga Looga Loo	2019
ABLX-061	John McLaughlin, Shankar Mahadevan, Zakir Hussain	Is That So?	2020
ABLX-062	Wayne Krantz	Write out Your Head	2020
ABLX-063	Oz Noy	Snapdragon	2020
ABLX-064	Wayne Krantz	Music Room 1985	2021
ABLX-065	John McLaughlin	Liberation Time	2021
ABLX-066	The Trackers featuring Gary Husband and Alf Terje Hana	Vaudeville 8:45	2022
ABLX-067	Debashish Bhattacharya	The Sound of the Soul	2023
ABLX-068	Shakti	This Moment	2023
ABLX-069	Ozone Squeeze (Oz Noy, Rai Thistlethwayte, Sara Niemietz, and Darren Stanley)	Squeeze It	2023
ABLX-070	Oz Noy featuring Dennis Chambers and Jimmy Haslip	Triple Play	2023
ABLX-071	Shakti	Mind Explosion: 50th Anniversary Tour Live	2025
ABLX-072	Paul Hanson	The Outer Banks	2026

== See also ==
- List of record labels
