= Duet (Jeff Coffin and Jeff Sipe album) =

Live album by Jeff Coffin and Jeff Sipe
- Released: 2011
- Venue: Porter Center, Brevard, North Carolina
- Genre: Jazz
- Length: 46:04
- Label: Compass; 7 4554 2

Jeff Coffin chronology
Mutopia (2008)	Duet (2011)	Live! (2011)

Jeff Sipe chronology
Timeless (2006)	Duet (2011)	Jeff Sipe Trio (2014)

Duet is a live album by saxophonist Jeff Coffin and drummer Jeff Sipe. It was recorded over two and a half days at the Porter Center in Brevard, North Carolina, and was released in 2011 by Compass Records.

In an interview, Coffin stated that the musicians' goal in recording the album was "to make music together and to try a bunch of different things and decide after the fact what it was going to become—let the music tell us what it wanted to be rather than us trying to dictate the music what we wanted it to be... The idea was to try to have a nice balance leaning more toward the side of improvisation than composition, but there are compositional ideas in there as well." Regarding the final result, he commented: "We took everything that we played... and I broke it down into 46 minutes of music. So it's basically one seamless piece of music. It's meant to be listened to as one piece, but you can break it up into sections also."

== Reception ==
In a review for JazzTimes, Bill Meredith wrote: "Before listening to Duet, it might be best to forget everything you already know about its creators... Expecting anything resembling... either of these two musicians' previous... work, may result in disappointment... With an open mind, however, this series of improvisational dialogues... is equally rewarding and challenging."

Modern Drummer's Ilya Stemkovsky called the album "a beautifully textured, free-form session," and stated: "Avoiding the funky fusion they're occasionally known for, Duet allows us to eavesdrop on a conversation between two talented old friends."

Austin Bealmear of The Nashville Musician described the album as "music without category, made by two musicians who have 'big ears'... and years of performing experience across a vast range of genres." He commented: "These musical conversations are poetic and meditational... and both players' instrumental virtuosity creates enough detail and surprise to bear repeated listenings."

Writing for Sax Shed, Skip Spratt remarked: "Although I personally may not be a huge fan of such experimental and improvisational works as Duet, it is clear that Jeff Coffin and Jeff Sipe are two serious, accomplished musicians. Their passion and seriousness toward this music is evident throughout the recording."

== Track listing ==
1. "Reintroduction" – 2:02
2. "Once Again Together" – 2:06
3. "Mr. Lloyd and Master Higgins" – 6:04
4. "In the Folds" – 2:05
5. "Concurrent Events" – 1:44
6. "Smiling Faces" – 2:11
7. "From East to West" – 2:44
8. "Should I Stand" – 7:10
9. "Quiet Arrival" – 5:13
10. "Nearly" – 5:13
11. "Scattering" – 2:08
12. "First Light (Reprise)" – 2:18
13. "Koty Blue" – 5:04

== Personnel ==
- Jeff Coffin – saxophone, flute, percussion
- Jeff Sipe – drums, percussion
