= Basically Frightened =

"Basically Frightened" is a song written by Col. Bruce Hampton, Tinsley Ellis and Ricky Keller. The song was first recorded and released on Col. Bruce Hampton's 1986 solo album "Arkansas" on Landslide Records.

The song was frequently performed by Southern jam band legends Col. Bruce Hampton and the Aquarium Rescue Unit. The lineup of ARU featuring Hampton, Oteil Burbridge, Jimmy Herring, Matt Mundy, and Jeff Sipe recorded the song and released it on their debut self-titled album in 1992. That same year Billy Bob Thornton directed the movie Widespread Panic: Live from the Georgia Theatre which features a music video for "Basically Frightened" recorded by Widespread's opening act, ARU.

The song also appeared on a 1994 compilation retrospective of Col. Bruce Hampton's solo career titled "Strange Voices: A History 1977-1987," also on Landslide Records.

Bruce Hampton wrote and directed a short film in the 1990s called "Basically Frightened."
