= Subject to Change Without Notice =

Studio album by Jimmy Herring
- Released: 2012
- Studios: John Keane Studios, Athens, Georgia
- Genre: Jazz fusion
- Length: 58:27
- Labels: Abstract Logix; ABLX 035 / ABLX 0630
- Producer: John Keane

Jimmy Herring chronology
Lifeboat (2008)	Subject to Change Without Notice (2012)	Live in San Francisco (2018)

Subject to Change Without Notice is an album by guitarist Jimmy Herring. His second release as a leader, it was recorded in Georgia, United States, and was issued on LP and CD by Abstract Logix in 2012. On the album, which was produced by John Keane, Herring is joined by keyboardist Matt Slocum, bassists Neal Fountain and Etienne Mbappe, and drummer Jeff Sipe, along with guest musicians Bill Evans (saxophone), Béla Fleck (banjo), Tyler Greenwell (drums), Carter Herring (cello), Nicky Sanders (violin), and Ike Stubblefield (organ).

== Reception ==
Professional ratings
Review scores
Source	Rating
AllMusic	4/5 stars
DownBeat	4.5/5 stars
All About Jazz	4/5 stars
Glide Magazine	4/5 stars

In a review for AllMusic, Hal Horowitz called the recording "an impressively diverse album that's performed with fire, passion, and a sophistication that's always at the heart of the guitarist's classy approach."

Bill Milkowski, writing for DownBeat, described the album as "a revelation from the great beyond," and noted: "Herring's striking originals... demonstrate the scope of his open-minded musicality on his second release as a leader."

Ian Patterson of All About Jazz commented: "Subject to Change Without Notice, whilst stylistically diverse, could be classified as a blues album, as the blues lies at the core of the playing. Herring, for his part, has never sounded more relaxed, nor in finer tune, on what is a highly enjoyable recording." AAJ's Alan Bryson stated: "This is an album that keeps me coming back for more, and eager to discover what [Herring's] musical future holds," while Doug Collette remarked: "Herring fully participates but declines to hog the spotlight; his humility may be his greatest asset, apart from his lightning touch."

Writing for Relix, Scott Bernstein called the album "exceptional," and stated: "Subject to Change Without Notice finds Herring mashing disparate genres such as jazz fusion, blues, psychedelic rock and bluegrass with ease."

Brian Robbins of Jambands.com wrote that the album "covers a lot of ground and takes you to many different places. And Jimmy Herring and friends prove to be great tour guides."

Glide Magazine's Bryan Rodgers commented: "Subject To Change Without Notice is certainly a guitar record first, and that can be a dangerous thing in the wrong hands. Fortunately, Herring has the humility and common sense to showcase the rest of the players as well, making this album so much more: one of the most notable instrumental releases of the year."

In an article for Premier Guitar, Jason Shadrick, referring to the Jeff Beck album, stated: "This is Herring's Wired, a snapshot of a stylistically unmatched guitar giant who not only has chops galore, but knows when to take his foot off the gas and tug on your heartstrings with tone and taste."

== Track listing ==
=== Side A ===
1. "Red Wing Special" (Jimmy Herring) – 5:12
2. "Kaleidoscope Carousel" (Jimmy Herring) – 7:53
3. "Utensil Oceans" (Jimmy Herring) – 4:48 (LP-only track)

=== Side B ===
1. "Aberdeen" (Jimmy Herring) – 6:52
2. "Within You Without You" (George Harrison) – 7:15

=== Side C ===
1. "Miss Poopie" (Horace Ott) – 6:16
2. "Emerald Garden" (Jimmy Herring) – 6:08
3. "Twelve Keys" (Jimmy Herring) – 5:27

=== Side D ===
1. "Hope" (John McLaughlin) – 6:41
2. "Curfew" (Jimmy Herring) – 4:52
3. "Bilgewater Blues" (Jimmy Herring) – 4:01

== Personnel ==
- Jimmy Herring – guitars
- Matt Slocum – organ (1, 2, 7, 8, 11), keyboards (3, 9), marxophone (5), clavinet (6, 11)
- Ike Stubblefield – organ (4, 6)
- John Keane – pedal steel guitar (3, 7, 9)
- Béla Fleck – banjo (10)
- Etienne Mbappe – bass (1, 2, 4, 7–9)
- Neal Fountain – bass (3, 5, 6, 10, 11)
- Jeff Sipe – drums (1, 3–10)
- Tyler Greenwell – drums (2, 11)
- Bill Evans – soprano saxophone (3), tenor saxophone (9)
- Nicky Sanders – fiddle (1)
- Carter Herring – cello (5, 9)

== Production ==
- Souvik Dutta – executive producer
- Shweta Dutta – executive producer
- John Keane – producer, recording, mixing
- Glenn Schick – mastering at Glenn Schick Mastering (Atlanta, Georgia)
