= Lifeboat (album) =

Studio album by Jimmy Herring
- Released: 2008
- Studios: Bakos Amp Works and Tree Sound Studio (Atlanta, Georgia); Rush Hour Studio (Woodstock, Georgia)
- Genre: Jazz fusion
- Length: 1:00:04
- Labels: Abstract Logix; ABLX 013
- Producer: Jimmy Herring

Jimmy Herring chronology
Lifeboat (2008)	Subject to Change Without Notice (2012)

Lifeboat is an album by guitarist Jimmy Herring. His first release as a leader, it was recorded in Georgia, United States, and was issued by Abstract Logix in 2008. On the album, Herring is joined by keyboardist and flutist Kofi Burbridge, bassist Oteil Burbridge, and drummer Jeff Sipe, along with guest musicians Greg Osby (saxophone), Derek Trucks (slide guitar), Bobby Lee Rodgers (rhythm guitar), Ike Stubblefield (organ), Scott Kinsey (organ), Matt Slocum (keyboards), and Tyler Greenwell (drums).

In an interview, Herring stated: "People have asked me why I haven't put out my own album before now but I was always more interested in being a sideman. Instead of being a band leader, I decided that I would be the best sideman that I could be." He reflected: "To me it was all about making a record of music and not guitar music. Some people might be disappointed because they thought it would be a guitar shred festival the whole time but I didn't want to do that. The idea was to have the music be the main thing, not the guitar."

Regarding the inclusion of George Bruns' "Jungle Book Overture" on the album, Herring recalled that he first heard it as a youth, then later played it for his own children. He commented: "it was in my subsconcious... I realized that pieces of that melody were showing up in my improvisations... I always thought I gotta record this some day."

The album cover features a photograph of Herring's mother when she was 23 years old and on her honeymoon. Herring stated: "My dad took the picture from the back of the boat. It's a family-oriented thing music wise and inspiration wise."

== Reception ==
Professional ratings
Review scores
Source	Rating
AllMusic	3.5/5 stars
All About Jazz	4.5/5 stars
All About Jazz	4.5/5 stars

In a review for AllMusic, Jeff Tamarkin wrote: "Herring shows restraint where other guitarists would show off, and that economical approach -- which isn't to say he doesn't dazzle when it's called for -- serves the music well. Although the set flirts with genre jumping, the closer Herring and friends get to true jazz, the more gleeful they seem."

John Kelman of All About Jazz stated: "Herring's ability to confidently mix things up while playing with a refreshing honesty and lack of posturing throughout makes Lifeboat as rare a fusion record as he is a fusion guitarist... With a result this good, hopefully Herring won't wait quite so long to make another." AAJ's Ian Patterson wrote: "It's been a while coming, but Jimmy Herring's solo debut is a major achievement and will no doubt ride high in quite a number of best-of-2008 lists in jazz, rock, fusion and guitar periodicals alike. Let's hope Lifeboat is just the beginning of a long solo discography."

Writing for Jazz Times, Bill Meredith commented: "Lifeboat is the first solo outing by the underrated guitarist, who can play with the flash of any fusion hero-but also knows when not to... No matter how many notes this guitarist plays, from one to a flurry, he makes every one count."

James Calemine of Snake Nation Press wrote: "This instrumental CD contains some of the most complex and invigorating jazz-rock recorded in the last decade... Lifeboat is further testimony to Herring's incandescent talent for songwriting, guitar virtuosity and his ability to serve as a catalyst for other accomplished musicians to streamline a coherent sound."

A reviewer for The Guitar Channel remarked: "Lifeboat shows that Herring has a deep love for jazz, and he's very adept at playing that style of music. Without question, this is one of the most inventive, fresh, and moving jazz releases of the year, and it's a huge triumph for Herring."

JamBase's Eric Podolsky stated: "In his mastery of the electric guitar, [Herring] is able to combine the cerebral with the soulful, and mash them together into one blissful element. Lifeboat succeeds in doing just that, and in doing so provides us with a long-overdue window into Herring's head (and heart)."

== Track listing ==
1. "Scapegoat Blues" (Jimmy Herring) – 6:37
2. "Only When It's Light" (Kofi Burbridge) – 6:08
3. "New Moon" (Jimmy Herring) – 6:10
4. "Lifeboat Serenade" (Jimmy Herring) – 6:00
5. "One Strut" (Jimmy Herring) – 7:32
6. "Jungle Book Overture" (George Bruns) – 6:34
7. "Lost" (Wayne Shorter) – 6:18
8. "Transients" (Jimmy Herring) – 5:32
9. "Gray Day" (Jimmy Herring) – 7:02
10. "Splash" (Kofi Burbridge) – 6:27

== Personnel ==
- Jimmy Herring – guitars
- Matt Slocum – acoustic piano (1, 3–5), clavinet (1, 3–5), organ (1, 3–5)
- Kofi Burbridge – acoustic piano (2, 6–10), flute (2, 6–10)
- Scott Kinsey – organ (2)
- Ike Stubblefield – organ (4)
- Bobby Lee Rodgers – rhythm guitar (1), Leslie guitar (5)
- Derek Trucks – slide guitar (3, 4)
- Oteil Burbridge – bass
- Jeff Sipe – drums (1–3, 5–10)
- Tyler Greenwell – drums (4)
- Greg Osby – alto saxophone (6–10), soprano saxophone (6–10)

== Production ==
- Souvik Dutta – executive producer
- Shweta Dutta – executive producer
- Jimmy Herring – producer
- Rush Anderson – engineer, mixing
- Jeff Bakos – engineer, mixing
- Scott Kinsey – mastering
- Arjun Mirta – graphic design
- Cameron Herring – inside lifeboat photography
- Paige Inabinett – inside lifeboat photography
- Jay Kurinskas – back cover photography
