= Joseph Patrick Moore =

American bass player

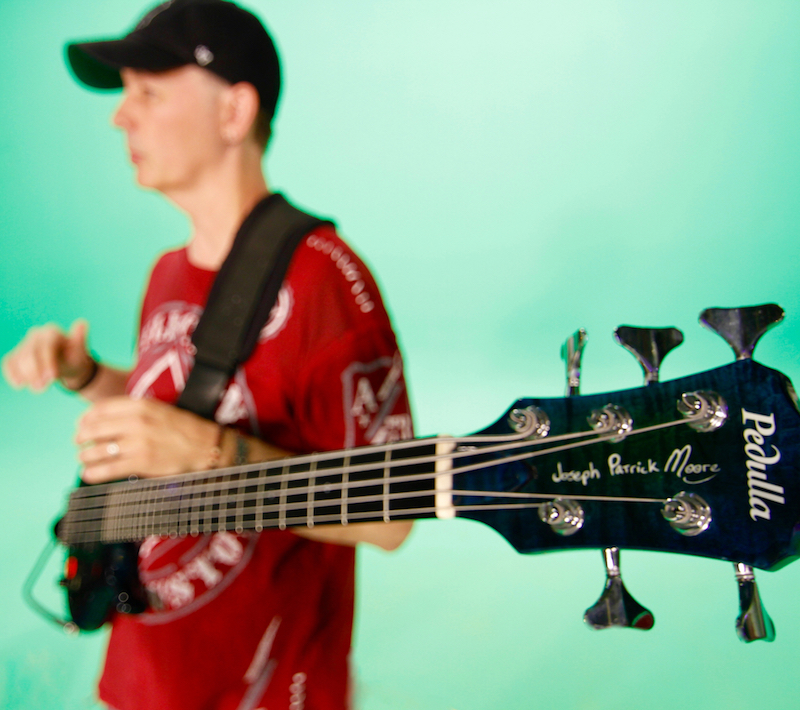
- Moore in 2014

Background information
- Born: October 1, 1969 (age 57); Knoxville, Tennessee, United States
- Genres: Jazz, electronica, rock, smooth jazz, jazz fusion
- Occupations: Musician, composer, record producer, arranger
- Instruments: Double bass, bass guitar, fretless bass, keyboards
- Years active: 1996–present
- Label: Blue Canoe
- Website: josephpatrickmoore.com
- Moore's voice, 2018 Moore introducing himself

Joseph Patrick Moore (born October 1, 1969) is an American musician from Knoxville, Tennessee, United States. He is a bass player, composer, arranger and record producer who has played alongside Colonel Bruce Hampton, Earl Klugh, Stewart Copeland, John Popper, and Derek Trucks. In 2003, he founded Blue Canoe Records, the internet's first all-digital independent jazz label; he co-owns the label with Travis Prescott.

== Early years ==
Moore began playing alto saxophone at the age of seven in public school. As a freshman in high school, he took up drums as a member of the marching band. He switched to the bass during his second year. He has said that he was initially inspired by a recurring dream he had about playing the electric bass. He was influenced early by the playing of Paul Chambers, Jimmy Blanton, Ray Brown, and Ron Carter.

One of Moore's first teachers was Rusty Holloway, an instructor at the University of Tennessee, Knoxville, who himself had played with Woody Herman and Dizzy Gillespie, among others. Heeding Holloway's advice, Moore enrolled at the university as a classical studies and jazz performance major, with a concentration on electric bass and double bass. He began playing in bands in Knoxville, including Without Warning (with Nick Raskulinecz) and Sage (with Travis Wyrick). After two and a half years, Moore transferred to the University of Memphis, to be in a city that provided more professional musical opportunities.

== Career ==
Moore began playing nightly on Beale Street with The Charlie Wood Trio. He soon found additional work as a studio musician, teacher, and live performer. In 1996, Moore released his first solo album, Never Never Land, which he financed, arranged, and produced—at the time, an unusual move for a jazz musician. That year, Moore was nominated for a Premier Player award by the Memphis Chapter of the National Academy of Recording Arts and Sciences.

In 1997, Moore moved to Atlanta, where he has remained. He began playing there with Col. Bruce Hampton and his band the Fiji Mariners. As part of Hampton's band, Moore had the opportunity to play with a variety of accomplished guest musicians, including Warren Haynes, John Popper, Derek Trucks, Vassar Clements, and Buddy Miles.

After releasing two more albums, Moore grew disillusioned with the "rat race experience" of shopping for a record deal and decided to start his own record label. He was inspired in part by the examples of musicians such as Ani DiFranco, Tony Levin, and Herbie Hancock. He also received some direct advice from Peter Erskine, drummer for the band Weather Report, who had also started his own label.

Founded in 2003, Moore's Blue Canoe Records was the first independent jazz label to be an all-digital label. Moore has maintained an active recording and touring schedule and played through the rest of the decade alongside a number of musicians, including Stewart Copeland, Earl Klugh, Bob James, and Chris Duarte. In 2010, Moore released To Africa With Love, an album that he also composed, arranged, engineered, and mixed. His latest release as leader is the EP XYZ Factor, released in December 2011. For the Dutch Radio Westerwolde he made a radio jingle for The Toppyjazz Radio Show.

In 2014/2015 he formed the RockTronix releasing a CD and DVD documentary movie titled, Magnificent Obsession on Blue Canoe Records. In 2016 Moore released Decade II 2006-2015. Decade II which is a remastered CD compilation of selected composition's recorded between 2006 through 2015 and is a follow-up to Decade 1996-2005.

In 2017, Moore moved to his current home of Henderson, Nevada. In addition to his touring and recording schedule and productions for Blue Canoe Records, Moore was contracted with Cirque du Soleil as an "On-Call Artist" for the residence show Kà located at the MGM Grand in Las Vegas from 2017-2020, and his contract ended when the COVID-19 pandemic took hold in March 2020.

In 2019 (pre-COVID), Moore released Nevada Sun. In addition to the bass, he played and programmed all the instruments on Nevada Sun. It was mixed by Moore and mastered by Rich Breen.

In 2022, Moore signed a contract with Cirque Du Soleil as a "Full-Time Artist" for the residency show Mystère located at the Treasure Island Casino in Las Vegas. The current schedule is two shows a night, five days a week (Friday - Tuesday).

== Discography ==
=== As front man ===
- Never Never Land (1996)
- Soul Cloud (2000) (featuring Jimmy Herring and Yonrico Scott)
- Alone Together (2002)
- Drum & Bass Society, Volume One (2004) (featuring Jeff Sipe and Dan Matrazzo)
- Live in 05 (2005)
- Decade 1996–2005 (2006)
- Pause (iTunes Exclusive) (2007)
- Starbucking (soundtrack) (2007)
- To Africa With Love (2010)
- Path to Geshe (soundtrack) (2011)
- XYZ Factor EP (2011)
- Decade II 2006-2015 (2016)
- Nevada Sun (2019)
- "3 Degrees Of Separation" (single) (2022)
- "Ever-Changing" (single) (2024)
- "Captain Bateman's Basement" (single) (2024)

=== As side man (selected) ===
- It's a Swing Thing – Andrew Carlton & the Swing Doctors (2000)
- The Best Impression of Insanity – Jag Star (2006)
- Vantage Point – Chris Duarte (2008)
- Eric Clapton: Crossroads Guitar Festival 2010 – DVD (2010) (appearance with Earl Klugh)
