= Live in San Francisco (John McLaughlin and Jimmy Herring album) =

2018 live album by John McLaughlin and Jimmy Herring

Live album by John McLaughlin and the 4th Dimension / Jimmy Herring and the Invisible Whip
- Released: 2018
- Recorded: December 8th, 2017
- Venue: The Warfield, San Francisco, California
- Genre: Jazz fusion
- Label: Abstract Logix; ABLX 059
- Producer: John McLaughlin

John McLaughlin chronology
Live at Ronnie Scott's (2017)	Live in San Francisco (2018)	Is That So? (2020)

Jimmy Herring chronology
Subject to Change Without Notice (2012)	Live in San Francisco (2018)

Live in San Francisco is a live album by guitarists John McLaughlin and Jimmy Herring. It was recorded at The Warfield in San Francisco, California, on December 8, 2017, and was released in 2018 by Abstract Logix. The musicians are joined by an ensemble that combines McLaughlin's band the 4th Dimension with Herring's band the Invisible Whip.

The album was recorded during the 25-date "Meeting of the Spirits" tour, concerts of which consisted of Herring and his band as an opener, followed by McLaughlin and his band, after which all the musicians joined together for a third set during which they performed music previously recorded by the Mahavishnu Orchestra on the albums The Inner Mounting Flame (1971), Birds of Fire (1973), Between Nothingness & Eternity (1973), and Visions of the Emerald Beyond (1975). Prior to the tour, McLaughlin reflected: "I'm not the same person I was when I wrote [those Mahavishnu compositions], but they're still a huge part of my musical and personal history, and the idea of bringing them up to date is very attractive to me."

At the time, McLaughlin stated that the tour would be his last due to the effects of arthritis in his hands and wrist. He commented: "Short of a miracle, I think that'll probably be it, at least in terms of touring." However, thanks to ongoing treatments, he was able to begin touring again, beginning with a European trip in late 2019.

Prior to the concert, McLaughlin had not performed at The Warfield for over 35 years. The live album Friday Night in San Francisco, with Al Di Meola and Paco de Lucía, was recorded there in 1980.

== Reception ==
Professional ratings
Review scores
Source	Rating
All About Jazz	4/5 stars
Jazzwise	4/5 stars
The Times	4/5 stars

In a review for All About Jazz, Mike Jacobs wrote: "There's an undeniable thrill transmitted in the opening blasts of 'Meeting of the Spirits' on this record. Embodied in them are not only the first bracing salvos heralding the MO's birth in 1971, but also the promise of their long hoped-for reincarnation. From those notes on, that promise is gratifyingly fulfilled."

Stuart Nicholson of Jazzwise stated that the musicians' "combined power captures the spirit of the original Mahavishnu Orchestra, with McLaughlin making the hairs on the back of your neck well and truly stand to attention. Comparisons between then and now miss the point, it's clear McLaughlin wanted to exit the international touring circuit with a bang, leaving his audience wanting more, and he succeeded."

Jazz Weekly's George W. Harris called the program "a testosterone filled evening of the best that jazz-rock has to offer," and commented: "All throughout McLaughlin sounds electrifyingly both at peace and inspired, and while he may not have all of the chops he once had... he still has the vision."

A reviewer for Sounds of Surprise wrote: "McLaughlin's message is still that an open mind and peaceful heart are the keys to both musical and human progression – that hasn't changed much over the years. And also that good music needs an element of madness. Anyone who has found solace and inspiration in his work over the years, as I have, will find this a moving and important album."

== Track listing ==
All compositions by John McLaughlin.

1. "Meeting of the Spirits" – 8:53
2. "Birds of Fire" – 7:50
3. "A Lotus on Irish Streams" – 7:13
4. "The Dance of Maya" – 10:09
5. "Trilogy" – 13:01
6. "Earth Ship" – 8:59
7. "Eternity’s Breath Part 1 & 2" – 9:39
8. "Be Happy" – 7:05

== Personnel ==
- John McLaughlin – 12 string double neck and 6 string guitars
- Jimmy Herring – guitar
- Gary Husband – keyboards
- Matt Slocum – keyboards
- Jason Crosby – violin, keyboards, vocals
- Etienne M'Bappe – bass, vocals
- Kevin Scott – bass
- Ranjit Barot – drums, konokol, vocals
- Jeff Sipe – drums, gong
