= Matt Garrison =

American jazz bassist (born 1970)

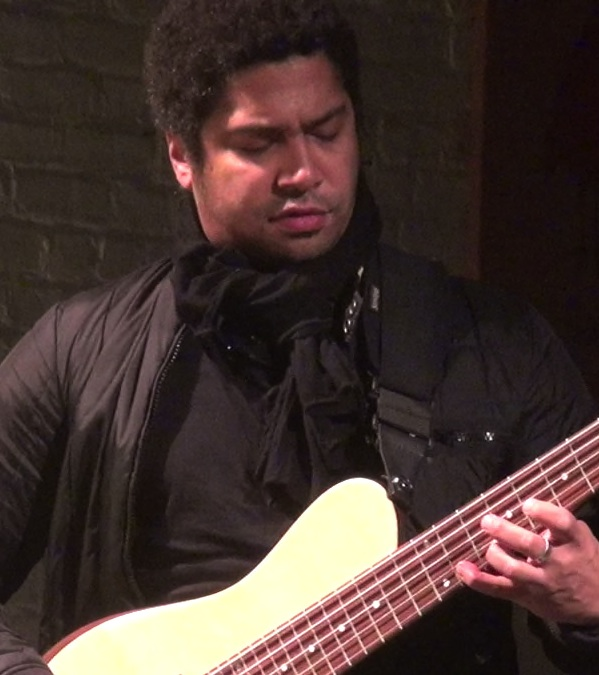

Background information
- Born: Matthew Justin Garrison; June 2, 1970 (age 55); New York City, New York, U.S.
- Genres: Jazz, jazz fusion
- Occupation(s): Musician, record producer, label owner
- Instrument(s): Bass guitar, double bass
- Years active: 1991–present
- Labels: Garrison Jazz

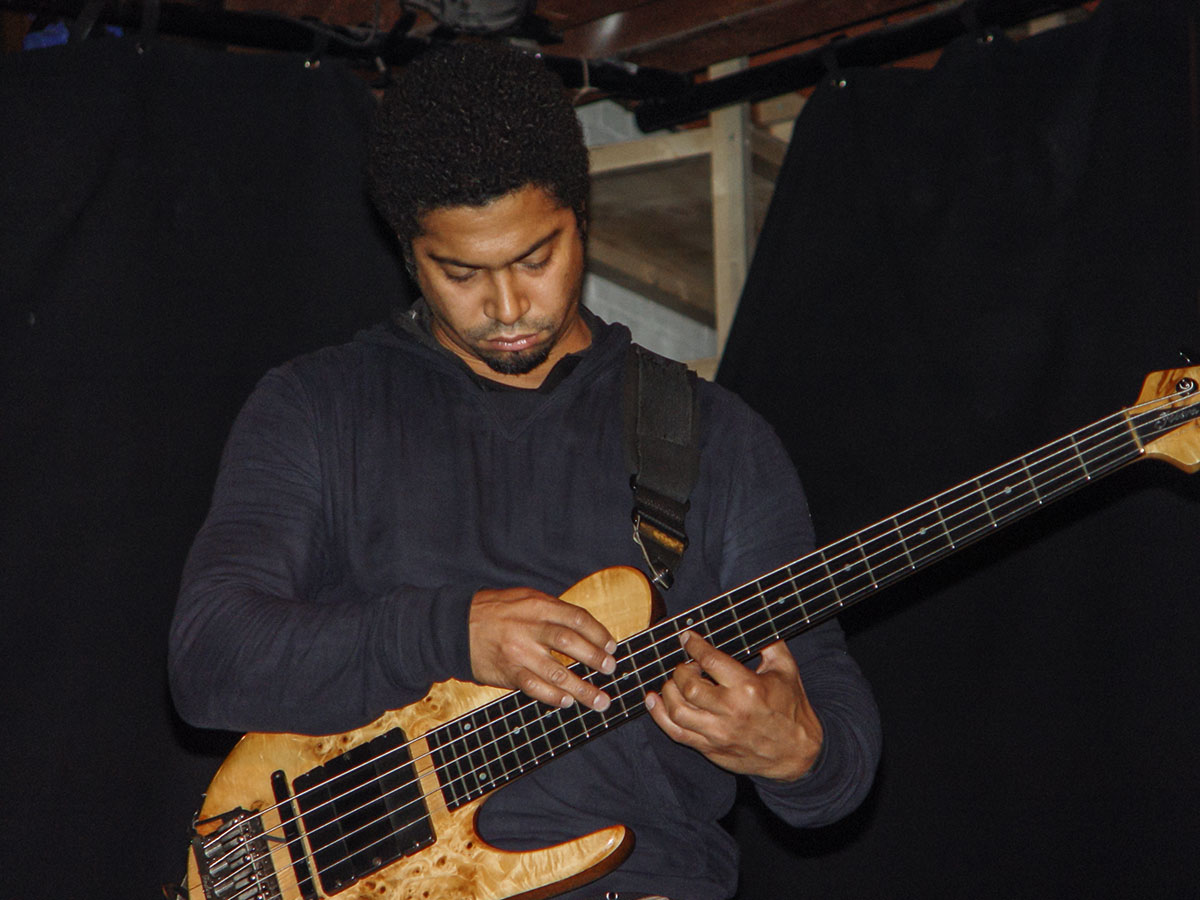
Denmark 2009 Photo Hreinn Gudlaugsson

Matthew Justin Garrison (born June 2, 1970) is an American jazz bassist.

Since 2011, he has run ShapeShifter Lab in Brooklyn, New York, with Fortuna Sung. Described by the New York Times as "an electric bass virtuoso", he has toured with Herbie Hancock.

His 2000 debut album, Matthew Garrison, was described by Bass Player magazine as having "raised the bar" for electric bass players.

In 2010, Garrison toured with R&B singer Whitney Houston during her Nothing but Love World Tour.

== Early life and pre-solo career ==
The son of jazz bassist Jimmy Garrison and modern dancer Roberta Escamilla Garrison, Matthew spent much of his childhood in Rome, Italy. In 1988, he returned to the U.S. to live with his godfather, Jack DeJohnette, with whom he recorded.

In 1989, he attended Berklee College of Music in Boston on a scholarship and began to play professionally. In 1994, he moved to New York City where he regularly performed and recorded with Gary Burton, Rashied Ali, Ravi Coltrane, Gil Evans Orchestra, Steve Coleman, Vernon Reid, Chaka Khan, Joni Mitchell, Joe Zawinul, The Saturday Night Live Band, John McLaughlin, John Scofield, Mike Stern, Pino Daniele and Wayne Krantz.

== Discography ==
=== As leader or co-leader ===
- Matthew Garrison (Garrison Jazz, 2000)
- Shapeshifter (2004)
- Improvision with Alex Machacek, Jeff Sipe (Abstract Logix, 2007)
- Shapeshifter Live (Garrison Jazz, 2011)
- In Movement with Jack DeJohnette, Ravi Coltrane (ECM, 2016)

=== As sideman ===
- Rashied Ali, No One in Particular (Survival, 2001)
- Terri Lyne Carrington, More to Say (Real Life Story: Nextgen) (E1, 2009)
- Dennis Chambers, Outbreak (ESC, 2002)
- Steve Coleman, The Tao of Mad Phat (Novus, 1993)
- Steve Coleman, Def Trance Beat (BMG Victor, 1995)
- Pino Daniele, Boogie Boogie Man (RCA, 2010)
- Philipp Gerschlauer & David Fiuczynski, Mikrojazz! (RareNoise, 2017)
- Chico Hamilton, Trio! Live @ Artpark (Joyous Shout, 2008)
- Herbie Hancock, Future 2 Future Live (Columbia, 2002)
- Rita Marcotulli, Us and Them (Casa Del Jazz, 2008)
- Rita Marcotulli, A Pino (Casa del Jazz, 2016)
- John McLaughlin, The Heart of Things (Verve, 1997)
- John McLaughlin, The Heart of Things: Live in Paris (Verve, 2000)
- John McLaughlin, Industrial Zen (Verve, 2006)
- Andy Milne, Forward to Get Back (D'Note, 1997)
- Bob Moses, Time Stood Still (Gramavision, 1994)
- Meshell Ndegeocello, The Spirit Music Jamia: Dance of the Infidel (EmArcy, 2005)
- Wolfgang Reisinger, Refusion (EmArcy, 2006)
- Revolution Void, Increase the Dosage (2005)
- Wallace Roney, Prototype (HighNote, 2004)
- World Saxophone Quartet, Experience (Justin Time, 2004)
- Joe Zawinul, Mark Whitfield, Wallace Roney Quartet (Jazz a Go-go, 1995)
- Joe Zawinul, My People (Tone Center, 1996)
