= Improvision (album) =

Studio album by Alex Machacek, Jeff Sipe, and Matthew Garrison
- Released: 2007
- Recorded: April 2007
- Genre: Jazz fusion
- Length: 54:55
- Label: Abstract Logix; ABLX 007
- Producer: Alex Machacek

Alex Machacek chronology
Sic (2006)	Improvision (2007)	The Official Triangle Sessions (2009)

Improvision is an album by guitarist Alex Machacek, drummer Jeff Sipe, and bassist Matthew Garrison. It was recorded in April 2007, and was released later that year by Abstract Logix.

== Reception ==
Professional ratings
Review scores
Source	Rating
All About Jazz	5/5 stars
All About Jazz	5/5 stars

In a review for Jazz Times, Forrest Dylan Bryant praised the album's "quicksilver melody and locomotive rhythm," and wrote: "this progressive fusion disc proclaims the continued vitality of electric and electronic jazz."

John Kelman of All About Jazz awarded the album a full 5 stars, calling it "another step forward for a kind of intelligent fusion that juxtaposes inspired soloing with near-telepathic interplay and imaginative writing." AAJ's Ian Patterson also awarded the album 5 stars, calling it "wonderful music," and commenting: "The CD sleeve suggests filing Improvision under Jazz/Rock. Perhaps a more fertile idea, in keeping with the music, and in the hope that it reaches the widest possible audience would be to file it under Extraordinary."

A writer for The Free Jazz Collective remarked: "the music evolves from high speed and intense music with lots of soloing to a calmer atmosphere in the end, with subdued and even some meditative moments."

== Track listing ==
1. "There's a New Sheriff in Town" – 6:26
2. "Along Came a Spider" – 4:27
3. "Shona" – 6:59
4. "Gem1" – 5:21
5. "Gem2" – 2:45
6. "To Whom It May Concern" – 2:40
7. "Yoga for Cats 1" – 2:21
8. "Yoga for Cats 2" – 4:48
9. "Very Sad" – 8:13
10. "Matt's Riff" – 4:56
11. "Put Me Back to Sleep" – 5:59

== Personnel ==
- Alex Machacek – guitar, guitar synthesizer
- Matthew Garrison – bass
- Jeff Sipe – drums
