= Col. Bruce Hampton and the Aquarium Rescue Unit =

American jazz fusion band

Col. Bruce Hampton and The Aquarium Rescue Unit
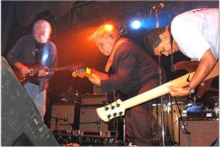
- October 2004

Background information
- Origin: Atlanta, Georgia United States
- Genres: Jam band, jazz fusion
- Years active: 1988–1997, 2004–2007, 2015
- Labels: Capricorn, Evil Teen Records, Velvet Dwarf Records, Inio Music
- Spinoffs: Frogwings; Jazz Is Dead; Surrender to the Air
- Spinoff of: Hampton Grease Band; The Late Bronze Age
- Past members: Col. Bruce Hampton; Jimmy Herring; Oteil Burbridge; Jeff Sipe; Matt Slocum; Jeff Mosier; Chuck Leavell; Charlie Williams; Count M'Butu; Matt Mundy; Kofi Burbridge "Little John" Roberts; Paul Henson; Lee Venters
- Website: Official Website

Col. Bruce Hampton and the Aquarium Rescue Unit was a jam band founded by Col. Bruce Hampton. The band gained popularity in the Atlanta club scene in the early 1990s and went on to tour with the first H.O.R.D.E. Tour. During their formative years, the band was composed of Bruce Hampton, Oteil Burbridge, Jimmy Herring, Jeff Sipe, Matt Mundy, and Count M'Butu. Jeff Mosier and Charlie Williams were members of the band during the early years, but left to pursue other endeavors. Although the band was never commercially successful, their combination of bluegrass, rock, Latin, blues, jazz, funk, and impeccable chops became a template for future bands.

== History ==
The band originated from a weekly Atlanta jam session hosted by Hampton (from the Hampton Grease Band and The Late Bronze Age) and eventually toured around the Southeastern United States with Hampton, Herring, Burbridge, Sipe, Mundy, and M'Butu. This lineup produced two albums released on Capricorn Records; Col. Bruce Hampton and the Aquarium Rescue Unit, in 1992, and Mirrors of Embarrassment, in 1993.

During the summer of 1992, the group helped start the H.O.R.D.E. tour with such like-minded bands as Phish, Spin Doctors, Blues Traveler, Bela Fleck & the Flecktones, and Widespread Panic. Members of these bands would frequently tour, perform, and record with one another. Béla Fleck and John Popper contributed on Mirrors of Embarrassment and Popper also contributed to The Benefit Concert Vol. 2. Chuck Leavell played on ARU's first two albums on Capricorn Records. Also, in 1992 Billy Bob Thornton directed the movie Widespread Panic: Live from the Georgia Theatre which features a music video for "Basically Frightened" performed by Col. Bruce Hampton & The Aquarium Rescue Unit with Chuck Leavell and Count M'Butu.

=== Break-up ===
In 1993 the band lost two key members when Matt Mundy retired from the band and Hampton soon followed. Oteil, Herring and Sipe continued to tour as "The Aquarium Rescue Unit." The band had a rotating outer cast of members over the years, including lead vocalist Paul Henson; Oteil's brother, Kofi Burbridge on keyboards, flute, back-up vocals; and drummer Sean O'Rourke. They recorded additional studio albums as Aquarium Rescue Unit: 1994's eeePee and In A Perfect World, and 2003's The Calling.

The remaining original members started to leave as they received offers from other larger acts. Jeff Sipe joined with Jonas Hellborg and the late Shawn Lane in 1995, and over the years has played with Leftover Salmon, Susan Tedeschi, Phil Lesh, and Trey Anastasio. Currently Jeff Sipe is playing drums for Keller Williams's new band the WMDs. In 1997, Oteil Burbridge replaced Allen Woody in The Allman Brothers Band. Burbridge also played in Phish keyboardist Page McConnell's side project Vida Blue, on Trey Anastasio's Surrender to the Air, and in his own occasional project, Oteil And The Peacemakers. He continued to play with the Allman Brothers Band until the band officially broke up on 10/28/2014. During the last few years of his time with the Allman Brothers, Oteil was also a full-time member the Tedeschi Trucks Band. He was asked to fill the bass slot in the post-Fare Thee Well incarnation of The Grateful Dead when Phil Lesh decided he no longer wanted to tour. This project is called Dead & Company. Jimmy Herring co-founded Jazz Is Dead in 1998, then toured and recorded with supergroup Frogwings, The Allman Brothers Band, Project Z, Phil Lesh and Friends, and The Dead. In 2006 Herring was asked to join Widespread Panic with whom he has recorded and toured extensively.

=== Reunion ===
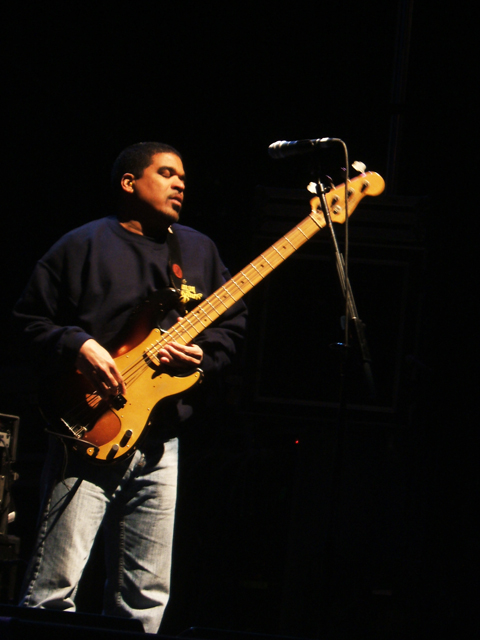
Burbridge on bass

In 2004 Hampton, Herring, Sipe, Burbridge and M'Butu reunited for several shows as the original Col. Bruce Hampton and Aquarium Rescue Unit. They continued with eight shows in Colorado and the Southeast between January 2006 and May 2007. Bobby Lee Rodgers of The Codetalkers was asked to sit in on banjo and vocals, taking the place of Matt Mundy who has retired from performing.

By 2007, each member of the original lineup was an accomplished artist in their own right: Herring with Widespread Panic, Burbridge with two bands: The Allman Brothers Band and Oteil and The Peacemakers, Sipe with Trey Anastasio and Leftover Salmon, M'Butu with The Derek Trucks Band, and Hampton with Col. Bruce & The Quark Alliance.

Aquarium Rescue Unit reunited for the reopening of the Georgia Theatre in Athens, Georgia, on August 8, 2011. The lineup included Col. Bruce Hampton, Jimmy Herring, Oteil Burbridge, Jeff Sipe and Matt Slocum on keyboards.

On March 24, 2015, via Facebook, Col. Bruce Hampton announced the band was getting back together for shows scheduled for summer 2015. The band returned to the lineup of Hampton, Oteil Burbridge, Jimmy Herring, Matt Slocum and Jeff Sipe.

== Discography ==
=== Aquarium Rescue Unit with Hampton ===
- Col. Bruce Hampton & the Aquarium Rescue Unit (1992) – Live album – Capricorn Records
- Mirrors of Embarrassment (1993) – Studio album – Capricorn Records
- Warren Haynes Presents: The Benefit Concert, Vol. 2 (2007) – Live album – Evil Teen Records

=== Aquarium Rescue Unit without Hampton ===
- In a Perfect World (1994) – Studio album – Velvet Dwarf Records
- EeePeee (EP, 1994)
- The Calling (2003) - Studio album - Inio Music
