= The Calling (Aquarium Rescue Unit album) =

Studio album by Aquarium Rescue Unit
- Released: 2003
- Recorded: 2000
- Venue: Exocet Studio, Atlanta, Georgia
- Genre: Rock
- Length: 1:02:06
- Label: Inio Music; 82327 10292
- Producer: Rodney Mills, Aquarium Rescue Unit

Aquarium Rescue Unit chronology
In a Perfect World (1994)	The Calling (2003)	Warren Haynes Presents: The Benefit Concert, Vol. 2 (2007)

The Calling is an album by the Aquarium Rescue Unit. The band's second record following the departure of former frontman Bruce Hampton, it was recorded in 2000 at Exocet Studio in Atlanta, Georgia, and was released in 2003 by Inio Music. The album features guitarist Jimmy Herring, keyboardist and flutist Kofi Burbridge, bassist Oteil Burbridge, vocalist Paul Henson, and drummer Sean O'Rourke, plus a number of guest musicians.

== Reception ==
Producer and journalist George Graham wrote: "On The Calling the band continues to shows its Southern rock roots throughout... With the re-emergence of The A-R-U we have the return of an outstanding group who last appeared before there was much of a contemporary jam band scene. Their musicianship is beyond reproach and the jazz-fusion influence gives this CD added artistic heft."

In a review for The Aspen Times, Stewart Oksenhorn stated: "It's hard to evaluate The Calling without comparing it to the albums with the original lineup. Yes, the instrumentation is fabulous complex and hard-hitting. But Henson, a good singer, doesn't have the vocal character of Hampton... The Calling is good, but that original mojo is missing. Calling the Colonel!"

Jesse Jarnow of Jambands.com called the album "a pale, pale shadow of what the band once represented," and commented: "Instead of reveling in it, the music now only borders on the abstract, instead favoring an adult contemporary liteness that is so far in that I'm almost willing to accept it as a big joke... What's missing, conceptually, is the band's triumphant sense of playfulness." However, he acknowledged that "it's always a joy to hear Jimmy Herring and Oteil Burbridge play music together."

A reviewer for ProGGnosis described the album as "a funky, soulful, r&b centered mix, with some slants towards fusion and jam rock," and remarked: "for those that enjoy a sincere, downhome, Southern r&b feel, with vocal oriented songs, paired with members that just happens to have the credentials to be a hot fusion band, a band that rears that venom from time to time, this is a great cd!"

== Track listing ==
1. "Hurt No More" (Oteil Burbridge / Paul Henson) – 3:43
2. "The Calling" (Paul Henson / Jimmy Herring) – 5:30
3. "Nice" (Kofi Burbridge / Paul Henson) – 7:02
4. "Through the Fire" (Kofi Burbridge / Paul Henson) – 5:47
5. "No Egos" (Oteil Burbridge / Col. Bruce Hampton) – 6:02
6. "Precious Child" (Oteil Burbridge / Paul Henson) – 5:44
7. "King in the Making" (Paul Henson / Jimmy Herring) – 3:50
8. "Ride" (Kofi Burbridge) – 6:36
9. "Page in Time" (Oteil Burbridge / Paul Henson) – 3:49
10. "How Ya Livin" (Paul Henson / Jimmy Herring) – 5:34
11. "Reflections" (Oteil Burbridge / Paul Henson) – 3:28
12. "Usaidtheredbefish" (Kofi Burbridge / Oteil Burbridge / Paul Henson / Jimmy Herring) – 5:01

== Personnel ==
- Jimmy Herring – guitar
- Kofi Burbridge – keyboards, flute, vocals
- Oteil Burbridge – bass, vocals
- Paul Henson – vocals
- Sean O'Rourke – drums, vocals

=== Additional musicians ===
- Derek Trucks – slide guitar (track 10)
- Count Mbutu – congas
- Brian Lopes – saxophone
- Sam Skelton – saxophone
- Eric Alexander – trombone
- Myrna Clayton – vocals
- Andrea Hopkins – vocals
