= Col. Bruce Hampton & the Aquarium Rescue Unit =

Live album by Col. Bruce Hampton and the Aquarium Rescue Unit
- Released: 1992
- Venues: Georgia Theatre, Athens, Georgia
- Genre: Southern rock
- Length: 58:31
- Labels: Capricorn Records; 9 42000-2
- Producer: Johnny Sandlin

Aquarium Rescue Unit chronology
Col. Bruce Hampton & the Aquarium Rescue Unit (1992)	Mirrors of Embarrassment (1993)

Bruce Hampton chronology
Arkansas (1987)	Col. Bruce Hampton & the Aquarium Rescue Unit (1992)	Mirrors of Embarrassment (1993)

Col. Bruce Hampton & the Aquarium Rescue Unit is a live album by the band of the same name. It was recorded at the Georgia Theatre in Athens, Georgia, and was released in 1992 by Capricorn Records. On the album, band leader Bruce Hampton is joined by guitarist Jimmy Herring, mandolin player Matt Mundy, keyboard player Chuck Leavell, bassist Oteil Burbridge, conga player Count Mbutu, and drummer Jeff Sipe, listed as "Apt. Q-258."

== Reception ==
Professional ratings
Review scores
Source	Rating
AllMusic	4/5 stars
The Rolling Stone Jazz & Blues Album Guide	4/5 stars

In a review for AllMusic, Brian Bartolini wrote: "Mix together some Southern rock, some blues, some funk, a little jazz, and a touch of psychedelia, and that's what you'll find on this enjoyable live set."

Rolling Stone's Robert Palmer noted that "there's a truly unique sensibility at work," and stated: "there's a bit of the Allmans' jazzier mode of improvising, Sea Level's sophisticated song structures and Wet Willie's cranked-up roadhouse R&B in the ARU's stylistic mix master. But this music is also post-Beefheart, post-Steely Dan, postbebop, post-Dixie Dregs, post-Sun Ra – it's just about posteverything." He concluded: "It rocks, swings, smacks, clangs, walks and runs, this music, with its eyes rolled back in its head."

Dan Kening, writing for the Chicago Tribune, called the music "an anarchistic mixture of jazz, rock and blues," and praised the album's instrumental work, but cautioned: "this chaotic curiosity is not for the faint of heart."

In an article for The Baltimore Sun, J.D. Considine commented: "Combining the best elements of Little Feat, the Dixie Dregs and Captain Beefheart, Hampton's... band offers a deft mix of Southern rock, casual jazz and warped blues that's tuneful, funny and unexpectedly addictive. Definitely worth taking a chance on."

Mike Joyce of The Washington Post remarked: "Hampton and the Rescue Unit shake things up..., improvising freely on Southern rock, blues, jazz, folk, R&B, bluegrass, fusion and gospel styles with a kind of playful virtuosity that's drawing increasingly bigger crowds."

== Track listing ==
1. "Introduction" (John Bell, Widespread Panic) – 1:29
2. "Fixin' to Die" (Booker T. White) – 3:23
3. "Yield Not to Temptation" (Ralph Bass, Sonny Thompson) – 4:01
4. "Working on a Building" (trad. arranged by Matt Mundy) – 4:46
5. "Time is Free" (David Earle Johnson) – 6:47
6. "Basically Frightened" (Bruce Hampton, Ricky Keller, Tinsley Ellis) – 4:19
7. "Compared to What" (Gene McDaniels) – 5:04
8. "Time Flack" (Bruce Hampton, Oteil Burbridge) – 4:47
9. "Davy Crockett" (Bruce Hampton, Charles Williams) – 5:07
10. "A Walk with Peltor" (Jeff Sipe) – 3:57
11. "Jazz Bank" (Bruce Hampton, Victor Francs) – 3:50
12. "Quinius Thoth" (Aquarium Rescue Unit) – 6:47
13. "Planet Earth" (Bruce Hampton, Oteil Burbridge) – 4:14
- Tracks 1–12 recorded live at the Georgia Theatre in Athens, Georgia. Track 13 recorded at Duck Tape Music in Decatur, Alabama.

== Personnel ==
- Col. Bruce Hampton – lead vocals, guitar, chazoid
- Jimmy Herring – guitar
- Matt Mundy – mandolin, vocals
- Chuck Leavell – piano, organ
- Oteil Burbridge – bass, vocals
- Count Mbutu – congas
- Jeff Sipe (listed as "Apt. Q258") – drums
