= Featuring Ourselves =

Studio album by Alex Machacek
- Released: 1999
- Genre: Jazz-Fusion
- Label: Next Generation Enterprises
- Producer: Alex Machacek

Alex Machacek chronology
| Featuring Ourselves (1999) | Delete and Roll (2002) |

Featuring Ourselves is a jazz/fusion album by Alex Machacek using the name "Mc Hacek." It was released by Next Generation Enterprises in 1999.

== Track listing ==
1. "Gnade" (Alex Machacek) – 6:56
2. "Liebe, Jaz Und Übermut" (Tibor Kövesdi) – 8:15
3. "Zapzarapp" (Alex Machacek) – 5:59
4. "Jazzquiz - Hard Version" (Alex Machacek) – 0:51
5. "Donna Lee - Easy Viennese Teenage Version" (Charlie Parker) – 2:17
6. "Intro 2 7" (Alex Machacek) – 0:36
7. "Allandig" (Alex Machacek) – 8:52
8. "Bänderriss" (Tibor Kövesdi) – 8:37
9. "Art-Subvention 97" (Alex Machacek) – 1:01
10. "... In the Sky" (Tibor Kövesdi) – 7:13

== Personnel ==
- Alex Machacek – guitars
- Tibor Kövesdi – bass, keyboards
- Flip Philipp – mallets, percussion
- Harri Ganglberger – drums
- Fritz Kircher – violin (track 2)
- Gerswind Olthoff – viola (track 2)
- Arne Kircher – cello (track 2)
- Toni Mühlhofer – percussion (track 3)
- Stefan Maass – percussion (track 10)
