= Mirrors of Embarrassment =

Studio album by Col. Bruce Hampton and the Aquarium Rescue Unit
- Released: 1993
- Label: Capricorn
- Producer: Johnny Sandlin

Aquarium Rescue Unit chronology
Col. Bruce Hampton & the Aquarium Rescue Unit (1992)	Mirrors of Embarrassment (1993)	In a Perfect World (1994)

Bruce Hampton chronology
Col. Bruce Hampton & the Aquarium Rescue Unit (1992)	Mirrors of Embarrassment (1993)	Strange Voices: A History 1977–1987 (1994)

Mirrors of Embarrassment is an album by the American band Col. Bruce Hampton and the Aquarium Rescue Unit. It is dedicated to Wayne Bennett.

The band supported the album by touring with the 1993 H.O.R.D.E. festival. Bruce Hampton left the band later the same year.

== Production ==
The album was produced by Johnny Sandlin, who called the band the best that he had heard. Hampton played his "chazoid", an instrument that resembled a combination of guitar and mandolin. He spent a month writing the songs for the album, after the band had finished touring behind their debut.

Béla Fleck and John Popper contributed to the album. "Trondossa" is built around the sound of a Hammond B-3.

== Critical reception ==
Professional ratings
Review scores
Source	Rating
AllMusic	4.5/5 stars
MusicHound Rock: The Essential Album Guide	3.5/5 stars
The State	4.5/5 stars

Stereo Review stated: "Just imagine it—a six-string-bass jazz/funk virtuoso, a mandolin phenom with avant-garde leanings, a guitarist who'd have been a Southern-rock hotshot in another context, and a four-armed drummer (or so it seems), all coming together in a sound that combines the brisk tandem runs of bluegrass, the improvisational aspects of jazz, and the dynamics of rock." The Washington Post determined that, "at times it's all a bit too clever and cluttered for its own good, but more often than not it evokes the open-ended possibilities that hippie-rock has often promised and rarely delivered."

The Star Tribune opined that, "if you married two great San Francisco Bay Area bands of the 1970s, Tower of Power and the Grateful Dead, the result might sound like the Aquarium Rescue Unit." The Telegram & Gazette noted that "the playing is spirited, the sentiment a little demented." The State declared that "Matt Mundy's mandolin dances with Jimmy Herring's speed-of-light guitar licks in some of this century's most bodacious Southern-fried fusion."

AllMusic wrote that the album was "relaxed, smart, fun music with big fat friendly shouter vocals from the Colonel."

== Track listing ==
No.	Title	Length
1.	"No Ego's Under Water"
2.	"Lost My Mule in Texas"
3.	"It's Not the Same Old Thing"
4.	"Too Many Guitars"
5.	"Gone Today, Here Tomorrow"
6.	"Shoeless Joe"
7.	"Lives of Longevity"
8.	"Memory Is a Gimmick"
9.	"Dead Presidents"
10.	"Trondossa"
11.	"Swing"
12.	"Payday"

== Personnel ==
- Col. Bruce Hampton – lead vocals, chazoid
- Jimmy Herring – guitar
- Matt Mundy – mandolin, vocals
- Oteil Burbridge – bass, vocals
- Jeff Sipe (listed as "Apt. Q258") – drums, vocals
- Count Mbutu – conga drums
- Chuck Leavell – piano (tracks 3 and 5)
- Béla Fleck – banjo (tracks 4 and 11)
- Oliver Wells – organ (tracks 1 and 10)
- John Popper – harmonica (track 2)
