= Ike Stubblefield =

American musician (1952–2021)

- Born: Isaac Larry Stubblefield; June 7, 1952; Toledo, Ohio, U.S.
- Died: June 20, 2021 (aged 69) Conyers, Georgia, U.S.
- Instrument: Hammond organ
- Years active: 1968 –2010

Isaac Larry Stubblefield (June 7, 1952 – June 20, 2021) was an American musician, who performed with a wide array of artists on Hammond B3 organ.

== Musical career ==
Born in Toledo, Ohio, Stubblefield started his career in 1968 playing keyboards with the Motown Review performers including the Four Tops, Martha Reeves, The Temptations, Marvin Gaye, Stevie Wonder and Rare Earth. He performed on stage on the Hammond B3 organ from 1970-1975 with George Benson, B.B. King, Ike & Tina Turner, Curtis Mayfield, Al Green, Eric Clapton, Rod Stewart, The Jerry Garcia Band, Johnny Adams, Bobby Caldwell, Boz Scaggs, Esther Phillips, The Pointer Sisters, and others. During that time, he lived in San Francisco, New York City and London.

From 1976-1988, Stubblefield worked as a studio musician, composer, songwriter and producer with artists including Quincy Jones, Phil Spector, Jim Capaldi, Wendy Waldman, Larry Lee, Allan Blazek, Kevin J. O'Brien, Esq. ('84-'88), Giorgio Moroder, Michael O'Hara, Allan Rich, Tom Whitlock, Bill Szymczyk, Tracie Spencer. He also scored music for films and T.V. projects including Best of the Best (1989), Summer Job, and commercials and shows for the BBC and CBC.

In 1990, Stubblefield moved to Vancouver, British Columbia, Canada, and opened The Purple Onion, a two-story warehouse club with three separate music venue rooms, where he performed with his band, Is Not Was, and hosted shows by Canadian and international artists. The club closed in 2004. In 1995, he moved to Seattle, reforming Is Not Was as a Hammond B3 organ quartet, performing at Jazz Alley and other venues in Seattle and Portland.

He moved back to his hometowns of Toledo and Detroit in 1997. After winning Two "People Choice Awards" for Jazz and R&B, he opened a club called Yikes Supper Club in Toledo, enlisting friends including Rodney Dangerfield to attend the opening. During the first year, organ musicians Jack McDuff, Joey DeFrancesco and Jimmy McGriff performed at the club, as well as Jenna Mammina and Dave McMurray.

In 2001, Stubblefield resurfaced in Atlanta, where he frequented Café 290, a jazz club in Sandy Springs. In Atlanta, Stubblefield performed at Variety Playhouse, The Roxy, The Dogwood Festival, and worked with Sonny Emory, Sam Skelton, Count M'Butu, The Derek Trucks Band, Jeff Sipe, Caroline Aiken, Jimmy Herring, Bruce Hampton, Bobby Lee Rodgers, The Codetalkers, Francine Reed, and Susan Tedeschi.

In 2004 he returned to Europe for an extended tour of Germany, Spain, France and England, as well as recording and producing with various artists. He returned to Atlanta in 2005 and was inducted into the city’s downtown Hard Rock Café Hall of Fame, with the first Hammond B3 to be displayed in any Hard Rock Café. He also replaced Billy Preston on organ during Eric Clapton's winter European tour.

In 2005 Stubblefield met David Neel, owner of a new club called The Blue Room, in the Buckhead area of Atlanta. Together they established the only Hammond B3 venue on the East Coast of the United States outside of New York City, with an opening show featuring drummer Bernard Purdie and the Groove Masters (Reuben Wilson on Hammond B3 organ and Grant Green Jr. on guitar).

In 2010 Stubblefield recorded organ and keyboards for nine tracks in a Cee Lo Green recording session. He then moved to Athens, Georgia, where he performed with Randall Bramblett, John Keane, and others. He co-produced and played on Michael Allman's Hard Labor Creek in 2009.

He died in 2021, aged 69, at his home in Conyers, Georgia, as a result of cancer.
