= Delete and Roll =

Studio album by BPM
- Released: 2002
- Genre: Jazz fusion
- Length: 63:46
- Label: Next Generation Enterprises - NGE

Alex Machacek chronology
Featuring Ourselves (1999)	Delete and Roll (2002)	Sic (2006)

Delete and Roll is a jazz fusion album by BPM, featuring drummer Terry Bozzio, saxophonist Gerald Preinfalk, and guitarist Alex Machacek. It was recorded in 2001, and was released in 2002 by Next Generation Enterprises.

== Reception ==
In a review for All About Jazz, Helmut Koch called the recording "an excellent crossover album at the fringe of jazz, fusion, avant-garde prog-rock and their numerous sub-genres," and wrote: "Delete and Roll is out and out off-mainstream, an interesting and adventurous amalgam of various musical influences and a brave statement of non-conformist creativity in general."

Modern Drummer's Mike Haid stated: "You'll find lots of notes on BPM's Delete and Roll, all of them splattered about lengthy and complex Zappa-style compositions... Bozzio shines as he goes deep into his huge kit."

== Track listing ==
1. "Dicht" (Machacek) - 8:38
2. "Strafe" (Machacek) - 8:18
3. "Austin Powers" (Machacek) - 8:09
4. "Invisible" (Preinfalk) - 5:42
5. "Aug Um Aug" (Machacek/Preinfalk) - 10:00
6. "Bulgarianish Folkdance" (Bozzio) - 3:00
7. "I Remember Edison" (Machacek/Preinfalk) - 8:27
8. "S150" (Machacek) - 9:01
9. "What She Never Heard" (Bozzio) - 2:21

== Personnel ==
- Gerald Preinfalk – bass clarinet, alto saxophone, soprano saxophone
- Alex Machacek – electric guitar, guitar synthesizer
- Terry Bozzio – drums, percussion
