= Oz Noy =

Israeli-American jazz guitarist and composer

Oz Noy עוז נוי
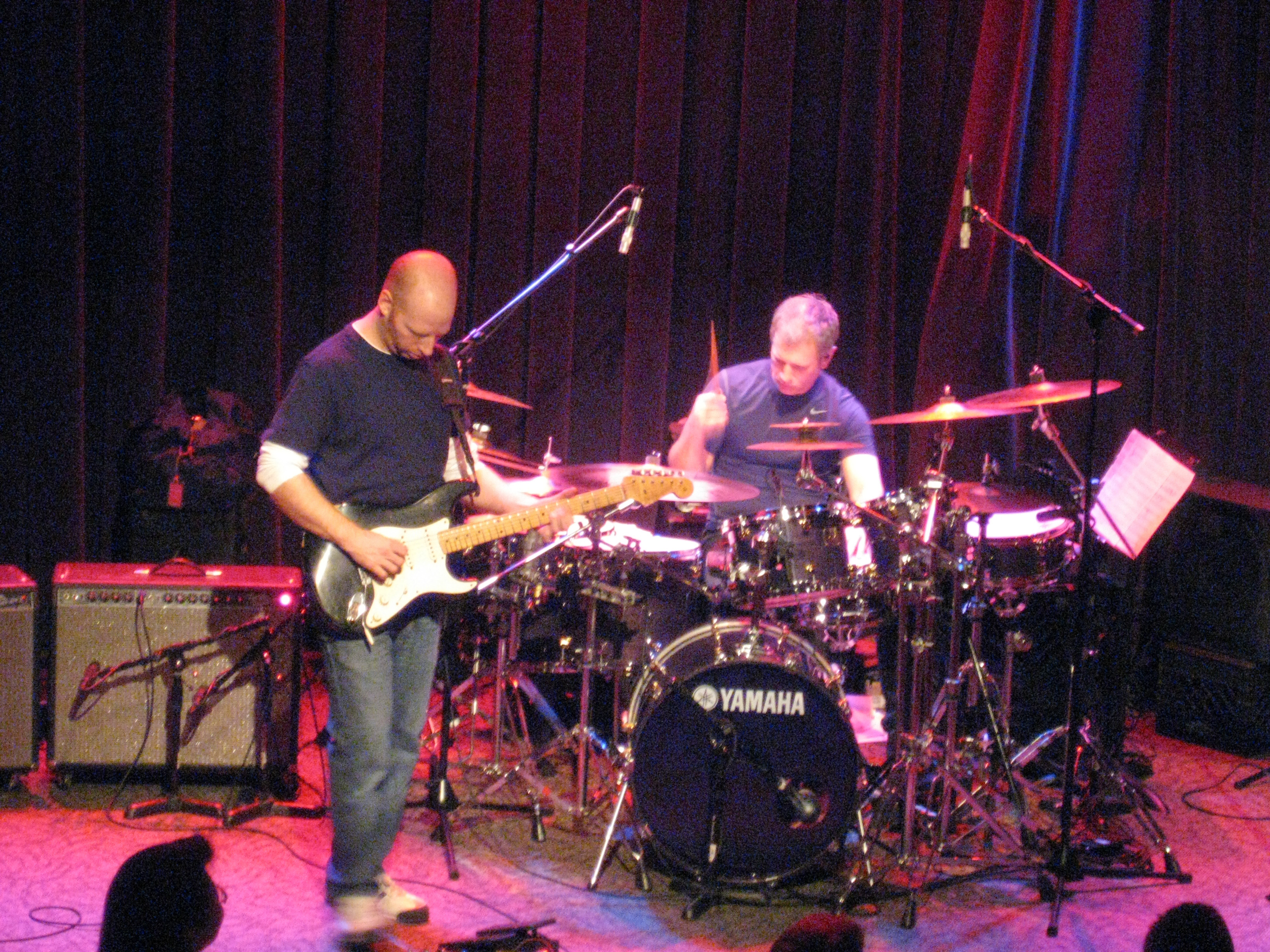
- Oz Noy performing with Dave Weckl at Jazz Alley (2011)

Background information
- Born: Oz Noy; 1972 (age 53–54)
- Origin: Tel Aviv, Israel
- Genres: Jazz rock • blues rock • funk rock • instrumental rock
- Occupation: Guitarist • composer
- Instrument: Guitar
- Years active: Early 1990s-present
- Label: Magna Carta Records • Abstract Logix • Criss Cross Jazz
- Website: https://www.oznoy.com

Oz Noy (Hebrew: עוז נוי; born 1972) is an Israeli-American guitarist and composer whose work blends jazz-rock fusion, blues, and funk. Based in New York City since the 1990s, he has released more than ten albums as a bandleader on labels including Magna Carta, Abstract Logix, and Criss Cross Jazz. In addition to his solo work, he has performed and recorded extensively as a sideman. Noy was voted Best New Talent in 2009 and Best “Out There” Guitarist in 2013 in Guitar Player magazine’s annual polls.

== Career ==
Originally from Rishon LeZion, Israel, Noy began performing in Tel Aviv at a young age, and by his early twenties, was working regularly as a studio musician. He was also part of the house band on the popular television show Rashut Habidur (The Entertainment Authority), hosted by Dudu Topaz. He relocated to New York City in 1996 and soon began attracting notice from established jazz musicians, including Will Lee and Anton Fig, the rhythm section from the CBS Late Show band. He developed a reputation for a progressive and iconoclastic guitar style, and became a fixture in the city's instrumental scene, maintaining weekly residency at Greenwich Village's The Bitter End and appearing frequently across the downtown jazz-fusion circuit.

It was at The Bitter End that Noy recorded his debut album, Oz Live (2003), over the course of three nights. The album featured alternating trio lineups with bassists Will Lee, James Genus, and Reggie Washington, and drummers Anton Fig and Keith Carlock. The debut was met with critical acclaim, and was followed by his first studio album, Ha! (2005), which featured a guest appearance by guitarist Mike Stern. Noy promoted the release with a headlining performance at Iridium Jazz Club, a venue he has frequented since.

He released two more albums on Magna Carta Records: Fuzzy (2007) and Schizophrenic (2009) and in 2011, he joined Abstract Logix, beginning with Twisted Blues Vol. 1.

After a series of releases, Noy's eleventh album, Triple Play (2023), was recorded live at Stages Music Arts in Maryland with Jimmy Haslip and Dennis Chambers. In 2024, he debuted on the Criss Cross Jazz label with Fun One, an album combining jazz standards and original compositions arranged for a straight-ahead jazz quartet.

As a session and touring guitarist, Noy has performed or recorded with artists such as [Vinnie Colaiuta], [Dave Weckl], Gavin DeGraw, Clay Aiken, Roger Glover, Idina Menzel, Cyndi Lauper, Harry Belafonte, Toni Braxton, Al Kooper, and Eric Revis—The New York Times described Noy’s “barbed-wire electric guitar” on Revis’s 2004 album Tales of the Stuttering Mime as evoking the raw edge of Link Wray.

== Reception ==
Critics have described Noy as an original guitarist with John Kelman of All About Jazz citing his fusion of “visceral groove, inventive melody, and an effervescent energy.”

Noy's recordings have received attention from a range of music publications. Guitar Player described his studio album Ha! as "one of the most enjoyable instrumental guitar records in recent memory," comparing it to Jeff Beck’s Blow by Blow. Bill Meredith of JazzTimes praised Fuzzy as a release in which the guitarist "saves some of his most unique ideas for two brilliant cover arrangements." Schizophrenic was described by All About Jazz as "a more overtly jazz-centric affair" balancing groove and harmonic complexity. The magazine later praised Twisted Blues Vol. 1 for its "funky, jam-worthy tunes." JazzTimes took a more critical view of Schizophrenic, describing the album as "wholly predictable."

Bill Milkowski, writing in DownBeat, highlighted the stylistic range of Asian Twistz. Relix described his trio on Triple Play as demonstrating "looseness and chemistry," and noted Noy’s "signature touch regardless of the setting." DownBeat emphasized the album’s "bold, neo-fusion energy," while Cadence cited its compositional depth. In a 2024 review, Jazz Journal called Noy a "take-no-prisoners guitarist," and noted a more reflective tone on tracks from Fun One. The Boston Globe described his sound as "jazz that rocks," citing his ability to move between genres and playing styles.

== Selected discography ==
=== As leader ===
- Oz Live! (Magna Carta, 2003; re-release 2006)
- Ha! (Magna Carta, 2005)
- Fuzzy (Magna Carta, 2007)
- Schizophrenic (Magna Carta, 2009)
- Twisted Blues - Vol. 1 (Abstract Logix, 2011)
- Asian Twistz (Abstract Logix, 2015)
- Who Gives a Funk (Abstract Logix, 2016)
- Booga Looga Loo (Abstract Logix, 2019)
- Snapdragon (Abstract Logix, 2020)
- Triple Play (Abstract Logix, 2023)
- Fun One (Criss Cross Jazz, 2024)

=== As sideman ===
- Richard Bona: Reverence (Columbia, 2001)
- Gavin DeGraw: Chariot Stripped (J Records, 2003); Chariot 20 (Sony Music, 2024)
- Anton Fig: Figments (Planula, 2007)
- Clay Aiken: On My Way Here (RCA, 2008)
- Roger Glover: If Life Was Easy (Eagle Records, 2011)
- Tommy Bolin & Friends: Great Gypsy Soul (Cleopatra, 2012)
- Betty Buckley: Story Songs (Palmetto+, 2017)
- Idina Menzel: idina: live (Arts Music, 2018)
