= In a Perfect World (Aquarium Rescue Unit album) =

Studio album by Aquarium Rescue Unit
- Released: November 8, 1994 (US) (CD); March 4, 1996 (re-release)
- Studio: Southern Living At Its Finest Studio (Atlanta, Georgia)
- Genre: Rock, southern rock, blues-rock
- Length: 55:33
- Label: Velvet Dwarf Records, Intersound Records
- Producer: Ricky Keller and The Aquarium Rescue Unit

Aquarium Rescue Unit chronology
Mirrors of Embarrassment (1993)	In a Perfect World (1994)	The Calling (2003)

In a Perfect World is a 1994 studio album by the Aquarium Rescue Unit. It was the band's second studio album, and their first record following the departure of former frontman Bruce Hampton.

== Reception ==
Professional ratings
Review scores
Source	Rating
AllMusic	2/5 stars
The Rolling Stone Jazz & Blues Album Guide	4/5 stars

In a review for AllMusic, JT Griffith wrote: "The album is packed with some great jams and beautiful sounds," but noted that although it "probably translated well live," "on record the band falls flat."

John Swenson, editor of The Rolling Stone Jazz & Blues Album Guide, awarded the album 4 stars, calling it "a burnished fusion effort featuring magnificent performances from Herring and Oteil Burbridge."

Writer Dean Budnick commented: "The level of musicianship is quite high on this disc... Burbridge is... creative and compelling... Herring distinguishes himself on a number of tunes."

No Treble's Ryan Madora praised Burbridge's playing on "The Garden," stating that he "exhibits impeccable technique," and "uses clever interval leaps and chords during the flute solo, only to give way to a fierce and acutely punctuated groove before returning to the original theme."

== Track listing ==
1. "Search Yourself" (Henson, Herring) – 5:58
2. "Stand up People" (Ingram) – 4:58
3. "How Tight's Yer Drawers" (Henson, Herring) – 3:50
4. "The Garden" (Bubridge, Henson) – 5:04
5. "Swallows" (Bubridge, Bubridge, Henson) – 5:12
6. "Headstrong" (Henson, Herring) – 4:25
7. "Plain or Peanut" (Burbridge) – 2:25
8. "Highly Overrated" (Burbridge, Burbridge, Henson) – 4:33
9. "Overload" (Burbridge, Henson) – 5:46
10. "Satisfaction Guaranteed" (Baird) – 4:03
11. "Turn It On" (Burbridge, Henson) – 4:34
12. "Splash" (Burbridge) – 4:12

== Personnel ==
- Jeff Sipe / Apt. Q258 – drums, percussion, "Harmonorbital", Kelnabor, Crontex, Strohgen
- Oteil Burbridge – 5- and 6-string bass
- Kofi Burbridge – flute, keyboards, acoustic piano
- Paul Henson – lead vocals
- Jimmy Herring – guitar, guitar synthesizer
- Count M'Butu – percussion
- Beth Harris – backing vocals on "Overload"
- Lincoln Metcalf – Chazoid
