= Project Z (album) =

Studio album by Project Z
- Released: 2001
- Studios: Southern Living At Its Finest, Atlanta, Georgia
- Genre: Jazz fusion
- Length: 54:16
- Labels: Terminus Records; 0008-2
- Producers: Jimmy Herring, Ricky Keller, Jeff Sipe

Project Z chronology
Project Z (2001)	Lincoln Memorial (2005)

Project Z is the debut album by the band of the same name. It was recorded at Southern Living At Its Finest in Atlanta, Georgia, and was released in 2001 by Terminus Records. On the album, core Project Z members Jimmy Herring (guitar), Ricky Keller (bass), and Jeff Sipe (drums) are joined by guest artists Rev. Oliver Wells (keyboards), Derek Trucks (slide guitar), Count M'Butu (congas), and Col. Bruce Hampton ("Z Phone").

According to AllMusic's Ann Wickstrom, the recording documented a session in which "top-drawer musicians who favor improvisation are given no boundaries, rules, restraints, pressures, or expectations... Terminus told the artists they could record anything they wanted to and it would be released." Herring recalled that the project was "about the lack of songs," with the goal being "to see how far we could get without songs. Just pure improvisation."

== Reception ==
Professional ratings
Review scores
Source	Rating
AllMusic	4.5/5 stars
Jambands: The Complete Guide to the Players, Music, & Scene	4/5 stars

In a review for AllMusic, Ann Wickstrom wrote: "The intrinsic communication between the three musicians is staggering... Highly recommended."

Author Dean Budnick stated that the band "perpetuates the musical ethos that is the essence of Zambi," Bruce Hampton's term for "approaching music in the moment, without ego." He described the album as "a constant flow of music," and noted that "Herring and Sipe are in fine fettle, with Keller a capable running buddy."

== Track listing ==
1. "Raging Torrent" – 3:59
2. "Guitargument I" – 0:24
3. "Mud Bug" – 6:23
4. "Extra Cold" – 0:16
5. "Augusta's Ankle" – 4:23
6. "Psychic Flutter" – 0:18
7. "Rainbow" – 5:23
8. "Guitargument II" – 0:12
9. "Albright Special" – 2:47
10. "The Third Man" – 0:18
11. "Genetic Drift" – 1:42
12. "Yachtz" – 7:20
13. "Guitargument III" – 0:33
14. "Utensil Oceans" – 4:29
15. "She Freak" – 0:30
16. "Jean" – 0:40
17. "Separated Gestures" – 6:54
18. "Isolated Light" – 7:36

== Personnel ==
- Jimmy Herring – electric guitar, acoustic guitar
- Ricky Keller – bass, disease piano
- Jeff Sipe – drums, percussion, underwater devices
- Rev. Oliver Wells – organ, piano, synthesizer
- Derek Trucks – slide guitar
- Count M'Butu – congas
- Col. Bruce Hampton – Z Phone
