= Gerald Preinfalk =

Austrian saxophonist (born 1971)

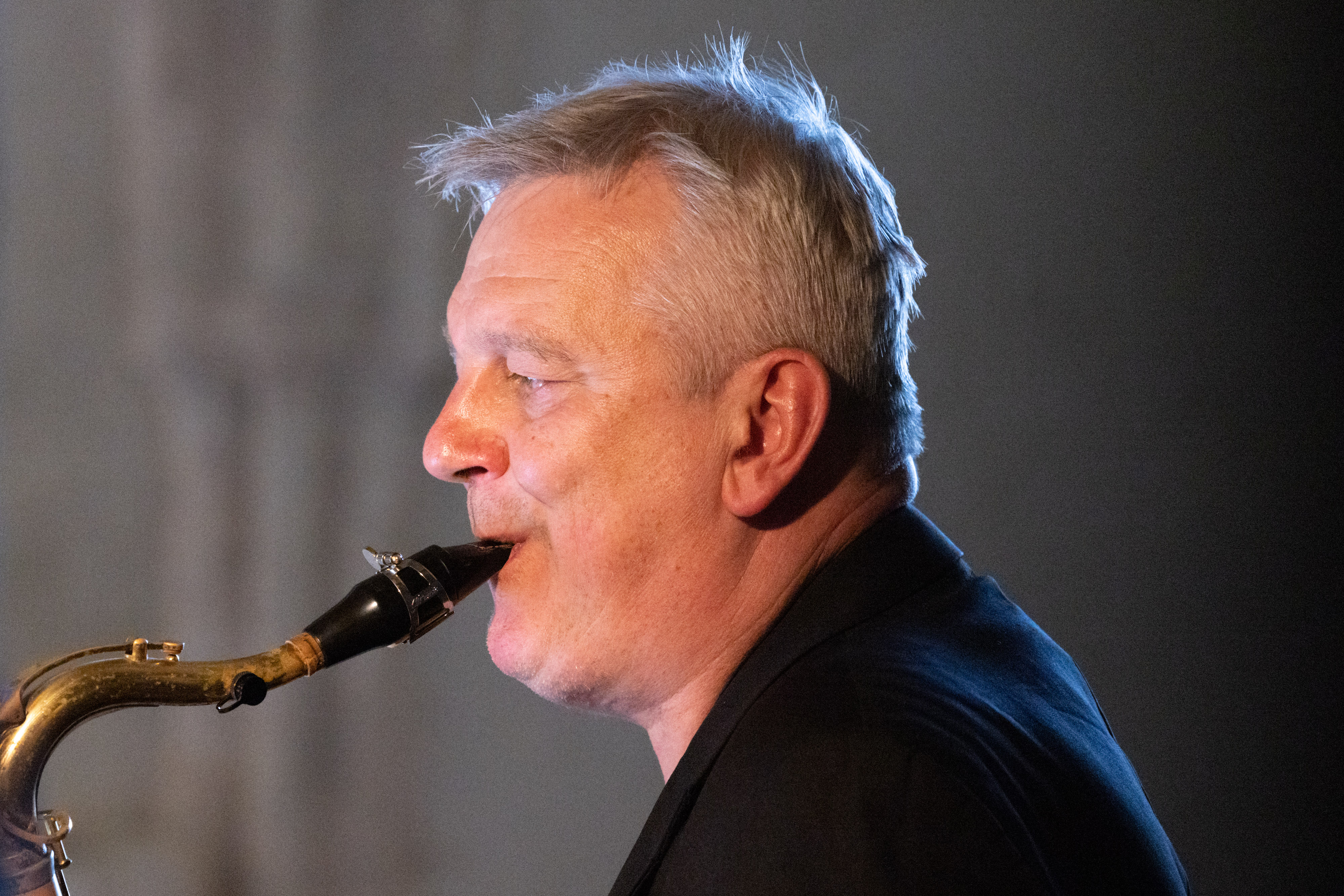

Background information
- Born: Gerald Franz Preinfalk; 9 June 1971 (age 55); Freistadt, Austria
- Genres: Jazz, classical
- Occupations: Musician, composer
- Instruments: Saxophone, clarinet
- Years active: 1990–present
- Member of: Klangforum Wien
- Website: www.gerald-preinfalk.at

Gerald Franz Preinfalk (9 June 1971 in Freistadt, Austria) is an Austrian jazz and classical saxophonist and clarinetist.

== Biography ==
Preinfalk started taking clarinet lessons at age 9, and started playing saxophone at 15. In 1990 he began the instrumental studies at the Universität für Musik und darstellende Kunst Wien with Otto Vhrovnik and Wolfgang Puschnig. In 1993 he continued his studies at the Berklee College of Music with George Garzone, and in 1998 he studied classical saxophone at Serge Bertocchi in Paris.

Since 2000 Preinfalk has been a member of Klangforum Wien, with guest performances with orchestras such as the Vienna Radio Symphony Orchestra, the Staatsphilharmonie Rheinland Pfalz and the Staatsorchester Stuttgart. He has also appeared as a performer of contemporary music with the "Ensemble xx. jahrhundert" and the "Ensemble Kontrapunkte". Bernhard Lang wrote a solo concert with the Vienna Symphony Orchestra for Preinfalk, in addition to chamber music by Roland Freisitzer (2011) and Norbert Sterk (2008) composed for him.

In the jazz genre, he has played with Django Bates, Peter Madsen, Don Byron, Terry Bozzio, Alex Machacek, Georg Breinschmid, Harri Stojka, the "Flip Philipp - Ed Partyka Dectet" and the "Yodelgroup" of Christian Muthspiel. He was part of big bands like "Nouvelle Cuisine", the "Upper Austrian Jazz Orchestra", the "Jazz Big Band Graz" and the Vienna Art Orchestra. Preinfalk's own musical projects are the Paier/Preinfalk Project with Klaus Paier (2000), More than Tango und Saion (2004), Tan Go Go (2005) and the Giuffre Zone, where he, Christoph Cech and Per Mathisen interpreted the music of Jimmy Giuffre. Most of these projects have been documented on tape. Since 2007, he also appeared in a duo with Brazilian guitarist Alegre Corrêa, which was occasionally extended in various occupations. He is also a part of the Alegre Corrêa Sextet, alongside Corrêa, Alune Wade, Fagner Wesley, Matheus Jardim, and Bertl Mayer. As a studio musician he worked with Willi Resetarits and Maria Bill. He has also worked with Savina Yannatou, Lucía Pulido, Kurt Ostbahn and Krzysztof Dobrek. Tom Lord lists 27 shots 1993–2012 in the field of Jazz.

Preinfalk also acted as a theater composer. For the Wiener Volkstheater he wrote the music to "Peer Gynt", "Job" and "You stay with me", each directed by Michael Sturminger. He also arranged Jewish songs with lyrics from poets murdered by Stalin's regime in 1952 ("Moscow 52", "Bukovina III").

2011 Preinfalk was appointed as a university professor of saxophone at the Kunstuniversität Graz.

== Honors ==
- 2001: Awarded the Hans Koller prize as "Newcomer of the Year" in the Jazz genre.

== Discography ==
=== Solo albums ===
- 2003: Tan Go Go (Quinton Records)
- 2014: Art Of Duo (col legno), with Alegre Corrêa, Wolfgang Muthspiel, Per Mathisen, Fabian Rucker, Christoph Cech and Harri Stojka

=== Collaborations ===
- 1997: Trash Test (Extraplatte), with Duckbilled Platypus
- 1999: Duck You! (Extraplatte), with Duckbilled Platypus
- 2002: Delete and Roll (Next Generation Enterprises), with Terry Bozzio and Alex Machacek
- 2007: Opium (FP Records), with Flip Philipp - Ed Partyka Dectet
- 2010: May (Material Records), with Christian Muthspiel's Yodel Group
