= Croakin' at Toad's =

Live album by Frogwings
- Released: 2000
- Venues: Toad's Place, New Haven, Connecticut; The Wetlands, New York, New York
- Genre: Rock
- Length: 1:15:42
- Labels: Flying Frog Records; FFR-01-003
- Producers: Butch Trucks, John Snyder

Croakin' at Toad's is a live album by jam band supergroup Frogwings. The group's sole release, it was recorded at Toad's Place in New Haven, Connecticut and The Wetlands in New York, New York, and was released on CD in 2000 by Butch Trucks' label Flying Frog Records. The album features John Popper on harmonica and vocals, Jimmy Herring and Derek Trucks on guitar, Kofi Burbridge on keyboards and flute, Oteil Burbridge on bass, Marc Quinones on percussion, and Butch Trucks on drums.

== Reception ==
Professional ratings
Review scores
Source	Rating
AllMusic	2.5/5 stars
Jambands: The Complete Guide to the Players, Music, & Scene	4.5/5 stars

In a review for AllMusic, Brian Beatty wrote: "None of Croakin' at Toad's' eight songs is anything more than an excuse for extended, indulgent soloing. Imagine a Santana rehearsal from the early '70s with a stoned Toots Thielemans sitting in on harp... Maybe you had to be there, like back in the '70s." In a separate AllMusic review, Bill Meredith commented: "The blazing Herring and youthful Trucks... blend their strengths nicely; Popper and bassist Burbridge... provide additional firepower," while the other musicians "man the foundation for an uncategorizable jam band for the new millennium."

Writer Dean Budnick praised the group's "charged, often boundless playing," and stated: "The band crackles on this release... The dynamic between guitarists Herring and Trucks is worth the price of admission alone, but the rhythm section is propulsive."

Rob Evanoff, writing for All About Jazz, remarked: "if you like a mix of blistering guitar, soul-vibrating bass, pulverizing drums, heated percussion, blowin' harp and pulsating keyboards whose culmination will make you close your eyes, wince your mouth and waver your skull as if you're being riddled with razor sharp musical bullets, then you'll be Croakin' in your pants, the same way the lucky few who were on hand at Toad's did."

Robin Rothman of CMJ New Music Monthly stated: "the band sounds more or less like you'd expect given the personnel... The playing is air-tight."

In an article for The Aspen Times, Stewart Oksenhorn called the album "remarkably tight," and commented: "With Croakin' at Toad's, Frogwings dares anyone to call their music noodling, that condescending term laid on rock bands that rely more on instrumental interaction than concise, lyric-driven songs... there is a dense rhythmic aspect to the music, bringing in jazz, rock and Latin grooves. And it's just impossible to say that the music goes nowhere, not with soloists who have as much to say as these guys do."

George Graham described Croakin' at Toad's as "a great live album marked by solid playing and the kind of musical interaction that makes a jam band performance so memorable... an album that should not be missed by the jam band fan."

== Track listing ==
1. "Kick n Bach" (Jimmy Herring, John Herbert, Oteil Burbridge) – 13:59
2. "Hurdy Gurdy Fandango" (John Popper) – 5:33
3. "Pattern" (John Popper, Oteil Burbridge) – 6:24
4. "Eddie's Got a Boyfriend" (Oteil Burbridge, Jimmy Herring) – 16:10
5. "Just One" (John Popper) – 9:53
6. "Ganja" (Frogwings) – 7:57
7. "Deviant Dreams" (Oteil Burbridge, John Popper) – 9:18
8. "Among Your Pillows" (Kofi Burbridge, Oteil Burbridge, John Popper) – 6:30

== Personnel ==
Musicians

- Kofi Burbridge – keyboards, flute
- Oteil Burbridge – bass
- Jimmy Herring – guitar
- John Popper – harp (harmonica), vocals
- Marc Quinones – percussion
- Butch Trucks – drums
- Derek Trucks – slide guitar

Production

- Produced by Butch Trucks and John Snyder
- Engineering, mixing: John Snyder
- Mastering: Vlado Meller
- Assistant engineers: Bruce Judd, Marty Wall, Mark Withrow, Eric Kerber, Caleb Snyder
- Cover illustration: Melinda Trucks
- Package design: Brian Kelly
