= Frogwings =

American band (1997–2003)

- Origin: Georgia, US
- Genres: Rock, Jam rock
- Years active: 1997–2003
- Label: Flying Frog
- Past members: Butch Trucks; Kofi Burbridge; Oteil Burbridge; Jimmy Herring; Derek Trucks; John Popper; Marc Quinones; John Herbert; Count Mbutu; Edwin McCain

Frogwings was an American rock band supergroup founded by Allman Brothers Band drummer Butch Trucks. Despite the fact that they were popular on the jam band circuit and at festivals, the group released only one album.

== Background ==
In mid-1997, during a break in the Allman Brothers Band's schedule, Butch Trucks decided to put together a side project that would enable him to play with his nephew, guitarist Derek Trucks, who was then in his late teens. Butch Trucks recalled: "I've wanted to get in a situation where I could do more than just jam with him once every other year. A group like this seemed like the right vehicle... I always wanted to do this with Derek and I knew if I didn't, I'd regret it." He also invited Aquarium Rescue Unit guitarist Jimmy Herring, one of Derek Trucks' mentors, to join, and Herring in turn recommended ARU bassist Oteil Burbridge. Rounding out the original incarnation of the group were ARU percussionist Count Mbutu, Allman Brothers percussionist Marc Quinones, keyboardist John Herbert, and vocalist and guitarist Edwin McCain.

The band played concerts through the remainder of 1997. The following year, Herbert left and was replaced by Kofi Burbridge, and Mbutu also departed. In 1999, Blues Traveler front man John Popper replaced McCain as lead vocalist when McCain's label would not allow him to continue to participate. According to Butch Trucks, this change resulted in music that had "a lot harder edge," and that was "a lot more rock 'n' roll oriented." The following year, the group released their only album, Croakin' at Toad's, recorded live at Toad's Place in New Haven, Connecticut, and released on Butch Trucks' Flying Frog label. Frogwings also performed at the First Annual Jammy Awards that year, with Susan Tedeschi as vocalist.

Given the musicians' commitments, the group continued as a sporadic side project. (Oteil Burbridge and Derek Trucks had both joined the Allman Brothers on a full-time basis, Burbridge in 1997 and Trucks in 1999, while Herring toured with the Allmans in 2000.) Butch Trucks reflected: "What's really fun about Frogwings is that there's really no pressure at all. We're all making a living doing other things, and this we do plain and simply for the fun of it... We can carve a few weeks out of the year to do it."

According to Butch Trucks, the name Frogwings came from "an old story" in which a person lamenting their regrets in life is told "Yeah, well if a frog had wings, he wouldn't bust ass every time he jumped." Trucks stated that, to him, the name is "a symbol of no regrets... If you want to do something, just do it."

== Legacy ==
Author Dean Budnick called Frogwings "the band that's short only on originals but long on chops, long on jams, long on just about everything." AllMusic's Bill Meredith described them as "an uncategorizable jam band for the new millennium." Stewart Oksenhorn, writing for The Aspen Times, commented: "Frogwings just might be the finest jam band ever assembled," while Robin Rothman of CMJ New Music Monthly called the band "a genuine jam-circuit powerhouse."

== Discography ==
- Croakin' at Toad's (Flying Frog Records, 2000)
