= Lincoln Memorial (album) =

Studio album by Project Z
- Released: 2005
- Recorded: March 2002
- Studios: ZAC Recording Studio, Atlanta, Georgia
- Genre: Jazz fusion
- Length: 1:13:30
- Labels: Abstract Logix; ABLX-001
- Producer: Project

Project Z chronology
Project Z (2001)	Lincoln Memorial (2005)

Lincoln Memorial is the second album by Project Z. It was recorded in March 2002 at ZAC Recording Studio in Atlanta, Georgia, and was released in 2005 by Abstract Logix. On the album, core Project Z members Jimmy Herring (guitar), Ricky Keller (bass), and Jeff Sipe (drums) are joined by guest artists Greg Osby (saxophone) and Jason Crosby (keyboards).

The album is dedicated to Ricky Keller, who died in June 2003, and who had been given the nickname "Lincoln Metcalf" by Col. Bruce Hampton.

== Reception ==
Professional ratings
Review scores
Source	Rating
All About Jazz	4/5 stars

In a review for All About Jazz, David Miller wrote: "this is no jamband record. At its core is jazz; the communication between the musicians is astonishing at times... This is the album that Herring has always had the potential to make, combining all of his diverse influences into a cohesive musical statement."

A review for Leeway's Homegrown Music Network called the album "a milestone among recorded sessions of free improvisation," and stated: "what sets Lincoln Memorial apart is the context and musical experience of the musicians... These are musicians of the caliber that listeners will want to hear how they interact in the most daring and vulnerable setting possible--and there are very few if any deliberate or false steps in the mix." He concluded: "Few recorded electric band excursions into free improvisation since Weather Report or King Crimson have produced such a powerful and whimsical result."

== Track listing ==
1. "Departure" – 4:06
2. "Miso Soup" – 6:22
3. "Stale Salt Lugs" – 6:42
4. "Freener Frolic" – 6:38
5. "You Do" – 8:04
6. "Sister Barbie" – 5:06
7. "Slaif" – 5:11
8. "Sad Sack" – 4:04
9. "'Ol Bugaboo" – 5:12
10. "Zamb Fear" – 4:00
11. "Microburst" – 7:20
12. "Lincoln Memorial" – 5:26
13. "Arrival" – 5:19

== Personnel ==
- Jimmy Herring – guitar
- Ricky Keller – bass
- Jeff Sipe – drums
- Greg Osby – alto saxophone
- Jason Crosby – keyboards
