= Sic (album) =

[Sic]

Studio album by Alex Machacek
- Released: 15 August 2006
- Genre: Jazz-fusion
- Length: 54:52
- Label: Abstract Logix
- Producer: Alex Machacek

Alex Machacek chronology
Delete and Roll (2002)	[Sic] (2006)	Improvision (2007)

[Sic] is a jazz-fusion album released in 2006 by Austrian guitarist Alex Machacek. The album features drummer Terry Bozzio.

== Reception ==
Professional ratings
Review scores
Source	Rating
AllMusic	4.5/5 stars
All About Jazz	5/5 stars

In a review for AllMusic, Ken Dryden wrote: "The music throughout [Sic] is quite impressive, easily eclipsing most of what passes for instrumental rock or jazz fusion. Highly recommended."

Writing for All About Jazz, John Kelman stated: "Machacek's remarkable blend of advanced composition, masterful technique, and total musicality makes [Sic], quite simply, an instant classic that transcends genre-typing, and one of the best records of the year."

After listening to the album, guitarist John McLaughlin said: "Alex Machacek's music starts where other music ends."

== Track listing ==
All tracks composed by Alex Machacek.

1. "[sic]" – 5:43
2. "Indian Girl (Meets Austrian Boy)" – 8:18
3. "Miss Understanding" – 1:19
4. "Yellow Pages" – 6:16
5. "Djon Don" – 9:06
6. "Piano" – 6:34
7. "Out of Pappenheim" – 7:48
8. "Austin Powers" – 6:04
9. "Ballad of the Dead Dog" – 3:44

== Personnel ==
Musicians

- Herbert Pirker – drums (tracks: 4, 6, 8, 9)
- Mario Lackner – drums (tracks: 7)
- Terry Bozzio – drums (tracks: 1, 2, 5)
- Raphael Preuschl – electric upright bass (tracks: 3, 4, 6, 8, 9)
- Alex Machacek – guitar
- Sumitra Nanjundan – vocals (track 2)
- Randy Allar – voice (track 1)

Other credits

- Souvik Dutta – executive producer
- Bob Katz – mastering
- Alex Machacek, Jörg Mayr – mixing
- Alex Machacek – producer
