= Jag Star =

- Also known as: JagStar, Jag*Star
- Origin: Knoxville, Tennessee, USA
- Genres: Alternative rock, pop
- Members: Sarah Lewis; Brad Williams; Just J Drew Gilch; Jay Daniel
- Website: http://www.jagstar.com

Jag Star (just a girl singing to a radio) is an alternative pop group from Knoxville, Tennessee. Originally formed in 1999, the band has released five independent records, toured 14 countries, shared the stage with major artists like Dashboard Confessional, Joan Jett, Lifehouse, Michelle Branch, Macy Gray, Jordan Knight, and was featured on MTV's The Hills soundtrack (the only independent band)! The group has seen several line up changes and has toured extensively since 2000. Of the original line up listed on the band’s first EP “The Beginning”, only Sarah and J Lewis remain. Erin (Tipton) Archer, violist, was an original member but left the band in 2003 shortly after she married. The first line up included Sarah Lewis (lead vocals, songwriter, keys), Just J(guitar), Brad Williams (drums), and Jay Daniel (Bass). Sarah is a signed songwriter to a publishing company, has won several songwriting competitions, and has had many songs featured all over television, including NBC, ABC Family, FOX, Lifetime, Disney, MTV, A & E, Travel, etc.

== Awards ==
Lead singer/songwriter Sarah Lewis has won a number of awards including the overall winner in both the 2002 USA songwriting competition for the song “Mouth”, and the 2006 We Are Listening competition for the song “Does Anybody Know”. She was runner up in the 2001 John Lennon Songwriting Contest, and winner of the 2007 Next Big Hit competition, which landed Jag Star a week’s feature on iTunes. In 2007 Sarah was also chosen as a "Wet 'n Wild Fresh Face" and was featured in the company's beauty product national advertising campaign.

== AFE Military Tours ==
Jag Star has completed three AFE tours in support of the United States and Coalition Troops. These tours included a Middle Eastern tour and Southeast Asian tour in 2003, and Guantanamo Bay, Cuba in 2007. Countries that the band performed concerts in for Armed Forces Entertainment include Afghanistan, Pakistan, Qatar, Bahrain, Kyrgyzstan, Singapore, Guam, Diego Garcia, Kwajalein, and Guantanamo Bay.

== Discography ==
- 2000 The Beginning (The Orchard)
- 2002 Crazy Place (Lewpis Music)
- 2004 Cinematic (Lewpis Music)
- 2006 The Best Impression of Sanity
- 2009 Static Bliss
