= Alex Machacek =

Austrian jazz fusion guitarist

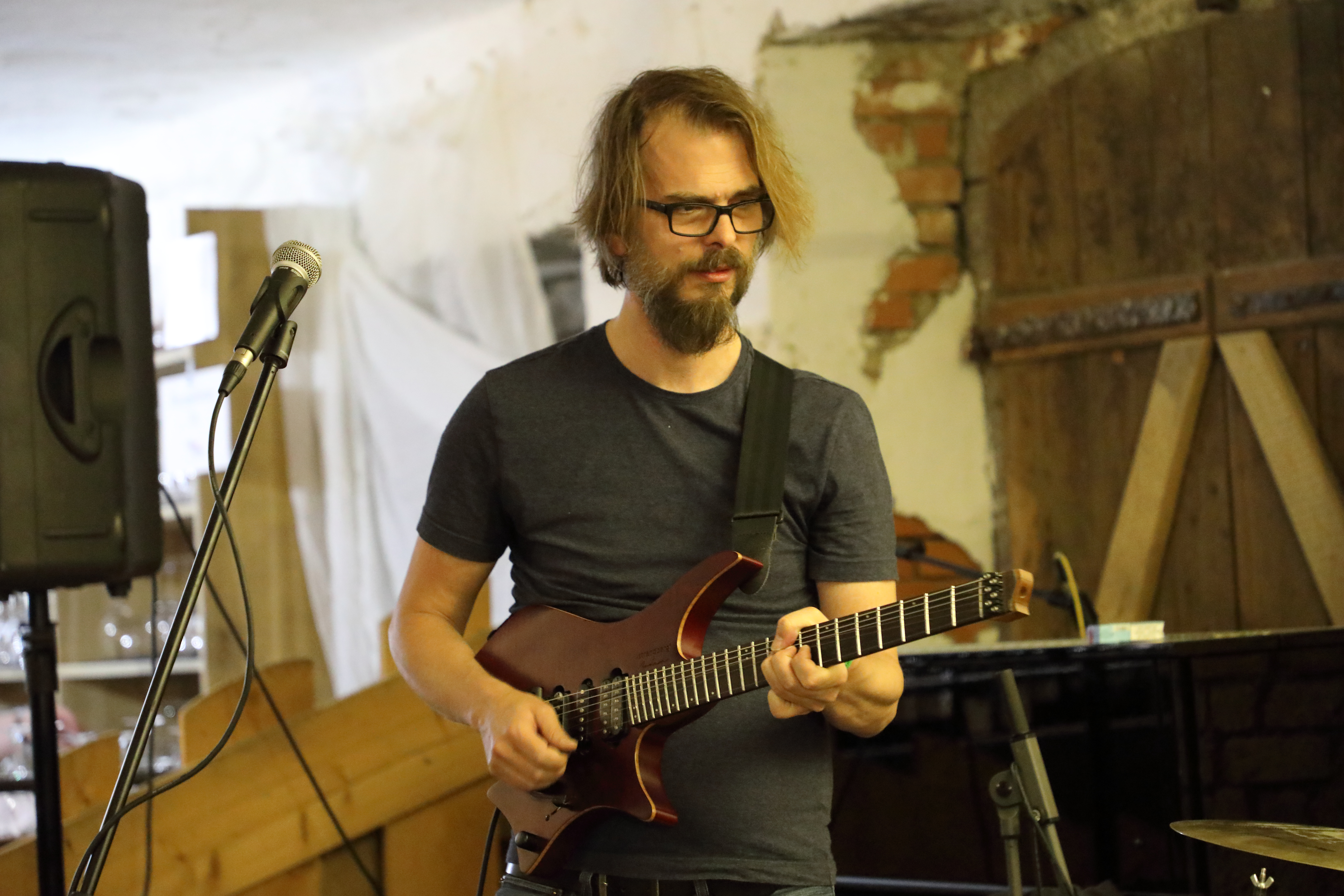

Background information
- Born: 1 July 1972 (age 54); Tulln an der Donau, Austria
- Genres: Jazz, jazz fusion, experimental, progressive rock
- Occupation: Musician
- Instrument: Guitar
- Years active: 1990s–present
- Label: Abstract Logix
- Website: www.alexmachacek.com

Alex Machacek (born 1 July 1972, Tulln an der Donau, Austria) is an Austrian jazz fusion guitarist.

== Early years ==
Machacek was born to a Czech family in Tulln, Austria. His family had moved to Austria in the 1960s as refugees. Since then, they have adopted Austria as their nation. He started playing the guitar at the age of eight by taking classical guitar lessons for six years at a music school in Vienna.

Machacek's early influences were heavy metal musicians and bands such as Iron Maiden, Kiss, Deep Purple and Queen. However, in the mid-1980s, he was attracted to the music of Mike Stern, John Scofield, Allan Holdsworth, Frank Zappa, Chick Corea and John McLaughlin. He stated that he is influenced by all the music that he liked, including heavy metal and hard rock.

== Music career ==
Machacek studied jazz guitar and jazz education at the Conservatory of Vienna, Austria. He took classical lessons in percussion. After that, he attended Berklee College of Music in Boston for two semesters. He won the European guitar competition Guitar Newcomer 98.

His first album, Featuring Ourselves, was released in 1999. He then met his idol, drummer Terry Bozzio. They collaborated on Delete and Roll as the band BPM. The album had elements of avant garde jazz, jazz fusion, and progressive rock. Music critics compared the music to the complex rhythms of Frank Zappa and the atmospheric guitar synth backdrops of ECM albums. The albums contain many legato guitar solos.

[Sic] was released in 2005. His wife Sumitra Nanjundan sings on "Indian Girl".

Machacek has toured as the Fabulous Austrian Trio (FAT) with bassist Raphael Preuschl and drummer Herbert Pirker. They have collaborated with Mario Lackner. In 2007, he was a founding member of UKZ with Eddie Jobson and Trey Gunn. He has also played in Planet X, which toured in Greece and Armenia in November 2008, and with the Virgil Donati Band. Machacek has taught at Musicians Institute in Los Angeles. Machacek played with Brand X on the Cruise to the Edge 2019. Machacek is currently the substitute guitarist for John Goodsall of Brand X for all tours outside of the US. Machacek occasionally plays with the fusion band CAB led by bassist Bunny Brunel & Scott Kinsey former keyboardist from the fusion band Tribal Tech.

In August 2026, it was announced that Machacek would be joining Eddie Jobson, Marc Bonilla, and Marco Minnemann in Jobson's "U.K. Revisited" for three U.S. tour dates in October 2026 (Los Angeles, Chicago, and New York), followed by seven January 2027 tour dates in Europe (Poland, Norway, Sweden, and the Netherlands).

== Personal life ==
In 2005 Machacek married Sumitra Nanjundan, an Indian American, after having worked with her for eight years. He produced her solo album Indian Girl. He visited India in 2005 to perform as part of an annual jazz festival.

== Praise for Alex Machacek ==
He has been praised by John McLaughlin, Allan Holdsworth, and Shawn Lane for his innovative style and the ease with which he shifts from legato to staccato. McLaughlin said, "Alex Machacek's music starts where other music ends".

== Discography ==
- Featuring Ourselves (Next Generation Enterprises, 1999)
- Delete and Roll with Terry Bozzio, Gerald Preinfalk (Next Generation Enterprises, 2002)
- [Sic] (Abstract Logix, 2006)
- Improvision with Jeff Sipe, Matt Garrison (Abstract Logix, 2007)
- The Official Triangle Sessions with Jeff Sipe, Neal Fountain (Abstract Logix, 2009)
- 24 Tales with Marco Minnemann (Abstract Logix, 2010)
- FAT with Raphael Preuschl, Herbert Pirker (Abstract Logix, 2012)
- Now with Gary Husband (Abstract Logix, 2013)
- FAT: Living The Dream with Raphael Preuschl, Herbert Pirker (Abstract Logix, 2015)
- #awesome with Raphael Preuschl, Herbert Pirker (Abstract Logix, 2018)
