= Jeff Sipe Trio =

Studio album by Jeff Sipe Trio
- Released: 2014
- Recorded: August–September, 2013
- Studio: Washington and Lee University, Lexington, Virginia
- Genre: Jazz
- Length: 41:40
- Label: Abstract Logix; ABLX 045
- Producer: Graham Spice

Jeff Sipe Trio is the debut album by the group of the same name, led by drummer Jeff Sipe. It was recorded in August and September, 2013, at Washington and Lee University in Lexington, Virginia, and was released in 2014 by Abstract Logix. On the album, Sipe is joined by guitarist Mike Seal and bassist Taylor Lee.

Concerning the contents of the album, Sipe commented: "The song choices that were made for this record all stressed the importance of having strong melodies... in both the compositions and the way we improvised. This material is strong enough to stand on its own – these are songs, first and foremost."

== Reception ==
Professional ratings
Review scores
Source	Rating
All About Jazz	4/5 stars

In a review for All About Jazz, Mark Sullivan wrote: "While always technically impressive, these tracks all sound like songs... A strong debut recording from a group that sounds as if they have been playing together much longer than they have. Their eclectic, contemporary fusion approach fits right in with the rest of the Abstract Logix roster."

Dean Budnick, writing for Relix, stated: "By turns tender and invigorating, the album highlights the group's range, guided by a bandleader who describes himself with a laugh as 'a jazz drummer in the land of the banjo.'"

== Track listing ==
1. "Trumpet" (Mike Seal) – 3:00
2. "Alberta" (Taylor Lee / Jeff Sipe) – 4:17
3. "Banana Pudding" (Jaron Bradley / Taylor Lee) – 5:27
4. "April" (Mike Seal) – 3:17
5. "Lighting Man" (Taylor Lee) – 6:03
6. "Renee" (Mike Seal) – 3:35
7. "Naima" (John Coltrane) – 5:10
8. "Home Town" (Mike Seal) – 4:26
9. "I'm So Lonesome I Could Cry" (Hank Williams) – 3:40
10. "Happy Evil Happy" (Jeff Sipe) – 2:45

== Personnel ==
- Jeff Sipe – drums
- Mike Seal – electric guitar
- Taylor Lee – bass guitar
