= Project Z (band) =

American indie rock/jazz fusion/jam band

Project Z was an American indie rock, jazz fusion, and jam band, active in the early 2000s.

Project Z was founded by leader Jimmy Herring (guitar), Rickey Keller (bass), and Jeff Sipe (drums), as an offshoot of Sipe's Atlanta band Apartment Project, which often included Keller and which Herring sat in with on occasion.

The "Z" in the band name stands for "Zambi", Bruce Hampton's name for his personal and musical philosophy. Herring had played in Hampton's Aquarium Rescue Unit, and Keller had also played with Hampton.

According to Herring, the band's goal in live performances was to "totally improvise for real", sometimes detuning their instruments to prevent the band members from falling back on their existing musical vocabulary. According to Dean Budnick, "The result may not be everyone's cup of Z, but in the live setting, it is often a stunning, sublime experience".

== Discography ==
- Project Z (2000, Terminus 0008-2)
- Lincoln Memorial (2005, Abstract Logix)
