= Jeff Sipe =

American drummer

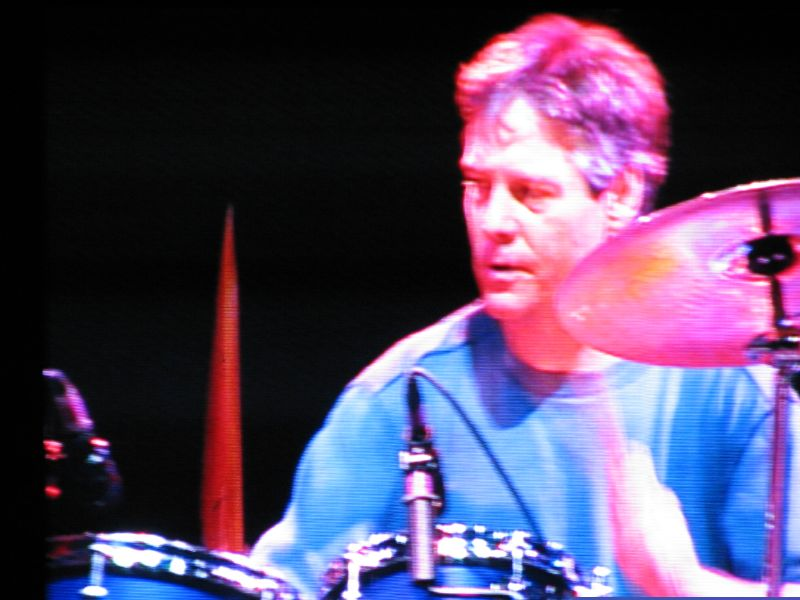
- Jeff Sipe with Phil and Friends in 2007

Background information
- Birth name: Jeffrey Lee Sipe
- Also known as: Apt. Q258
- Born: January 31, 1959 (age 66); Berlin, Germany
- Genres: Rock, experimental rock, avant-garde jazz
- Occupation: Musician
- Instrument: Drums
- Years active: 1972–present
- Labels: Tone Center, Compass, Abstract Logix
- Website: jeffsipemusic.com

Jeff Sipe (born January 31, 1959), also known as Apt. Q258, is an American drummer. He works mainly in rock and jazz fusion. He is a founding member of Aquarium Rescue Unit with Bruce Hampton. He was a member of Leftover Salmon and the Zambiland Orchestra, an experimental big band with members of Phish and Widespread Panic. He has toured with Trey Anastasio, Jeff Coffin, Jimmy Herring, Warren Haynes, Keller Williams, John McLaughlin, and guitarist Shawn Lane.

== Discography ==
=== As leader or co-leader ===
- Art of the Jam (Dynasonic, 2005)
- Cosmic Farm (Tone Center, 2005)
- Timeless (Blues Planet, 2006)
- Duet with Jeff Coffin (Compass, 2011)
- Jeff Sipe Trio (Abstract Logix, 2014)

With Aquarium Rescue Unit

- 1992 Col. Bruce Hampton & the Aquarium Rescue Unit
- 1993 Mirrors of Embarrassment
- 1994 eeePee
- 1994 In a Perfect World
- 2007 Warren Haynes Presents: The Benefit Concert, Vol. 2

As member

- 1999 Laughing Water, Jazz Is Dead
- 1999 The Nashville Sessions, Leftover Salmon
- 2001 Project Z, Project Z
- 2006 Lincoln Memorial, Project Z

=== As guest ===
With Jeff Coffin

- 2011 Jeff Coffin & the Mutet – Live!
- 2011 Duet
- 2006 Bloom

With Jonas Hellborg

- 1996 Temporal Analogues of Paradise
- 1997 Time Is the Enemy
- 1999 Zenhouse
- 2002 Personae

With Susan Tedeschi

- 2002 Wait for Me
- 2004 Live from Austin TX
- 2008 Back to the River

With Keller Williams

- 2007 12
- 2007 Dream
- 2008 Live

With others

- 1987 Arkansas, Bruce Hampton
- 1994 Cedell Davis, CeDell Davis
- 1999 Beauty and the Bloodsucker, Eugene Chadbourne
- 2003 The Grease Factor, Shane Theriot
- 2003 Warren Haynes Presents: The Benefit Concert Vol. 2, Gov't Mule
- 2004 Joseph Patrick Moore's Drum & Bass Society Vol.1, Joseph Patrick Moore
- 2007 Improvision, Alex Machacek
- 2008 Lifeboat, Jimmy Herring
- 2008 Long Road, Drew Emmitt
- 2008 Original Boardwalk Style: Live in Atlantic City, Trey Anastasio
- 2009 Official Triangle Sessions, Alex Machacek
- 2012 Subject to Change Without Notice, Jimmy Herring
- 2013 Beyond the Ragasphere, Debashish Bhattacharya
- 2013 Tell the Ones I Love, Steep Canyon Rangers
- 2017 Live in San Francisco, John McLaughlin & the 4th Dimension/ Jimmy Herring & the Invisible Whip
- 2022 Circus No. 9, Circus No. 9
