= Jimmy Herring =

American guitarist (born 1962)

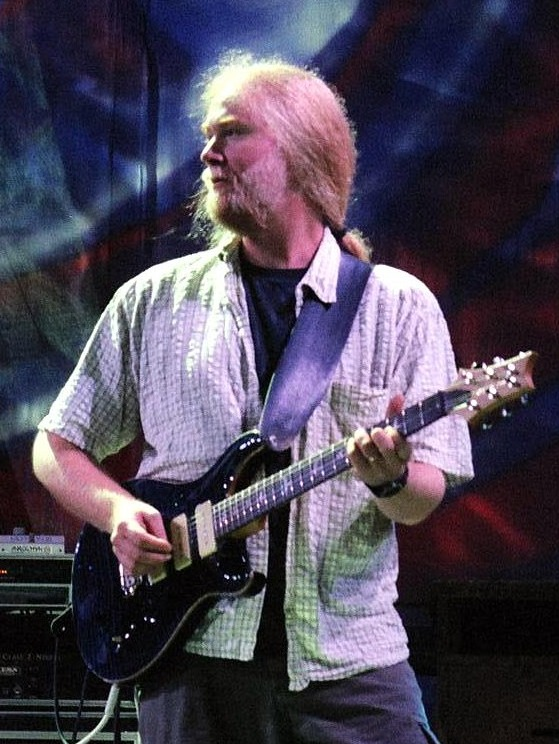
- Herring performing with The Dead at the Virginia Beach Amphitheater on June 17, 2003

Background information
- Born: January 22, 1962 (age 64); Fayetteville, North Carolina, U.S.
- Genres: Rock, jazz fusion, instrumental rock
- Occupation: Musician
- Instrument: Guitar
- Years active: 1987–present
- Labels: Abstract Logix, Interscope, Widespread, Columbia, House of Blues
- Member of: Widespread Panic
- Formerly of: Aquarium Rescue Unit, Jazz Is Dead, The Allman Brothers Band, Phil Lesh and Friends, The Other Ones, The Dead, Trigger Hippy, Project Z

Jimmy Herring (born January 22, 1962) is an American guitarist, known as the lead guitarist for the band Widespread Panic since 2006. He is a founding member of Aquarium Rescue Unit and Jazz Is Dead and has played with The Allman Brothers Band, Project Z, Derek Trucks Band, Phil Lesh and Friends, and The Dead.

== Career ==
A native of Fayetteville, North Carolina, Herring is the son of a high school English teacher and a Superior Court judge. The youngest of three brothers, he attended Terry Sanford High School in Fayetteville. Although he played saxophone in the high school band, he became known for his talent on guitar, which he had begun playing at age 13. Herring had a Telecaster guitar with a Stratocaster neck, in the same style as one of his biggest influences, Steve Morse of the Dixie Dregs. After high school he formed the Paradox, a cover band that played mostly jazz fusion and songs by the Dixie Dregs, Al Di Meola, and Chuck Mangione. The band's horn section included Wayne Rigsby and Charles Humphries on trumpet and Herring on saxophone. After graduating from high school, in 1980, Herring attended a summer session at the Berklee College of Music. In addition, he is a graduate of The Guitar Institute of Technology in Hollywood, California.

Herring was the lead guitarist for the jam band Col. Bruce Hampton and the Aquarium Rescue Unit. Formed in Atlanta in 1989, its members include Allman Brothers Band bassist Oteil Burbridge and Leftover Salmon drummer Jeff Sipe. He was invited to participate on the H.O.R.D.E. tour with Aquarium Rescue Unit in 1992 and 1993 and was offered the lead guitar job in the Allman Brothers Band after Dickey Betts was arrested after a show in Saratoga Springs, New York on July 30, 1993. Herring declined to take the position full-time. Bruce Hampton left Aquarium Rescue Unit in 1994, citing time pressure as his reason. Herring and other members continued to tour in early 1997 until drummer Jeff Sipe departed for Leftover Salmon.

In 1998 and 1999 Herring went on tour as Jazz Is Dead with bassist Alphonso Johnson, keyboardist T Lavitz, and drummer Billy Cobham. The band's albums included jazz rock versions of songs by the Grateful Dead. Herring also appeared on the album Out of the Madness by The Derek Trucks Band. He went on tour with the Allman Brothers Band in 2000, then joined Phil Lesh of the Grateful Dead in Phil Lesh and Friends.

In 2002, Herring joined The Other Ones, a band which included four former members of the Grateful Dead — Phil Lesh, Bob Weir, Mickey Hart, and Bill Kreutzmann. Herring continued to play with the group, now renamed The Dead, in 2003 and 2004.

In 2005, he also toured with the jazz, funk, and occasionally bluegrass-oriented band The Codetalkers, which featured Herring on guitar with his previous bandmate Col. Bruce Hampton on vocals, harmonica, and guitar. This band also allowed Herring to expand a musical friendship with Codetalkers' front man Bobby Lee Rodgers, with whom Herring formed a new band in the spring of 2006 (tentatively dubbed Herring, Rodgers, and Sipe). 2005 also marked the release of the Lincoln Memorial disc from Project Z, of which Jimmy is a founding member. In January 2005, Herring appeared on the Jam Cruise 3 stage with several acts, including Colonel Les Claypool's Fearless Flying Frog Brigade.

Herring left Phil Lesh and Friends in November, 2005. On August 3, 2006, Widespread Panic announced Herring would be taking over the lead guitar spot in the band after the departure of George McConnell. Also in 2006, Herring and an almost complete original lineup of Aquarium Rescue Unit reunited as Col. Bruce Hampton and The Aquarium Rescue Unit featuring Oteil Burbridge, Jimmy Herring, Col. Bruce Hampton and Jeff Sipe with Bobby Lee Rodgers sitting in.

In 2006, Jimmy officially became a member of Widespread Panic as their new lead guitar player. His first performance with the group was at Radio City Music Hall.

In 2008, Herring released Lifeboat, his first official solo album, on Abstract Logix. The material consists primarily of instrumental jazz-rock fusion, and features a rotating lineup of long-time Herring collaborators, including Oteil and brother Kofi Burbridge, Jeff Sipe, alto and soprano saxophonist Greg Osby, and others, including two songs featuring Derek Trucks. The album was met with generally positive reviews.

On February 7, 2009, Herring, along with Steve Gorman (The Black Crowes), guitarist Audley Freed (Jakob Dylan, ex-Crowes, Blue Floyd) and bassist-singer Nick Govrik, made their live debut of Trigger Hippy at the Cox Capitol Theater in Macon, Georgia.

On August 21, 2012, Jimmy Herring released Subject to Change Without Notice, his second solo album on Abstract Logix. The album received rave reviews and was produced by John Keane who is well known for producing albums for Widespread Panic, R.E.M, The Indigo Girls among others. Jimmy Herring was also on the cover of Guitar Player Magazine the very same year. He toured the album extensively in the United States during the Fall of 2012 with Jeff Sipe, Neal Fountain and Matt Slocum.

In 2013, Jimmy Herring, Wayne Krantz, Michael Landau, Etienne Mbappe and Keith Carlock started a band called The Ringers. The idea came from Abstract Logix Founder and Producer Souvik Dutta. The group performed five concerts in the United States.

The Ringers returned in 2014 performing fourteen concerts in January and February, this time with drummer Gary Novak.

In 2017, Jimmy Herring formed The Invisible Whip with Jeff Sipe on drums, Jason Crosby on violin and Rhodes, Kevin Scott on bass, Matt Slocum on Organ. They performed 50 shows, which includes co-billing with John McLaughlin on his farewell American Tour.

In 2018, Abstract Logix released Live in San Francisco, a live album from John McLaughlin and Jimmy Herring's co-bill tour from the year prior.

On May 26, 2018, Jimmy Herring played guitar with The Dave Matthews Band in Atlanta, Georgia. He joined the band on stage for the songs Satellite and #41 where he again displayed his smooth playing style and warmth on the guitar.

In 2019, Jimmy Herring formed The 5 of 7, featuring Kevin Scott on bass, Matt Slocum on keys, Darren Stanley on drums and Rick Lollar on voice and guitar.

On July 21, 2024, Widespread Panic announced on social media that Herring had been diagnosed with stage 1 tonsil cancer.

== Equipment ==
One of Herring's primary guitars is a white PRS NF3 model guitar with a maple neck, stock electronics, mint green pickguard and Dunlop 6000 frets. As of 2019, for the Jimmy Herring and the 5 of 7 projects, Herring has primarily used a natural finished PRS NF3 model guitar that was custom made for him by Paul Reed Smith. He has also been known to use a modified American Standard Fender Stratocaster. The Stratocaster is equipped with two Lollar Imperial humbuckers. The fingerboard radius has been flattened out to 20" and has Dunlop 6000 fret wire, which are the tallest and widest guitar frets manufactured today.

Herring also uses a 1969 Stratocaster as well as several other PRS guitars (including a hollowbody) and has played a 1970 Gibson SG given as a gift from Derek Trucks. Although he has long used effects sparingly, his 2005 Codetalkers rig saw him sport an Ernie Ball volume pedal and an H&K Tube Factor. He has expanded his effects pedals when playing Dead related music, and sported a TC Electronic M-One, and a Mutron with both The Dead and Phil Lesh and Friends. He splits the signal off at the speaker output of his amp and uses that signal to drive a separate solid state amp just for reverb. The reverb level is controlled with a volume pedal. As of early 2014, the reverb unit is an Eventide Space Reverb. Amps are chosen for specific venues and projects. Most common now are a slightly modified blackface Super Reverb head, slightly modified blackface Pro Reverb, slightly modified blackface Twin Reverb, stock blond/black Bassman head. Depending on the amp, the speakers are either Tone Tubby or ElectroVoice. In the last few years, Jimmy has also employed amps from Homestead and Germino, and guitars from PRS, an NF3, a Custom 22 with an extra volume knob for the neck pickup, a 20th PS Anniversary, and a 594. The NF3 and Custom 22 are the most prevalent. A Stratocaster with 3 single coils is sometimes used as well.

=== With Widespread Panic ===
At the beginning of Herring's tenure with Widespread Panic he was using his favorite guitar, a 3-color sunburst Stratocaster built by his friend Gene Baker at the Fender Custom Shop, equipped with two Seymour Duncan ‘59 reissue humbuckers, with a 1973 Marshall Superlead 100 watt amp accompanied by a 4x12 Marshall stereo and a ‘67 blackface Fender Super Reverb as amplifiers. During the remainder of the Fall 2006 tour Herring continued to use his custom shop Strat. At the beginning of Fall 2007, Herring began using Fuchs Overdrive Supreme amplifiers. Into 2009 Herring continued to use Fuchs amps, but now used a Tripledrive Supreme 100 watt head, and occasionally an Overdrive Supreme 100 watt head. He uses a Tone Tubby 4x12 cab and two 2x12 Hard Truckers speaker cabs with Alnico tone tubby speakers. He also uses a Fractal Audio Axe-Fx for effects, mainly reverb and delay sounds. In 2011 he continues to use Fuchs as his main amplifier. His main guitars are the White American Standard Stratocaster with Lollar Imperial humbuckers and an MIJ '62 Telecaster Custom reissue with Lollar Vintage T pickups.

== Discography ==
As a leader

- Lifeboat (Abstract Logix, 2008)
- Subject to Change Without Notice (Abstract Logix, 2012)
- Live in San Francisco (Abstract Logix, 2018)

With Aquarium Rescue Unit

- Eepeee (1994)
- In a Perfect World (1994)
- The Calling (2003)

With Col. Bruce Hampton

- Arkansas (1987/2000)

With Col. Bruce Hampton & the Aquarium Rescue Unit

- Col. Bruce Hampton & the Aquarium Rescue Unit (1992)
- Mirrors of Embarrassment (1993)

With Endangered Species (Herring, T. Lavitz, Richie Hayward, and Kenny Gradney)

- Endangered Species (Tone Center, 2001)

With Frogwings

- Croakin' at Toad's (Flying Frog Records, 2000)

With Jazz Is Dead

- Blue Light Rain (1998)
- Laughing Water (1999)
- Great Sky River (2001)

With Phil Lesh and Friends

- There and Back Again (2002)

With Joseph Patrick Moore

- Decade 1996-2005 (2006)
- Soul Cloud (2000)

With Project Z

- Project Z (2001)
- Lincoln Memorial (2005)

With Derek Trucks Band

- Out of the Madness (1998)

With Widespread Panic

- Free Somehow (2008)
- Dirty Side Down (2010)
- Street Dogs (2015)
- Snake Oil King (2024)
