= Talya Fishman =

American academic (born 1955)

- Born: April 30, 1955 (age 71); Hackensack, New Jersey, U.S.
- Occupation: Jewish studies scholar
- Spouse: Max Apple
- Relatives: Sam Apple (stepson)
- Awards: Guggenheim Fellowship (2004)

Academic background
- Education: Wesleyan University (BA); Jewish Theological Seminary of America (MA); Harvard University (PhD)
- Thesis: Kol Sachal's Critique of Rabbinic Tradition: A Solution to the Problem of Galut (1986)

Academic work
- Discipline: Jewish studies
- Sub-discipline: Judaism in pre-18th-century Christian and Muslim societies
- Institutions: Boston University; Rice University; University of Pennsylvania

Talya Fishman (born April 30, 1955) is an American scholar of Jewish studies. A 2004 Guggenheim Fellow, she specializes in Judaism in Christian and Muslim societies up until the 18th century, and she is author of Shaking the Pillars of Exile (1997) and Becoming the People of the Talmud (2011). She is Associate Professor of Near Eastern Languages & Civilizations at the University of Pennsylvania.

== Biography ==
Talya Fishman was born on April 30, 1955, in Hackensack, New Jersey. Her father Hertzel Fishman was a rabbi and writer who served in the Jewish Agency for Israel and the Israeli government. She obtained her BA from Wesleyan University in 1976, her MA from the Jewish Theological Seminary of America in 1979, and her PhD from Harvard University in 1986. Her doctoral dissertation was titled Kol Sachal's Critique of Rabbinic Tradition: A Solution to the Problem of Galut.

Fishman became an instructor in religion at Boston University in 1984 and was promoted to assistant professor in 1986, before leaving in 1988 to become a visiting assistant professor at Columbia University during the spring 1989 semester. In 1989, she joined Rice University as an assistant professor of history and was promoted to associate professor in 1998. in 2001, she joined the University of Pennsylvania as an associate professor of religious studies.

Fishman was a postdoctoral fellow at the Center for Jewish Studies (1986-1987) and the Rothschild Foundation (1991-1992), as well as a visiting associate professor at Stanford (1996-1997, 2000) and the University of California, Berkeley (1999). She was a 1995-1996 National Endowment for the Humanities Fellow, a 1995-1996 Stanford Humanities Center Fellow, a 2000-2001 American Council of Learned Societies Fellow, and a 2003-2004 Katz Center for Advanced Judaic Studies Fellow.

Fishman specializes in Judaism in Christian and Muslim societies up until the 18th century. In 1997, she released her book Shaking the Pillars of Exile, a book analyzing the Venetian religious critique Kol Sakhal. In 2004, she was awarded a Guggenheim Fellowship for "a study of the inscription of Oral Torah and the formation of Jewish culture in the Middle Ages". She won the Jewish Book Council's 2011 Nahum M. Sarna Memorial Award for her book Becoming the People of the Talmud, which is about "the circumstances that have shaped the cultural meaning of Jewish traditions". She has also taught courses on Jewish literature, law, mysticism, and politics. She has written for the Jewish Review of Books.

Fishman has two children with his husband, writer Max Apple, as well as two stepchildren from Apple's previous marriage (including Sam Apple). One of her daughters suffered from cerebral palsy.

== Works ==
- Shaking the Pillars of Exile: 'Voice of a Fool,' an Early Modern Jewish Critique of Rabbinic Culture (1997) (Note: Reviews of this book:)
- Becoming the People of the Talmud: Oral Torah as Written Tradition in Medieval Jewish Cultures (2011) (Note: Reviews of this book:)
