= Heeb =

American Jewish paper and online magazine

- Categories: Satirical magazine/website; Jewish themes
- Frequency: Quarterly (print, 2002–2010); digital (2010–2019)
- First issue: 2002
- Final issue: 2010 (magazine); website dormant by 2019; relaunched as Heeb Media 2025
- Company: Heeb Media, LLC
- Country: USA
- Language: English
- Website: heebmedia.com (current) heebmagazine.com (archive)

Heeb is an American Jewish media brand that published a quarterly magazine from 2001 to 2010 and operated a website until 2019, when it went dormant. In 2025 it was relaunched as Heeb Media, a nonprofit media organization. The name of the publication is a reference to the ethnic slur "heeb", an abbreviation of Hebrew. However, in this case, the word "heeb" seeks to function as empowerment for the Jewish community, thus eliminating the hatred associated with the word.

== Origin ==
The magazine was founded by Jennifer Bleyer, a graduate of Columbia University, and initially funded through the Joshua Venture fellowship program, with additional backing from Steven Spielberg and Charles Bronfman. Bleyer, who went on to work as a freelance journalist and later retrained as a social worker, ended her association with the magazine in 2003. Taking over for her as editor and publisher was Harvard Divinity School graduate Joshua Neuman. Neuman's goal was to spread the idea of Heeb as a "lifestyle magazine", incorporating events like a traveling Heeb Storytelling show in order to reach an underserved Jewish progressive market around the country. The magazine's subtitle was "The New Jew Review".

== Highlights ==
It has become known for its satire and sardonic approach to reaching Jewish readers of all streams. In a late 2006 edition, a live pig was photographed running across a traditional Sabbath dinner table. Heeb’s satirist, David Deutsch, who used his own table to stage the photos, asked his rabbi if it were kosher to use a live pig on his table for this purpose, as pig meat is considered unkosher. His rabbi said it wasn't a problem, but recommended that he wash the table afterwards.

The magazine has been described as anti-establishment and left-wing in its editorial outlook, though former editors have described its approach as politically heterodox, publishing voices from a broad Jewish political spectrum. It frequently criticizes mainstream American Jewish culture, most famously in an article entitled "Joe Lieberman is a Dickhead". The author of the piece took Lieberman to task for favoring an increase in military spending. Other writers who have contributed to Heeb include Allen Salkin, who wrote "Where Have You Gone Sandy Koufax?", an article about Jews obsessed with Jews in sports.

Heeb has produced events around the world, including the Heeb Storytelling series and an annual Christmas Eve party called Heebonism, which former comics editor Jeff Newelt described as "the cooler, hipper version of the MatzoBall, for people who wouldn't be caught dead at the MatzoBall". The Storytelling series has been attended by Natalie Portman, Rose McGowan, Kate Beckinsale and Colin Farrell.

In March 2004, in its fifth issue, Heeb featured the photo spread entitled Crimes of Passion that spoofed Mel Gibson's The Passion of the Christ. The spread included a half naked Virgin Mary (with pierced nipples) and a Jesus with his genitals wrapped in a tallit.

The Catholic League cited the photo spread in its 2004 Report on Anti-Catholicism, objecting to its depiction of Jesus and the Virgin Mary.

Abraham Foxman, director of the Anti-Defamation League (ADL) published a letter to Heeb decrying the spread as "blasphemous to both Christians and Jews".

On the April 27, 2004, episode of The Daily Show, Jon Stewart remarked: "the best solution to international terrorism? The giveaway. For any international terrorist who turns himself in—a free lifetime subscription to Heeb." The quip reflected the magazine's growing cultural profile among young American Jews.

At its peak, the magazine had an estimated circulation of around 20,000, though its cultural reach was considered far broader. On June 17, 2004, the Chicago Tribune named Heeb one of America's "50 best magazines", describing it as "intelligent, provocative and oh-so Jewish".

In 2005, Ramones front man, Joey Ramone, posthumously received the Heeb Magazine Lifetime Achievement Award at the first Jewish Music Awards.

In January 2006, Heeb was included as part of the Library of Congress' exhibition "350 Years of Jewish Life in America".

A March 28, 2007, feature in The New York Times Business Section spotlighted how Heeb did creative work for advertisers seeking to reach a young Jewish demographic. The article was accompanied by a photo of three men dressed as Hasidic versions of characters from A Clockwork Orange.

Robert Crumb and wife Aline Kominsky-Crumb illustrated the cover of the magazine's "Love Issue" in the Spring of 2007. As Aline told the magazine in an interview: "I had read Robert's work before I met him and I thought he was Jewish because he's just so whiny."

Rush Hour director Brett Ratner guest edited Heeb's 2008 Summer Edition and included what the magazine claimed to be the first-ever Jewish swimsuit calendar, for the Jewish year 5769, "The Ladies of '69". The calendar was photographed by Elle magazine cover photographer Gilles Bensimon and featured Israeli supermodels Bar Refaeli, Esti Ginzberg and Moran Atias, among others. Ratner also photographed director Roman Polanski at Auschwitz, the site of the Polish-born director's mother's murder during the Holocaust.

In the Fall of 2008, Heeb released its "Politics Issue". The cover, a group of coins being dropped into a hand, was designed by Shepard Fairey's Studio Number One and was a play on Fairey's iconic Obama "Change" image.

In Heeb's Winter 2008 edition, Courtney Love told Heeb of ex-husband Kurt Cobain's legacy: "Every time you buy a Nirvana record, part of that money is not going to Kurt's child, or to me, it's going to a handful of Jew loan officers, Jew private banks, it's going to lawyers who are also bankers..."

In 2009 Heeb released an anthology from its Heeb Storytelling Series titled Sex, Drugs & Gefilte Fish. In 2009 and 2010, Heeb published its countdown list of "The 100 Greatest Jewish Movie Moments", which awarded its top spot to The Big Lebowski.

Heeb ceased publishing the print edition of its magazine in 2010, becoming fully digital amid a dry-up in funding and a rapidly changing media landscape. By 2019, new articles no longer appeared on the website and its social media pages went silent.

In early 2025, digital strategist Mik Moore announced a relaunch of Heeb as a nonprofit media and e-commerce venture called Heeb Media. Moore, a graduate of Vassar College and Georgetown University Law School, had previously served as Chief Strategy Officer at Jewish Funds for Justice, co-founded Schlep Labs, a Jewish political action committee that produced viral pro-Obama videos, founded Moore+Associates, a creative agency working with political campaigns and nonprofit organizations, served on the steering committee of The Jewish Vote, the electoral arm of Jews for Racial and Economic Justice, and contributed writing to +972 Magazine. He had also previously served as editor of New Voices magazine and director of the Jewish Student Press Service. The new Heeb Media aimed to bridge the gap between Gen X and Gen Z audiences through digital video series, podcasts, and collaborations with individual creators, as well as a yearly print issue. Moore said he hoped the new venture would push back against what he called "litmus test culture" and produce "generation-crossing entertainment". Original founder Jennifer Bleyer gave Moore her blessing and joined the advisory board.

The relaunch drew criticism from Arye Dworken, who had served as a staff writer, music editor, and editor-at-large at Heeb through the entire print run and into its web-only years. In a public Facebook post quoted by journalist Luke Ford, Dworken argued that the original magazine had functioned as what he called "accidental ethnography", documenting Jewish identity across divergent political perspectives without demanding ideological alignment. Dworken described the new iteration as a shift from cultural documentation to political advocacy, and said the editorial staff of the original Heeb "represented multiple streams of Jewish life and divergent political perspectives". He also revealed that after the magazine shuttered he had attempted to revive it as a podcast, but that the owner at the time preferred to let the brand lie dormant. Dworken concluded that the current stewards had engaged in "illegitimate succession", converting a cultural institution into a vehicle for "factional advocacy".

== Trademark controversy ==
Heeb Media, LLC has owned the trademark registration for Heeb magazine publications since 29 June 2004. On 1 February 2005, the application was submitted to receive another registration number for the use of Heeb for apparel and entertainment. The original application was denied under Section 2(a) of the Trademark Act, 15 U.S.C.§1052(a). Heeb Media submitted an appeal to the Trademark Trail and Appeal Board (TTAB) at the US Patent and Trademark Office (USPTO) on 26 November 2008, but it was officially denied and abandoned in June 2009. As record of evidence, Heeb Media submitted letters of their own, which stated that the magazine, although criticised by some Jewish and non-Jewish communities that may take offence to the name Heeb, it is widely accepted among the Jewish student population. The Administrative Trademark judge, Karen Kuhlke stated in the official comments that although the applicant submitted sufficient information, it was still not foreseeable to justify the term Heeb as something non-derogative. Kuhlke was also the judge for the Redskins appeal in 2014, in which she cited the Heeb case.

== Roseanne Barr controversy ==
In 2009, Heeb produced its controversial Germany Issue in which Roseanne Barr posed as Adolf Hitler in drag holding a tray of "burned Jew cookies." The photo invoked the ire of Bill O'Reilly on Fox's The O'Reilly Factor. According to Heeb's publisher at the time, Joshua Neuman, it was intended as means to see if joking about Nazis and the Holocaust still evoked the same reactions as in past years. In 2011 Barr stated that it was intended to show that the Holocaust is just an every day thing and it is something that needs to be stopped. Additional controversy about the photos intentions came about in 2018 after the "Roseanne" revival aired and they were questioned during an interview. Barr posted on social media, defending her position, but it was not taken lightly by viewers and through her comments to do so she made offensive remarks which resulted in ABC cancelling the show.

== Contributors ==
Notable contributors and editors have included Arye Dworken, who served as staff writer, music editor, and editor-at-large through the magazine's entire print run, Jeff Newelt, who served as comics editor from 2006 to 2015, Shmarya Rosenberg, Daniel Sieradski, Andy Shernoff, Eli Valley, Myq Kaplan, Moshe Kasher, Noam Gonick, Dara Horn, Julian Tepper, Ann Nocenti, and Marisa Scheinfeld.

=== Notable interviews ===
- Courtney Love
- Drake
- Rick Moranis
- Chelsea Peretti
- Jack Antonoff
- Natasha Lyonne
- Gilbert Gottfried
- Beastie Boys

== See also ==
- Jewish humor
- Jews for Racial and Economic Justice
- +972 Magazine
- New Voices (magazine)
- Jewcy
- Jewlicious
