= The Faster Times =

Online newspaper

The Faster Times was an online newspaper launched by Sam Apple on July 9, 2009. Many print newspapers were going out of business and reporters were losing their jobs. The New York Times reported that in this climate, Apple was able to recruit professional writers guaranteeing them only 75% of revenue from advertisements placed near their stories. In 2010, the paper began a membership program that allows readers to subscribe. Incentives are given to subscribers, but online content continues to be available to the public.

The Faster Times (TFT) is modeled in part after Talking Points Memo, in part after The Huffington Post.

Writers and editors at TFT include award-winning novelists and non-fiction book writers, university professors, a TV comedy writer, and contributors to The New York Times, The New Republic, The Wall Street Journal, The New Yorker, Vanity Fair, the International Herald Tribune, The Christian Science Monitor, GQ, Smithsonian, Bon Appetit, The Atlantic, New York, Slate, Salon.com, and other publications. Along with Apple, TFT's founding editors included Adam Wilson and Adam Baer.

The writers included Onome Akpogheneta, Barrett Brown, Melissa Clark, Ilan Greenburg, Jonathan Mandell, Clancy Martin, Davi Napoleon, Katie Natopolis, Lawrence Osborne, Neal Pollack, Jason Reich, Lincoln Michel, Adam Wilson, Clay Risen, Alain de Botton, Adam Baer, Geoffrey Scharfstein, John Sellers, Charles Siebert, Sarah Silverman, Daria Vaisman, Jonathan Wilson and David Wondrich.

Apple launched TFT with 16 sections that feature the work of correspondents who file daily and columnists who comment weekly or biweekly. Guest posters appear occasionally.

Sam Apple edited New Voices and directed interactive media at Nerve.com before beginning this online newspaper.

Apple sold the paper to Samara Gordon in 2015. Under her leadership, it was a startup in the predictive analytics, social networking, and content marketing space.

The url is now in the possession of a new owner in Serbia.
