= Aaron Rakeffet-Rothkoff =

American rabbi and historian

Rabbi Aaron Rakeffet-Rothkoff אהרון רקפת-רותקוף
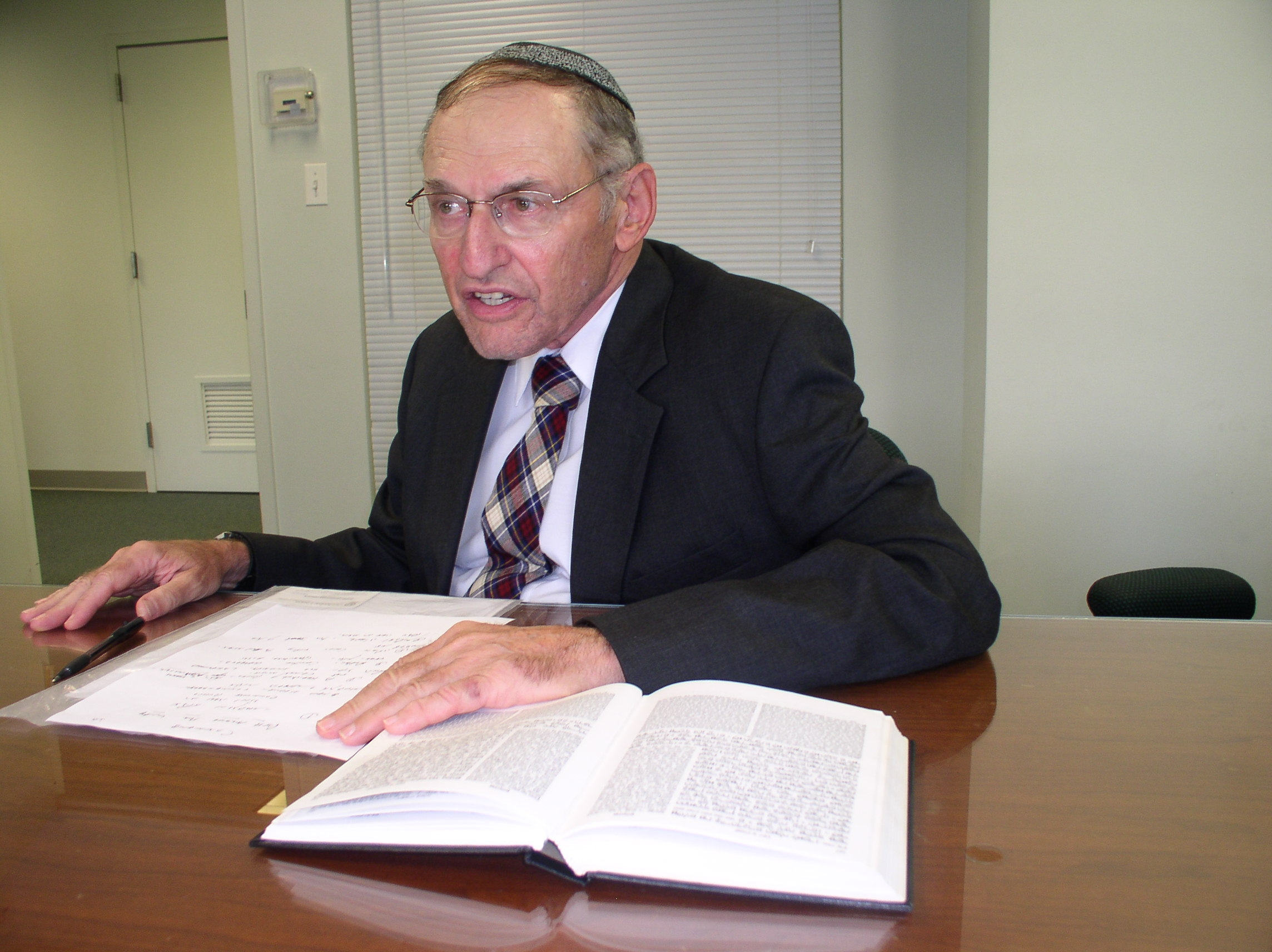
- Rothkoff in 2009

Personal life
- Born: Arnold Rothkoff; December 2, 1937 (age 88) New York City, U.S.
- Spouse: Malkah Grund
- Children: 3
- Education: Yeshiva University

Religious life
- Religion: Judaism
- Denomination: Orthodox Judaism

Jewish leader
- Position: Lecturer
- Yeshiva: Gruss Kollel
- Semikhah: Yaakov Moshe Lessin

Aaron Rakeffet-Rothkoff (Hebrew: אהרון רקפת-רותקוף; born December 2, 1937) is an Israeli-American professor of rabbinic literature at Yeshiva University's Caroline & Joseph Gruss Institute in Jerusalem.

== Biography ==
Rabbi Rakeffet attended Bnei Akiva as a youth. Meir Kahane was one of his madrikhim (מַדְרִיכִים, 'counselors'). Rakeffet met his future wife, Malkah, while giving a shiur at Bnei Akiva.

Rakeffet started his career in 1961 as a pulpit rabbi at Lower Merion Synagogue in Bala Cynwyd, Pennsylvania. In 1962, he moved from Lower Merion to become the spiritual leader of the first Orthodox synagogue in suburban Essex County, New Jersey: Congregation Beth Ephraim of Maplewood and South Orange, New Jersey. During that time, he also served as a high school rebbe at the Marsha Stern Talmudical Academy of Yeshiva University (YU) in Manhattan. In 1969, he moved to Israel and worked as a staff editor on the Encyclopaedia Judaica. He also wrote numerous entries, including those of Rabbi Joseph B. Soloveitchik and Rabbi Eliezer Silver.

Upon the conclusion of the Encyclopaedia Judaica project, Rakeffet pursued teaching, with a particular focus on Torah education for Jewish diaspora students residing in Israel. He was a founding faculty member of Jerusalem Torah College (BMT) in 1969 and served as an educator there for two decades. Additionally, he instructed at Machon Gold and Michlalah-Jerusalem College and he was a founding faculty member at Midreshet Moriah, an advanced program for Torah studies for female scholars.

By 1976, BMT had outgrown its campus and was exploring options to construct a new building. At the time, Joseph Gruss had completed construction on a Jerusalem campus for Rabbi Joseph B. Soloveitchik and Yeshiva University, though he had declined an invitation to teach there. Gruss then considered other options for the campus, such as giving it to the Technion or to the David Yellin College of Education. Rabbi Moshe Horowitz, the director of BMT, asked Rakeffet to speak with Gruss about obtaining the campus for BMT, with Rakeffet impressing upon Gruss that BMT would propagate Rabbi Soloveitchik’s teachings and heritage to future generations in the Jewish homeland. Gruss agreed to give the campus to BMT and to Yeshiva University. BMT moved to the campus, and YU started the Gruss Kollel in the fall of 1976. Rakeffet joined the Gruss Kollel faculty, going on to recruit Nechama Leibowitz to teach, as well.

Rabbi Rakeffet served in the Israel Defense Forces (IDF) until the maximum allowable age. He served in Lebanon during the 1982 Lebanon War. In 1980, he was recruited by Aryeh Kroll to join the Mossad's clandestine Nativ operation to teach Torah in the Soviet Union. Rakeffet visited the Soviet Union in 1981, 1985, and 1989 together with his wife Malkah, and recruited 200 others to also visit. His initial visit motivated him to help found the Shvut Ami organization.

Following the collapse of the Iron Curtain, Rakeffet, with his daughter, joined the International Coalition of Missing Israeli Soldiers. He participated in fundraising, built close ties with Zechariah Baumel and his family, and helped evaluate leads; no conclusive results emerged. He later proposed using agunot marriage standards for cases where evidence suggested soldiers might be deceased, aiming to help families find closure and assist negotiations. The IDF endorsed his proposal, and in 2001, he established a beit din to analyze relevant evidence. After 2.5 years, the beit din concluded the soldiers had died. Rabbi Rakeffet's halakhic innovation of "presumed dead; place of burial unknown" (מקל'ן), is currently used by the IDF to declare a missing soldier "Presumed Dead" in similar cases.

Rabbi Rakeffet felt strongly that a documentary should be made about Rabbi Joseph B. Soloveitchik. After much effort, he found Ethan Isenberg to produce the film, and a donor to subsidize it. The documentary "The Lonely Man of Faith: The Life and Legacy of Rabbi Joseph B. Soloveitchik" was first shown in November 2006.

Rabbi Rakeffet finished his 10-year effort of writing his personal scholarly memoir, "From Washington Avenue to Washington Street", with its publication in 2011. Published by the OU Press in conjunction with Gefen Publishing House. It was his seventh published volume. One critic hailed the memoirs: "Although serious to the core, his wonderful sense of humor shines in this inspiring life story of a true intellectual who continues to devote his talents to the Jewish people and the State of Israel."

In June 2016, Rakafot Aharon Vol 3 was published by Shvut Ami. Rabbi Dr. Yaakov S. Weinstein of East Brunswick, NJ compiled and annotated it based on contemporary Halachic topics presented by Rabbi Rakeffet between 1998 and 2002 in his advanced shiurim given at YU's Gruss Kollel. The topics include: The classic Agunah, Mamzerut, and Artificial Insemination.

In July 2019, Rakafot Aharon Vol. 4 was published by Shvut Ami. The first section on Hilkhot Kiddushin was compiled by Rabbi Dr. Weinstein, based on Rabbi Rakeffet's shiurim. The second section on the Russian Saga consists of material on Rabbi and Mrs. Rakffet's visits to the Soviet Union while working for the Mossad during the 1980s. The third section includes a portion of Rakeffet's published scholarship since 1993. The fourth section contains unique documents and pictures, including the identification of every student in a famous picture of Rabbi Joseph Soloveitchik's 1960 classroom.

In July 2023, Rabbi Rakeffet published "Theodore Herzl and Contemporary Zionism in the Context of Joseph and His Brothers". This essay was originally published in Maaseh Harav by Rabbi Mendi Gopin, which commemorated Rabbi Soloveitchik’s 120th birthday and 30th Yahrtzeit. Rabbi Rakeffet expands upon the theme in Rabbi Soloveitchik’s lecture ‘Joseph and His Brothers’, which recognizes the need for the Mizrachi to work with secular Jews to build the State of Israel. Rabbi Rakeffet quotes sources that encourage religious Jews to appreciate and acknowledge Theodore Herzl’s dedication and accomplishments in creating a Jewish state. Furthermore, he explores the contemporary meaning of ‘Daat Torah’. Per Rabbi Teichtal, “The rabbis must constantly evaluate their outlook on non-Halakhic issues in accordance with reality and the aftereffects of their viewpoints.”

In October 2023, Rabbi Rakeffet published "Rabbinic Authority and Leadership on the Contemporary Scene". This essay explores the origins of Daas Torah, its impact on Israeli society, and how various rabbis dealt with this approach to Rabbinic authority.

== Positions ==
- Spiritual leader of Lower Merion Synagogue in Bala Cynwyd, Pennsylvania (1961–1962)
- Spiritual leader of Congregation Beth Ephraim and Maplewood Jewish Center in New Jersey (1962–1969)
- High School Rebbe at Manhattan Talmudical Academy of Yeshiva University (1962–1969)
- Staff Editor for Encyclopaedia Judaica (1969–1971)
- Jerusalem Torah College (BMT) (1969–1989)
- Machon Gold (1971–1989)
- Michlalah (The Michlalah-Jerusalem College for Women, currently simply Michlalah-Jerusalem College) (1971–1986)
- Midreshet Moriah (1987–2002)
- Gruss Kollel (1976 – Present)

== Works ==
- Bernard Revel: Builder of American Jewish Orthodoxy (1971)
- The Silver Era: Rabbi Eliezer Silver and His Generation (1982)
- Rakafot Aharon (1997) – Collected published writing, (two volumes) Published by Shvut Ami
- Rakafot Aharon Vol 3 (2016) - In Response to Life: The Classic Agunah, Mamzerut, and Artificial Insemination. Published by Shvut Ami.
- Rakafot Aharon Vol 4 (2019) - Hilkhot Kiddushin, The Russian Saga, Published Contemporary Torah History, Documents and Pictures. Published by Shvut Ami.
- The Rav – The World of Rabbi Joseph B. Soloveitchik (1999) – 2 volumes, KTAV Publishing House, Inc. ISBN 0-88125-614-5 (vol 1) and ISBN 0-88125-615-3 (vol 2)
- From Washington Avenue to Washington Street (2011), Gefen Publishing House and OU Press. ISBN 978-965-229-565-1

== Articles ==
- Tradition: A Journal of Orthodox Jewish Thought: Rakeffet-Rothkoff entries
- The Commentator: The Torah and Rabbinics of the Early YC Years
- Jewish Action: Rabbi Meir Kahane: His Life and Thought
- Theodore Herzl and Contemporary Zionism in the Context of Joseph and His Brothers
- Rabbinic Authority and Leadership On the Contemporary Scene

== Lectures ==
- Online archive of articles and talks at YUTorah.org
- Hesped for Joe DiMaggio #1
- Hesped for Joe DiMaggio #2
