= New Voices =

New Voices or New Voice may refer to:

== Awards and programs for emerging talent ==
- New Voices (Celtic Connections musical commission), a series of new musical works commissioned by the Celtic Connections festival, Scotland
- New Voices Award, a picture book award for American writers of colour, established by Lee & Low Books
- New Voices Fellowship, sponsored by the Aspen Institute
- Old Vic New Voices, a British emerging talent programme for theatre
- Brave New Voices, an American youth poetry award
- New Voices, a program at the Bangkok International Film Festival

== Other uses ==
- New Voices (magazine), an American magazine written for and by Jewish college students
- New Voices (TV series), a British television drama series directed by Paul Marcus
- New Voice Entertainment, an American music production company
- New Voices: An Album of First Recordings, a 1965 album by various artists including The Watersons

== See also ==
- NewVoiceMedia, a British cloud service company
