= 1985 New York City Council presidential election =

- November 5, 1985
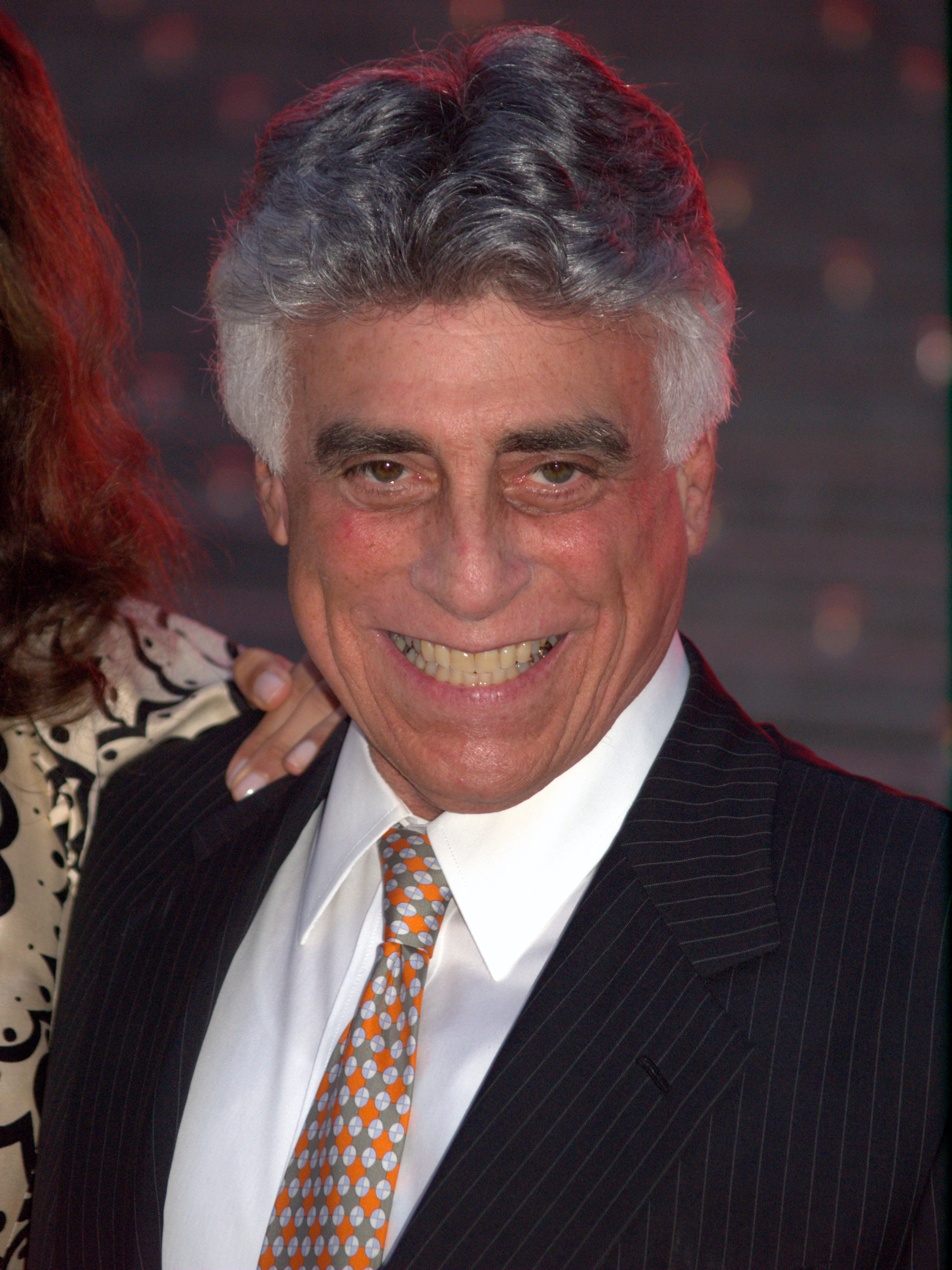

| Nominee | Andrew Stein | Evelyn Guardarramas |
| Party | Democratic | Republican |
| Alliance | Liberal | Conservative |
| Popular vote | 799,431 | 143,277 |
| Percentage | 83.0% | 14.9% |
- Results by State Assembly district Stein: 70–80% 80–90% >90%
President of the City Council before election
Carol Bellamy
Democratic
Elected President of the City Council
Andrew Stein
Democratic

An election was held on November 5, 1985 to elect the President of the New York City Council. Democratic incumbent Carol Bellamy ran for mayor against Ed Koch, leaving the seat vacant for the next term. Andrew J. Stein won the open race, defeating Kenneth Lipper in the Democratic primary. Stein won the general election in a landslide.

== Democratic primary ==
=== Candidates ===
- Angelo DelToro, Assemblyman from East Harlem
- Joseph R. Erazo, former aide to mayor Abraham Beame
- Kenneth Lipper, former deputy mayor and partner of Lehman Brothers and Salomon Brothers investment banks
- Israel Ruiz Jr., State Senator
- Andrew Stein, Manhattan Borough President
- Lorraine Stevens

=== Campaign ===
The campaign evolved into a two-way race between Lipper and Stein. As the only office without an incumbent candidate, it was one of the most expensive and hostile in New York City history. Each of the two main candidates ran multi-million dollar advertising campaigns accusing the other of unethical behavior, with Lipper calling Stein ''a cheap thief''. Another Lipper ad accused Stein of money laundering for having loaned money to his campaigns which he repaid himself with campaign contributions from real estate developers. ''Andy Stein's been going to the laundry, and he's been taking us to the cleaners,'' the commercial said. Another accused him of poor attendance as a member of the State Assembly, depicting him on vacations in Germany and the Caribbean. Stein fired back by calling Lipper "very frustrated and desperate" and his campaign "completely negative."

Lipper, DelToro and Ruiz were initially removed from the ballot following a legal challenge to their nominating petitions, but the Appellate Division court restored them each to the ballot.

Observers described the primary as two races–one for the nomination and a second election between DelToro, Erazo and Ruiz to demonstrate support from the city's Hispanic communities.

=== Results ===
Polls closed at 9:00 p.m.

Results by State Assembly district Stein: 20%–30%; 30%–40%; 40%–50%; 50%–60%; 60%–70%; Lipper: 30%–40%; Ruiz: 30%–40%; DelToro: 40%–50%

1985 Democratic Council President primary (unofficial)
| Party | Candidate | Votes | % |
|---|---|---|---|
| Democratic | Andrew Stein | 286,461 | 49.43% |
| Democratic | Kenneth Lipper | 140,432 | 24.23% |
| Democratic | Israel Ruiz Jr. | 46,846 | 8.08% |
| Democratic | Angelo DelToro | 37,398 | 6.45% |
| Democratic | Joseph R. Erazo | 34,575 | 5.97% |
| Democratic | Lorraine Stevens | 33,232 | 5.73% |
| Total votes | | 579,484 | 100.00% |

Lipper conceded defeat at 10:00 p.m. at the Westbury Hotel. Stein claimed victory shortly afterwards. In his victory speech, he claimed a broad mandate, saying, "We won in every borough with every ethnic group and a broad coalition of people. I think it was also a mandate on my 17 years in public office. I had the record and I don't think anyone else did."

Lipper initially did not make reference to Stein, but in an interview on election night, concluded that "business is a much more ethical and honorable affair than politics. I learned unhappily that my deep concern for the fate of New York was not shared by the public itself in terms of turning out to vote. After all, it's all our subways, all our education system, all our streets that are unsafe."

== General election ==
=== Candidates ===
- Evelyn Guardarramas (Republican)
- Angela M. Powderly (Right to Life)
- Andrew Stein, Manhattan Borough President (Democratic and Liberal)

=== Campaign ===
Stein effectively stopped campaigning after winning the Democratic nomination. Guardarramas attempted to distance herself from her running mate for mayor, Diane McGrath, after McGrath made several controversial proposals, in particular her promise to replace Police Commissioner Benjamin Ward and Schools Chancellor Nathan Quinones. Guardarramas instead endorsed incumbent mayor Ed Koch. In response, the Republican and Conservative parties urged voters to boycott her campaign and leave the Council President race blank. Guy Velella, running for Comptroller as the third candidate on the Republican-Conservative ticket, publicly attacked Guardarramas for "ranting over nonexistent biases.''

=== Results ===
1985 New York City Council President election (unofficial)
| Party | Candidate | Votes | % |
|---|---|---|---|
| Democratic | Andrew Stein | 799,441 | 83.03% |
| Republican | Evelyn Guardarramas | 143,277 | 14.88% |
| Right to Life | Angela M. Powderly | 20,093 | 2.09% |
| Total votes | | 962,811 | 100.00% |
