= Rubikon =

Band from Boston, Massachusetts, US

Rubikon is a band from Boston, Massachusetts.

== Career ==
The band put out a pair of EPs in 2001 and 2002 before releasing their first full debut album, The Hollow Men, in 2004. After extensive touring, they reformed as a five-piece for 2011's American Dream Machine. The band later partnered with producer Marti Frederiksen (Aerosmith, Brother Cane) for Delta (2015). The single "Live that Lie" was used on Shameless. The album was mixed by Alain Johannes (Queens of the Stone Age, Them Crooked Vultures) and mastered by Howie Weinberg (Metallica, Nirvana).

Their follow-up album, The Record, was released on September 20, 2019, by Round Hill Music. Rubikon premiered their single "Blood on My Hands" on WYYX; Loudwire featured it on their Spotify "Weekly Wire Playlist," and ABC News Radio premiered the official music video. They also premiered their song "Lost September" on Billboard.

Rubikon has toured the country and played with Disturbed, Black Label Society, Damageplan, Sevendust, Shinedown, Nonpoint, The Cult, Tesla, Pop Evil, and Candlebox. Guitarist Josh Gruss is also the chairman, CEO, and founder of Round Hill Music Royalty Partners.

== Singles ==
=== Singles ===
List of singles, with selected chart positions, showing year released and album name
Title	Year	Peak Chart Positions	Album
Title	Year	US Main. Rock	Album
"Blood on My Hands"	2019	37	The Record
"Lose It All"	2023	38	
