= Rachel Kadish =

American author

- Born: August 12, 1969 (age 57); New York City, U.S.
- Education: Solomon Schechter School of Westchester; Princeton University (AB); New York University (MA)
- Occupations: Novelist, short story writer
- Writing career
- Period: 2006–present
- Genres: Fiction, historical fiction
- Notable works: From a Sealed Room (2006); Tolstoy Lied: a Love Story (2007); The Weight of Ink (2017)
- Website: rachelkadish.com

Rachel Kadish (born August 12, 1969) is an American writer of fiction and non-fiction and the author of several novels and a novella. Her novel The Weight of Ink won the National Jewish Book Award in 2017.

== Personal life ==
Born in New York City on August 12, 1969, Kadish grew up in Westchester County, New York, where she attended middle school at Solomon Schechter School of Westchester in Hartsdale, and New Rochelle High School in New Rochelle. Kadish received an A.B. from Princeton University in 1991 and an M.A. from New York University in 1994.

Her novel Tolstoy Lied: a Love Story won the John Gardner Fiction Prize in 2007. Her novel, The Weight of Ink, won the National Jewish Book Award in 2017, the Julia Ward Howe Prize in 2018, and the Association of Jewish Libraries Fiction Award in 2018.

She is the recipient of fellowships from the National Endowment of the Arts and the Massachusetts Cultural Council.

She is involved in New Voices, a project using the arts to work for tolerance.

== Writing career ==
Rachel Kadish's 2017 novel, The Weight of Ink, winner of the National Jewish Book Award, is a work of historical fiction set in London in the 1660s and in the early twenty-first century. It tells the interwoven stories of two women: Ester Velasquez, an immigrant from Amsterdam who is permitted to scribe for a blind rabbi just before the plague hits London; and Helen Watt, an ailing historian with a love of Jewish history.

Her short stories and essays have been read on US National Public Radio and have appeared in publications including The New York Times, The Paris Review, Salon, and The Pushcart Prize Anthology.

Kadish has also written in Quartz magazine about Chiune Sugihara, the Japanese diplomat who saved her family during World War II and in The Paris Review on the importance of historical fiction in illuminating forgotten history.

She is a graduate of Princeton University and New York University.

== Bibliography ==
=== Novels ===
- From a Sealed Room (2006). Boston: Houghton Mifflin ISBN 978-0618562411
- Tolstoy Lied: a Love Story (2007). Boston: Mariner Books ISBN 978-0618919833
- The Weight of Ink (2017). Boston: Houghton Mifflin Harcourt ISBN 978-0544866461

=== Novellas ===
- I Was Here (2014 ebook)
