= Joshua Neuman =

American editor, publisher, writer, and filmmaker

- Born: March 7, 1972 (age 54); Paramus, New Jersey, U.S.
- Education: Brown University (BA); Harvard Divinity School (MA)
- Occupations: Editor; publisher; writer; filmmaker
- Known for: Editor-in-chief and publisher of Heeb magazine

Joshua Neuman (born March 7, 1972) is an American editor, publisher, writer, and filmmaker. He is best known as the editor-in-chief and publisher of Heeb magazine, a satirical Jewish cultural publication, from 2003 to 2011.

== Early life and education ==
Neuman grew up in Paramus, New Jersey. His paternal grandparents fled Vienna, Austria, for the United States during World War II, leaving behind family members who died in concentration camps. He graduated from Brown University and subsequently attended Harvard Divinity School, where he received a master's degree in the study of religion. He later taught undergraduate courses in the Philosophy of Religion at New York University from 1998 to 2003, and worked as a Museum Educator at the Museum of Jewish Heritage in New York from 1998 to 2000.

== Career ==
=== Heeb Magazine ===
Neuman joined Heeb magazine as music editor at its launch in January 2002, and became editor-in-chief and publisher in August 2003, taking over from founder Jennifer Bleyer. He served in the role for over eight years, until March 2011 when the magazine suspended its print edition. Describing his vision to The New York Times, Neuman said he was "trying to emulate Vice in that this is more than a magazine, but a lifestyle," adding, "As Vice is to cocaine, we are to chocolate layer cake." Under his stewardship the magazine attracted celebrity contributors including Sarah Silverman, Brett Ratner, David Cross, Carrie Brownstein, Bar Refaeli, The Beastie Boys, Bob Saget, R. Crumb, and Jason Segal, and was recognized by the Chicago Tribune as one of America's 50 best magazines in 2004.

Neuman led a years-long effort to trademark the word "Heeb" for events and apparel, which was denied by the United States Patent and Trademark Office on the grounds that the term was potentially offensive. The administrative trademark judge Karen Kuhlke, who ruled against the application, later cited the Heeb case in her 2014 ruling on the Washington Redskins trademark dispute.

Following the suspension of the print edition, Neuman joined the advisory board of the relaunched Heeb Media nonprofit in 2025.

=== Books ===
In 2005, Neuman co-authored The Big Book of Jewish Conspiracies with Heeb humor editor David Deutsch, published by St. Martin's Griffin. The book is a satirical treatment of antisemitic conspiracy theories, built on the premise that the Jews really were behind everything from capitalism to the September 11 attacks, and was inspired partly by the wave of conspiracy theories blaming Jews for 9/11 that circulated in the Middle East following the attacks. Neuman has said the project was also informed by his family history: his paternal grandparents had fled Vienna during World War II, leaving behind relatives who perished in the Holocaust. The authors said they aimed for the book to read like genuine conspiratorial writing, deliberately blurring fact and fabrication, a choice that led some readers and antisemitic commentators online to cite the book, prior to its release, as if it were a genuine work of antisemitic propaganda. Critics described the book's premise as ambitious but noted that some of its references were sufficiently obscure that, in Neuman's own words, "only five people in the world will be able to participate in some jokes."

In 2009, Heeb arts editor Shana Liebman edited the anthology Sex, Drugs & Gefilte Fish: The Heeb Storytelling Collection, published by Grand Central Publishing, drawn from the Heeb Storytelling series that Neuman had helped establish. Contributors included Laura Silverman, Michael Showalter, Andy Borowitz, Joel Stein, Ben Greenman, Darrin Strauss, and Stephen Glass. The Jewish Book Council gave the collection a mixed review, noting that the stories worked better as spoken-word performances than as written pieces.

=== Flaunt Magazine ===
From April 2011 to June 2012, Neuman served as editor of Flaunt, an international fashion and culture magazine based in Los Angeles. During his tenure he commissioned cover stories featuring interviews with Ewan McGregor and Chris Hemsworth, and oversaw what the magazine described as the first print periodical to be wrapped entirely in denim, produced in celebration of Guess's 30th anniversary.

=== GOOD Worldwide ===
Neuman joined GOOD Worldwide in July 2012, initially as Editorial Director and later as Head of Content, a role he held until September 2015. He directed all editorial content across the company's website, quarterly print magazine, videos, and social media channels, and oversaw the GOOD Cities Project, a Ford-sponsored initiative. GOOD's website was honored at the 2015 Webby Awards.

=== Later career ===
From October 2015 to July 2023, Neuman operated Heretofore Agency, a creative consultancy based in Los Angeles. Since July 2023 he has served as Senior Vice President of Development at Seeing Red, a Canadian production company.

His documentary Johnny Physical Lives, about his late brother Jonathan, played at dozens of film festivals worldwide and was selected as a Vimeo Staff Pick Premiere. He is currently working on a book about Carroll Rosenbloom and Georgia Frontiere, former owners of the Los Angeles Rams. His writing has appeared in Esquire, Vice, Los Angeles magazine, Victory Journal, and Slate.
