= Howard Jachter =

American rabbi

Rabbi Howard Jachter
- Title: Rabbi

Personal life
- Born: Howard (Chaim) Jachter
- Spouse: Malca Tokayer
- Children: 5
- Parent(s): Ben and Shirley Jachter

Religious life
- Religion: Judaism
- Denomination: Orthodox

Jewish leader
- Synagogue: Sha'arei Orah, the Sephardic Congregation of Teaneck
- Yeshiva: Torah Academy of Bergen County
- Organisation: Beth Din of Elizabeth, New Jersey
- Other: Chair, Agunah Prevention and Resolution Committee, Rabbinical Council of America
- Residence: Teaneck, New Jersey
- Semikhah: Rabbi Isaac Elchanan Theological Seminary

Howard (Chaim) Jachter is an American Orthodox rabbi, Dayan (rabbinical court judge), educator, and author. He sits on the Beth Din of Elizabeth, New Jersey as a Dayan and Get (Jewish divorce) administrator. Noted as an expert on the laws of Jewish divorce, he also chairs the Agunah Prevention and Resolution Committee of the Rabbinical Council of America. Rabbi Jachter is also the consulting rabbi for over 70 Eruvs across the United States. He serves as the Rabbi of Sha'arei Orah, the Sephardic Congregation of Teaneck, and is a faculty member at the Torah Academy of Bergen County (TABC). Author of twenty books and over one thousand online and journal articles, he writes and lectures extensively on contemporary topics in Jewish law and thought. He has five children.

== Early life and education ==
Howard (Chaim) Jachter was born to Ben and Shirley Jachter and grew up in Brooklyn, New York. For elementary and middle school, he attended Yeshiva Rambam, and Marsha Stern Talmudical Academy for high school. Afterward, young Howard went to Yeshivat Har Etzion where he learned directly from Rav Aharon Lichtenstein for 2 years. He earned his bachelor's and master's degrees at Yeshiva University and his rabbinical ordination from Rabbi Isaac Elchanan Theological Seminary. There he learned under and was Shamash to Rav Joseph B. Soloveitchik near the end of his life.

== Career ==
In the early 1990s Jachter served as an associate rabbi in Congregation Beth Judah, Brooklyn, while studying for his rabbinical ordination. In 1993 he joined the rabbinical court of Elizabeth, New Jersey as a Dayan and Get (Jewish divorce) administrator. He is also certified as a Get administrator by the Chief Rabbinate of Israel and given a letter of certification from Rav Ovadia Yosef. By 2008, Jachter estimated he had overseen more than 2,000 Jewish divorces. He chairs the Agunah Prevention and Resolution Committee of the Rabbinical Council of America. In 2015 Jachter testified in a U.S. district court case involving an attack on a Jewish man who had refused to give his wife a get.

He is a strong proponent of civil prenuptial agreements, which avoid the issues created if the husband refuses to give a Get. Jachter requires every couple he marries to sign the RCA prenuptial agreement. He and his wife, Malca, signed the RCA prenuptial agreement before their own wedding.

Jachter is the Rabbi of Sha'arei Orah, the Sephardic Congregation of Teaneck. He is also a community Eruv designer who has advised dozens of American Jewish communities in the construction and maintenance of their Eruvs.

Jachter joined the faculty of the Torah Academy of Bergen County, a Yeshiva high school, in 1995. In tandem with his teaching duties, he serves as faculty advisor for the school's weekly Torah publication, Kol Torah, to which he also contributes articles on Halakha topics. These articles formed the basis for his books Gray Matter, Gray Matter 2, Gray Matter 3, Gray Matter 4, Gray Matter 5, and Reason to Believe: Rational Explanations of Orthodox Jewish Faith. Jachter also established and serves as director of the TABC alumni foundation.

Jachter has also written his first two books on Tanakh between 2018 and 2019, Depths of Yonah, written with his son, Binyamin, and From David to Destruction. These books discuss questions and lessons to be learned from the books of Jonah and Kings, respectively.

In 2020, Jachter wrote a book on the Halakhot of Eruvin, Walking the Line: Hilchot Eruvin from the Sources from the Streets, which made it to #2 for all Jewish Books listed on Amazon.

Another 2 books by Jachter were published in 2021. The first, The Halachic Haircutting Handbook: A Breakthrough Exposure of an Obscure Mitzvah, was once again coauthored with his son, Binyamin. The Jachters, in this book, go through all of the sources, from the Biblical and Talmudic texts to modern technology and patents. The second was the next installment of Jachter's books on Tanakh, Opportunity in Exile: An In-Depth Exploration of Sefer Daniel, focused on understanding the texts and lessons from the Book of Daniel.

In the first month of 2022, Jachter published yet another book, Bridging Traditions: Demystifying Differences Between Sephardic and Ashkenazic Jews, published by the OU Press and printed by Koren Publishers, under their Maggid sub-brand. This has been the longest worked on project Jachter has put out yet. The writing of Bridging Traditions started over 5 years before publication with research starting well before writing. Bridging Traditions uses Jachter's unique position as a Sephardic pulpit Rabbi, who was tested by Rav Ovadiah Yosef, but is himself Ashkenazi and studied from great Ashkenazi leaders, such as Rav Yosef Dov Soloveitchik and Rav Aharon Lichtenstein, to truly make connections between the two Jewish traditions in a clear and understandable fashion.

By May 2022, Jachter continued his rapid-fire pace with his latest Tanakh book, From Chaos to Kingship: An In-Depth Exploration of Megillat Rut, the subtitle of which is an accurate description of the topic at large and Power of Shabbos: Shabbat and Electricity in the 21st Century. Soon after, in honor of his eldest son's marriage, the pair co-authored their third book together, The Aggadic Mindset: How Talmudic Tales Shape the Jewish Outlook in August 2022.

Most recently, in June 2023, Jachter began a series on Chumash, entitled Torat Chaim Dov - Bringing Chumash to Life, beginning with Sefer Devarim.

== Articles and lectures ==
Jachter writes on a wide variety of contemporary topics in Jewish law, among them the use of electricity on Shabbat, infertility, and owning pets. His many columns and lectures on topics in Halakha, Aggadah, and Tanakh are available online at www.koltorah.org, www.yutorah.org, and jewishlink.news.

Jachter's Gray Matter book series discusses contemporary halakhic issues that have arisen during his career with the Beth din and RCA. Gray Matter (2000), for example, discusses the aspects of forcing a man to give a get, while Gray Matter 3 (2008) presents the issue of Mamzerim (halakhically illegitimate children). Reason to Believe discusses both the Modern Orthodox and Haredi viewpoints on conflicts between Torah and scientific knowledge.

== Personal life ==
Jachter married Malca Tokayer in 1995. They have five children and reside in Teaneck, New Jersey.

== Bibliography ==
- Jachter, Rabbi Chaim; Frazer, Ezra (2000). Gray Matter (PDF). Rabbi Chaim Jachter. ISBN 0-9670705-3-8.
- Jachter, Rabbi Chaim (2006). Gray Matter. Vol. 2. Yashar Books. ISBN 1-933143-10-X.
- Jachter, Rabbi Chaim; Frazer, Ezra (2008). Gray Matter. Vol. 3. Ian Richmond. ISBN 978-0615230740.
- Jachter, Rabbi Chaim (2012). Gray Matter. Vol. 4. ISBN 978-0615576886.
- Jachter, Rabbi Chaim (2017). Reason to Believe: Rational Explanations of Orthodox Jewish Faith. Menorah Books. ISBN 978-1940516714.
- Jachter, Rabbi Chaim; Jachter, Binyamin (2018). Depths of Yonah: Unleashing the Power of Your Yom Kippur. ISBN 978-0-46-498927-1
- Jachter, Rabbi Chaim (2019). From David to Destruction: Mining Essential Lessons from Sefer Melachim. ISBN 9781086413915
- Jachter, Rabbi Chaim (2020). Walking the Line: Hilchot Eruvin from the Sources to the Streets. ISBN 9798665014005

== Sources ==
- Jachter, Rabbi Chaim; Frazer, Ezra (2000). Gray Matter (PDF). Rabbi Chaim Jachter. ISBN 0-9670705-3-8.
