= Jennifer Bleyer =

American journalist, editor, and social worker

- Born: September 21, 1975 (age 50); Detroit area, Michigan, United States
- Education: Columbia University (BA); Stony Brook University (MSW)
- Occupations: Journalist, editor, social worker
- Known for: Founder of Heeb Magazine

Jennifer Bleyer (born September 21, 1975) is an American journalist, editor, and licensed master social worker. She is best known as the founder of Heeb Magazine, a satirical Jewish cultural publication she launched in 2002.

== Early life and education ==
Bleyer grew up in the Detroit area, attending Hillel Day School in Farmington Hills, Michigan, before her family moved to Cleveland. She attended Columbia University and was active in the Riot Grrrl movement in the mid-1990s, during which she created the punk travel zine Gogglebox and the Jewish punk zine Mazeltov Cocktail. She later donated her zine collection to Barnard Archives and Special Collections in 2020.

== Career ==
=== Heeb Magazine ===
In 2002, Bleyer founded Heeb Magazine, a quarterly satirical publication aimed at young American Jews, with a $60,000 grant from the Joshua Venture fellowship program, a San Francisco-based foundation partly funded by Steven Spielberg's Righteous Persons Foundation, with additional backing from Charles Bronfman. The magazine, subtitled "The New Jew Review," became known for its irreverent approach to Jewish identity and culture. Bleyer left the publication in 2003, after which Joshua Neuman assumed the roles of editor and publisher. Bleyer later joined the advisory board of the relaunched Heeb Media nonprofit in 2025.

=== Journalism ===
Following her departure from Heeb, Bleyer worked as a freelance journalist with a focus on health, science, and culture. She served as a senior editor at Psychology Today, and as a reporter for the City section of The New York Times, contributing to its Styles, Travel, Arts, Metro, Real Estate, Dining, and Home sections. She was also an adjunct faculty member at the Arthur L. Carter Journalism Institute at New York University. Her writing has appeared in Slate, Salon, Tablet, The Atlantic, The Washington Post, Cosmopolitan, The Forward, The Christian Science Monitor, and several anthologies.

She received a Circle of Excellence Bronze Medal from the Council for the Advancement and Support of Education for her article "Trip to the Doctor," and was awarded fellowships from the National Press Foundation and the Association of Health Care Journalists.

=== Social work ===
Bleyer later retrained as a social worker, earning a Master of Social Work degree with a concentration in Integrated Health from Stony Brook University's School of Social Welfare. She has provided psychotherapy for adults in private practice and works as a social worker at NYU Langone Hospital. She has received postgraduate training in ketamine-assisted psychotherapy and Emotion Focused Family Therapy.
