= Jonathan Zizmor =

American dermatologist

- Born: January 10, 1945 (age 81)
- Occupation: Dermatologist

Jonathan Zizmor (born 1945) is a retired American dermatologist in New York City famous for his television commercials and prolific, colorful subway ads promising that "Now you can have beautiful clear skin!" Zizmor received his MD from the Albert Einstein College of Medicine.

Zizmor was born to Julius and Felice Zizmor and grew up in New York City. He attended high school at Yeshiva University High School for Boys. Zizmor completed his internship in internal medicine at the hospitals of Albert Einstein College of Medicine and his residency in dermatology at New York University Hospital.

Comedian Nick Kroll has a sketch comedy series on Comedy Central "partially based on Zizmor" according to the Daily News. Zizmor was the subject of a Saturday Night Live sketch featuring Taran Killam as Brad Pitt in a parody of a Chanel ad.

Zizmor has authored seven books on skin care, including Dr. Zizmor's Skin Care Book and Dr. Zizmor's Guide To Clearer Skin.

Zizmor has been certified by the American Board of Dermatology and is a member of it. He served for over 10 years as Chief of Dermatology at St. Vincent's Hospital.

Zizmor was offered a cameo appearance on 30 Rock, but turned it down, according to Tina Fey.

On January 4, 2016, it was announced that Zizmor had retired, and plans to travel and study the Talmud.

A 2021 fashion review noted that people in New York City enjoy showcasing their particular local culture, and described this love as "Zizmorcore".

== Advertising ==
Zizmor's first subway advertisements appeared in 1981, with a tagline that promised "Now You Can Have Beautiful, Clear Skin". The subway advertisements appeared in one out of every five subway cars, by some estimates, and were all created by Zizmor himself. They featured his face, often superimposed on a rainbow and/or a photograph of the New York skyline.
