= City Hall (1996 film) =

1996 film by Harold Becker

- Theatrical release poster
- Directed by: Harold Becker
- Written by: Kenneth Lipper; Paul Schrader; Nicholas Pileggi; Bo Goldman
- Produced by: Harold Becker; Kenneth Lipper; Charles Mulvehill; Edward R. Pressman
- Starring: Al Pacino; John Cusack; Bridget Fonda; Danny Aiello; David Paymer; Martin Landau
- Cinematography: Michael Seresin
- Edited by: David Bretherton; Robert C. Jones
- Music by: Jerry Goldsmith
- Production companies: Columbia Pictures; Castle Rock Entertainment; Edward R. Pressman Productions
- Distributed by: Sony Pictures Releasing
- Release date: February 16, 1996
- Running time: 111 minutes
- Country: United States
- Language: English
- Budget: $40 million
- Box office: $33.4 million

City Hall is a 1996 American political thriller film directed by Harold Becker and starring Al Pacino, John Cusack, Bridget Fonda and Danny Aiello. The film is Becker's second collaboration with Pacino, having directed him in Sea of Love (1989). The film was released by Sony Pictures Releasing on February 16, 1996, and received generally positive reviews from critics, but was a box office bomb as it grossed $33.4 million against a $40 million budget.

== Plot ==
When NYPD Detective Eddie Santos surprises drug dealer Tino Zapatti on a Brooklyn street corner, Tino opens fire; the two men gun each other down, and a stray bullet from Zapatti kills a 6-year-old boy. As Mayor John Pappas responds to the tragedy, his loyal deputy mayor Kevin Calhoun investigates the connection between Santos and Tino, the nephew of mob boss Paul Zapatti.

Amid public outcry, Calhoun questions probation supervisor Larry Schwartz about why Tino, convicted on serious drug charges, was free on probation. The deputy mayor clashes with Frank Anselmo, a Brooklyn political boss connected to Paul Zapatti. When Anselmo pressures Internal Affairs to portray the decorated Santos as a dirty cop, Detective's Endowment Association lawyer Marybeth Cogan does her best to protect Santos's family. Pappas negotiates with Anselmo during a Broadway performance of Carousel, and delivers a rousing eulogy at the slain boy's funeral.

At Zapatti's behest, Anselmo plants money to incriminate Santos, and Calhoun and Cogan become reluctant allies in their search for the truth. They meet with Tino's cousin Vinnie, who reveals that Santos approached Tino because the detective was investigating Judge Walter Stern, a friend of Pappas who presided over Tino's case. Vinnie is soon found dead, and Santos's former partner points Calhoun and Cogan to a relocated parole officer, who explains that the probation report that would have sent Tino to prison was suppressed.

Cogan parts ways with Calhoun when he refuses to exonerate Santos until the missing report is found. Reaching out to Schwartz, who reveals he has the incriminating document, Calhoun is on the phone with him when Schwartz is murdered. With five people now dead, Calhoun counsels Pappas that Stern must be removed to contain the scandal, and the judge agrees to resign. Anselmo, also implicated, is instructed by Zapatti to commit suicide to prevent him from becoming an informant. To protect his family, Anselmo shoots himself, and the missing report is discovered in his car.

Pappas is confident he can overcome the political fallout to run for governor and, eventually, president. However, Calhoun has discovered that Stern owed his judgeship to a bribe from Anselmo on behalf of the Zapattis to keep Tino out of jail, facilitated by Pappas. Disillusioned with his mentor, Calhoun declares that Pappas must resign. Although Pappas wants to fight the imminent scandal, he admires Calhoun's integrity and acquiesces.

Calhoun soon runs for New York City's 6th City Council district and reconciles with Cogan. Losing the election, he is determined to run again and make the city a better place.

== Cast ==
- Al Pacino as Mayor John Pappas
- John Cusack as Kevin Calhoun
- Bridget Fonda as Marybeth Cogan
- Danny Aiello as Frank Anselmo
- David Paymer as Abe Goodman
- Martin Landau as Judge Walter Stern
- Anthony Franciosa as Paul Zapatti
- Richard Schiff as Larry Schwartz
- Lindsay Duncan as Sydney Pappas
- Lauren Vélez as Elaine Santos
- Murphy Guyer as Captain Florian
- John Finn as Commissioner Coonan
- John Slattery as Detective George
- Stanley Anderson as Train Conductor
- Harry Bugin as Morty the Waiter
- Nestor Serrano as Det. Eddie Santos
- Larry Romano as Tino Zapatti
- Angel David as Vinnie Zapatti

== Production ==
In January 1994, it was announced that Harold Becker had made a deal with Paramount Pictures to direct City Hall, a drama in the vein of Network written by Bo Goldman. The following month, it was announced that Castle Rock Entertainment had picked up City Hall after Paramount let their option lapse.

Tom Cruise was in preliminary talks to star in the film, but negotiations fell apart.

Principal photography began in New York on October 26, 1994 and wrapped in February 1995.

== Reception ==
=== Critical response ===
On the review aggregator website Rotten Tomatoes, 60% of 25 critics' reviews are positive, with an average rating of 6.1/10. The website's consensus reads: "City Hall explores political corruption with commendable intelligence, but this web of scandal struggles to coalesce into satisfying drama." Metacritic, which uses a weighted average, assigned the film a score of 62 out of 100, based on 27 critics, indicating "generally favorable" reviews. Audiences polled by CinemaScore gave the film an average grade of "B−" on an A+ to F scale.

Roger Ebert of the Chicago Sun-Times gave the film two-and-a-half stars out of four. He wrote, "Many of the parts of City Hall are so good that the whole should add up to more, but it doesn't." Janet Maslin of The New York Times had high praise for Danny Aiello's "beauty of a performance", calling it the "heart of the tale".

Owen Gleiberman of Entertainment Weekly graded the film B−. He wrote, "If you're going to travel the familiar labyrinth of corruption, it helps to have John Cusack as your guide." The Washington Post concluded, "What prevents City Hall from being an outright failure is its intriguing sense of detail." Variety called City Hall a "Greek tragedy" that "aims to tell the dark truth about a modern metropolis yet doesn't stint on fun".

Many reviewers praised the chemistry of the two leads. The Daily Telegraph wrote, "The relationship between Pacino and Cusack is more than seductive enough to hold audience attention."

The Atlanta Journal-Constitution gave the film 2½ stars out of 4. It felt that the film was "Less than the sum of its parts...But give it credit for trying." Philadelphia Daily News was grateful that the film "gives us a political drama with engaging moral and ethical dimensions. The movie is a welcome change from the fluff of The American President and the self-indulgent freak show that was Nixon."

=== Box office ===
The film was released on February 16, 1996, in 1,815 theaters. It debuted at number 4 at the United States box office, grossing $8 million. For its second weekend, it landed at number 6, grossing $13.8 million. The film grossed $20.3 million in the U.S. and Canada, and $13.1 million internationally, for a worldwide total of $33.4 million.
