= Josh Gruss =

American music publisher

- Born: Joshua Carl Gruss; March 14, 1974 (age 52); New York City, United States
- Education: Columbia University (M.B.A.); London Business School; Trinity College (Connecticut); Berklee College of Music
- Occupation: Entrepreneur • Musician • Songwriter • Music publisher • Record executive
- Years active: 2010 - present
- Organization: Round Hill Music
- Label: Round Hill Music
- Spouse: Shoshanna Lonstein Gruss (m. 2003; div. 2014)
- Parents: Martin D. Gruss (father); Agneta Angel (mother)
- Relatives: Joseph S. Gruss (grandfather)

Joshua Carl Gruss (born March 14, 1974) is an entrepreneur, musician and songwriter based in New York City, United States. He is a co-founder of Round Hill Music, an American music publishing company and co-owner of Quad Studios Nashville, a recording facility located on Music Row in Nashville, Tennessee. He is also a guitarist and songwriter with the Boston-based band Rubikon. Currently, Gruss serves as the chairman and CEO at Round Hill Music.

== Early life ==
Gruss was born to Agneta Angel and Martin Gruss, in 1974, in New York City. His grandfather, Joseph S. Gruss, was a financier and a businessman. Gruss completed his high school education from Taft School in 1992 and joined Trinity College (Connecticut) where he graduated with a B.A. degree in 1996. In 2010, Gruss earned executive MBA degrees from Columbia University as well as from London Business School. He also studied music business and guitar at Berklee College of Music in Boston, Massachusetts.

== Career ==
Gruss began his career at Atlantic Records, followed by work as an analyst at Bear Stearns, worked as a risk arbitrage analyst at his family's family office, Gruss & Company. He was also in the United States Coast Guard Reserve for six years, including service after the September 11 attacks.

In 2010, Gruss founded the music publishing company Round Hill Music with Richard Rowe and Neil Gillis. The company was established as the first private equity group dedicated to music royalty investments, that brought capital to artists such as The Beatles and The Offspring. In 2013, Gruss acquired the publishing rights to the song "Land of a Thousand Dances" by Chris Kenner which generated average royalties of $200,000 a year for the company. The next year, Gruss and the songwriter Marti Frederiksen acquired and restored the Quad Studios Nashville. The studio was originally opened in 1971 and located on Music Row in Nashville.

In 2018, Gruss acquired the music publishing company, Carlin America and the rights to over 150,000 songs for $245 million, including the hit "Total Eclipse of the Heart" written by Jim Steinman. Other acquisitions included the rights to the songs recorded by The Goo Goo Dolls, The Rolling Stones, Frank Sinatra, Bruno Mars, Tim McGraw, Black Sabbath, Daughtry (band), Craig David, The Cult, Kiss, Limp Bizkit, Blues Traveler, and Skid Row.

In May 2020, Gruss established Black Hill Records, a record label dedicated to rock music, and signed Austin-based duo Black Pistol Fire, Nashville-based blues and rock guitarist Jared James Nichols and British rock band The Cult. In November 2020, Gruss led Round Hill Music in collecting $291 million for a new fund dedicated to investing in music rights. The Wall Street Journal reported that it was the third and the largest music royalty fund for the company.

In January 2021, Gruss was included in the Billboard's Change Agents list for raising nearly $600 million for acquisitions, including $328 million with a public listing on the London Stock Exchange. In May 2021, Gruss acquired the Swedish label Telegram Studios whose master recordings and catalogue included Estelle, System of a Down’s Serj Tankian, Throwing Muses, Ziggy Marley, and Surfer Blood. Later that year, in August, he created a Round Hill Music Endowed Scholarship Fund of 1 million dollars to aid multiple students at Berklee College of Music on an annual basis with financial assistance in pursuing Music Business and Management degrees. In January 2022, Gruss was also included in the Billboard Power List.

=== Music career ===
Since 2015, Gruss has been an integral part of the band Rubikon as a guitarist and a songwriter. He has extensively toured with the band and opened for Buckcherry, Disturbed, Black Label Society, Sevendust, Shinedown, Nonpoint, The Cult, Tesla, Pop Evil, and Candlebox. "Blood on My Hands", co-written by Gruss, peaked at #37 on Billboard's Mainstream Rock chart in 2019.

Gruss has been the Reissue Executive Producer on four of the London-based rock band Bush albums including The Science of Things, Deconstructed, Razorblade Suitcase and Sixteen Stone. He was also the executive producer of the album Travelers Blues by Blues Traveler, which was nominated for the Best Traditional Blues Album at the 64th Annual Grammy Awards in 2022.

== Personal life ==
Gruss married Shoshanna Lonstein on May 10, 2003 with whom he had three children. They divorced in 2014.
