= Sam Apple =

American writer

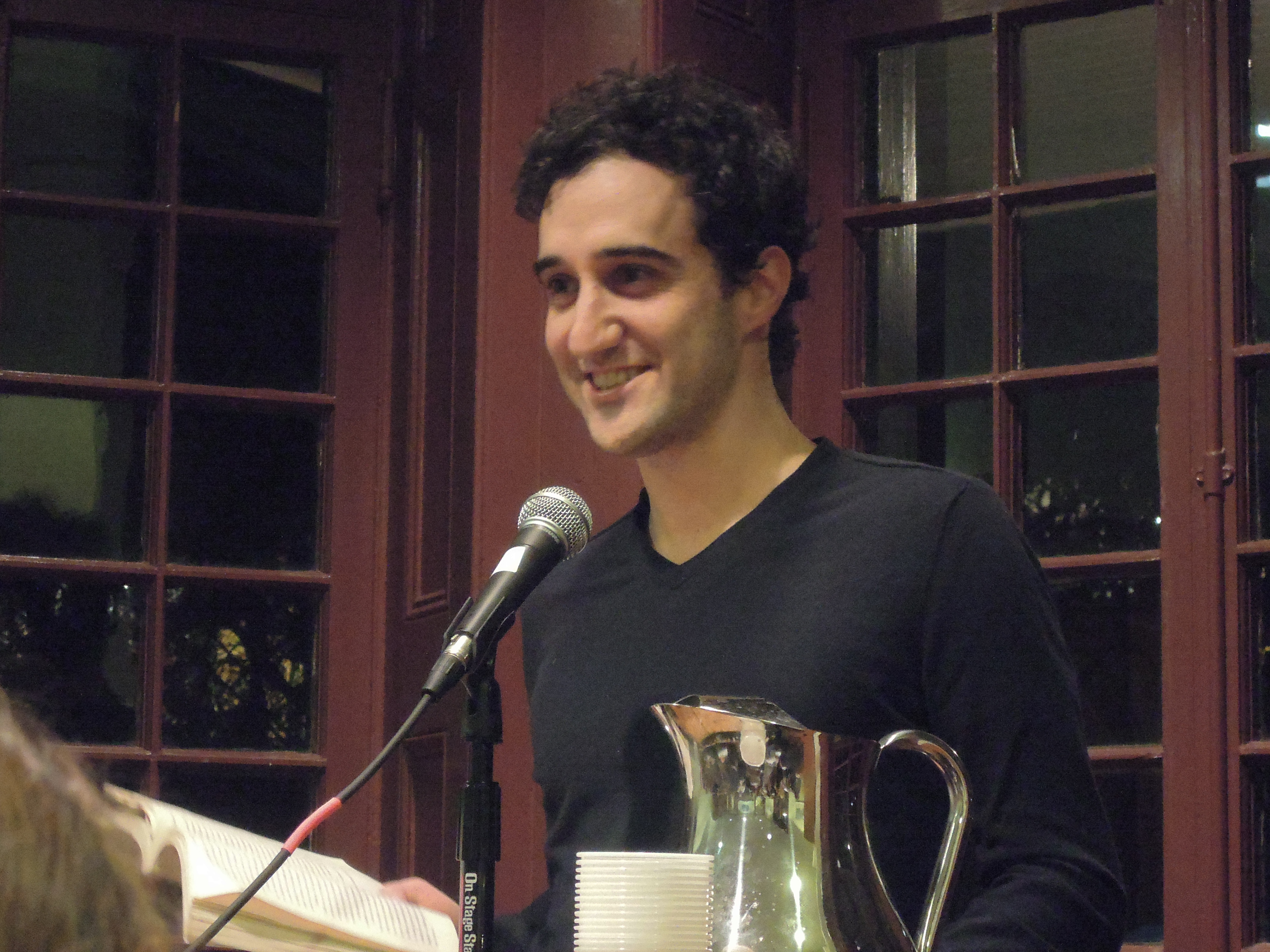
- Education: University of Michigan, Columbia University
- Occupations: professor, non-fiction writer
- Writing career
- Genres: children's, non-fiction

Sam Apple is a non-fiction writer.

== Life ==
Sam Apple received an undergraduate degree at the University of Michigan. After Michigan, he studied writing at Columbia University in the Master of Fine Arts program.

Apple is the author of Ravenous: Otto Warburg, the Nazis, and the Search for the Cancer-Diet Connection. Liveright editor Robert Weil solicited the book after reading one of Apple's articles in The New York Times Magazine. Apple has also written two books for Ballantine Books: Schlepping Through the Alps: My Search for Austria's Jewish Past with Its Last Wandering Shepherd and American Parent: My Strange and Surprising Adventures in Modern Babyland. Apple is on the faculty of the MA in Science Writing program at Johns Hopkins University. He has also been an adjunct professor of creative writing and entrepreneurial journalism at the University of Pennsylvania. He was a finalist for the PEN America Award for a first work of non-fiction.

Apple was editor of New Voices magazine, director of interactive media at Nerve.com, and publisher of The Faster Times. Apple has written for numerous publications including The New York Times Magazine, The Financial Times, The New Yorker, Wired, McSweeney's, The Atlantic, The Los Angeles Times, The New Republic, ESPN The Magazine, and Slate.com. Apple's short stories have appeared in Tablet.

== Family ==
He is the son of novelist Max Apple and is married to Jennifer Fried, a lawyer. They have three children.

== Works ==
- Ravenous: Otto Warburg, the Nazis, and the Search for the Cancer-Diet Connection, Liveright Publishing, 2021, ISBN 978-1-63149-315-7
- Schlepping Through the Alps: My Search for Austria's Jewish Past with Its Last Wandering Shepherd. Random House Publishing Group. 16 January 2009. ISBN 978-0-307-49052-0.
- American Parent: My Strange and Surprising Adventures in Modern Babyland, Random House Publishing Group, 2009
- The Saddest Toilet in the World, Illustrator Sam Ricks, Simon and Schuster, 2016, ISBN 9781481451239
- The Day the Kids Took Over, Little Brown and Company, 2021.
