= Joseph S. Gruss =

Austro-Hungarian businessman (1903–1993)

- Born: March 19, 1903
- Died: July 3, 1993 (age 90)
- Occupation: Businessman
- Known for: founder of Gruss & Company
- Children: 2

Joseph Saul Gruss (Hebrew: יוסף גרוס March 19, 1903 – July 3, 1993) was an Austro-Hungarian Empire–born American financier, businessman, and philanthropist who supported Jewish education.

== Early life ==
Joseph Saul Gruss was born on March 19, 1903, to a Jewish family in Lemberg, Austro-Hungarian Empire as one of seven children. His father, Isaac, was a Talmudic scholar and banker; his mother belonged to a family involved in the export grain business.

== Career ==
In 1939, Gruss founded a travel agency in New York City. While he and his wife were in the United States, the Nazis invaded eastern Europe, and they were unable to return home. Their first-born child and many of their relatives were murdered in the Holocaust. In 1942, he founded the Wall Street firm Gruss & Company, which focused on mergers and arbitrage primarily in the oil and gas industries. Thereafter, he engaged in oil and gas exploration and development primarily in Texas, Oklahoma, Wyoming, and West Virginia.

== Philanthropy ==
In the 1970s, Gruss focused on philanthropy particularly for Jewish education. He supported hundreds of Jewish schools and thousands of students and educators. He funded Yeshiva University's Caroline and Joseph S. Gruss Institute in Jerusalem; the Caroline Zelaznik Gruss and Joseph S. Gruss Visiting Professorship in Talmudic Civil Law; and the Fund for Jewish Education in association with the Federation of Jewish Philanthropies and the United Jewish Appeal of New York. In 1989, he funded the expansion of the White Plains campus of the Solomon Schechter School of Westchester to help accommodate the demands of Westchester's largest Jewish day school. The Gruss Life Monument Fund was founded in 1991 to continue his charitable activities after his death. The upper school of the Kamenitz Yeshiva in Brooklyn, New York is named Joseph S Gruss Yeshiva High School.

== Personal life ==
In 1934, he married Caroline Zelaznik (died 1987), a lawyer. They had three children. Their first child died in the Holocaust. Their surviving children, born in the United States, were Martin David Gruss and Evelyn Gruss Lipper. His daughter was married to the Hollywood producer, author, and former New York City deputy mayor Kenneth Lipper.

== Death and legacy ==
Gruss died of heart failure on July 3, 1993. His grandson, Joshua Carl Gruss, married the fashion designer Shoshanna Lonstein Gruss.
