= The Leffell School =

Location
- 555 West Hartsdale Avenue; Hartsdale, New York 10530; United States; 41.0324°N 73.8082°W

Information
- Former name: Solomon Schechter School of Westchester
- Type: Private school
- Motto: To learn and to teach, to observe and to act
- Religious affiliation: Jewish
- Established: 1966
- Founder: Rabbi Max Gelb
- NCES School ID: A0502564
- Head of school: Michael Kay
- Teaching staff: 118.4 (on an FTE basis)
- Grades: K–12
- Gender: Co-educational
- Enrollment: 864 (2024-2025)
- Student to teacher ratio: 6.5
- Campuses: 2
- Colors: Green and Gray
- Athletics conference: New York State Public High School Athletic Association
- Mascot: Lion
- Nickname: Lions
- Newspaper: The Lion's Roar
- Website: www.leffellschool.org

The Leffell School (formerly Solomon Schechter School of Westchester) is a K–12 private, co-educational, Jewish day school in New York, United States. It was established in 1966 by Max Gelb and operates on two campuses; a Lower School (K–5) in White Plains and an Upper School (6–12) in Hartsdale.

== History ==
=== Founding ===
Logo of Solomon Schechter School of Westchester.

Solomon Schechter School of Westchester was founded in 1966 with twenty-two students and two teachers in the basement of Temple Israel Center. Rabbi Max Gelb, the school's founder, guided the school with his wife, founding principal Leah Gelb. By the end of the 1970s, enrollment reached 150 and the kindergarten was housed in a converted home adjacent to the main building. It is named after Solomon Schechter, who founded the United Synagogue of America and was the architect of the American Conservative Jewish movement.

=== Expansion in White Plains ===
In 1979, with financial support from M. Mac Schwebel and others, the school leased the 25-acre (100,000 m^{2}) Rosedale Elementary School campus on Dellwood Road in White Plains, and two years later purchased the campus. In 1980, Rabbi Gelb and Mrs. Gelb stepped down, and Dr. Elliot Spiegel was appointed headmaster. It was Dr. Spiegel who charted the school's future course, introducing innovative education programs and transforming Schechter Westchester into a premier conservative Jewish day school. In 1989, with support from Joseph S. Gruss, a fourth building was constructed on the White Plains campus to help accommodate the demands of Westchester's largest Jewish day school.

=== Name change ===
In 2016, the Solomon Schechter schools system merged with Prizmah, an interdenominational Jewish Day School network. The Westchester school thereupon disaffiliated intself with the network, but briefly retained the name.

On July 1, 2019, it changed its name to The Leffell School, after Lisa and Michael Leffell, the latter a past president of the school's board of trustees.

=== End of Carmel Academy ===
In 2020, Carmel Academy in Greenwich, Connecticut announced that it would close down at the end of the school year. A letter from Carmel referred students to Leffell, stating that there would be integration of Carmel programs there, although Leffell stated that Carmel was simply closing and that it was not merging into Leffell.

== Tuition ==
Fifty percent of students at the school received tuition assistance in 2012.

== Athletics ==
The school participates in the New York State Public High School Athletic Association. The following sports are currently offered:

Fall:

- Girls tennis
- Boys soccer
- Girls soccer
- Girls volleyball
- Cross country

Winter:

- Boys basketball
- Girls basketball
- Indoor track

Spring:

- Boys baseball
- Boys tennis
- Girls softball
- Track and field
- Golf

In November 2015, the Schechter Westchester varsity soccer team lost to Elmira Notre Dame in the NY State Class C Finals in Middletown. Prior to this, no Schechter Westchester athletic team had ever made it past the class C regional semi-finals.

== Notable alumni ==
- Jennifer Hyman, CEO and co-founder of Rent the Runway
- Nick Kroll, actor, comedian, writer and producer
- Rachel Kadish, fiction and non-fiction writer
- Andrew Goldberg, writer and producer
- Jason Schreier, author and journalist
