= Mik Moore =

- Born: 1974 (age 51–52)
- Education: Vassar College (BA); Georgetown University Law Center (JD)
- Occupations: Political strategist, writer, creative agency founder
- Known for: Co-creator of The Great Schlep

Mik Moore is an American political strategist, writer, and creative agency founder. He is best known as the co-creator of The Great Schlep, a 2008 viral video campaign featuring Sarah Silverman that encouraged young Jewish Americans to persuade their grandparents in Florida to vote for Barack Obama. In 2025, he led the relaunch of Heeb Magazine as the nonprofit Heeb Media.

== Early life and education ==
Moore was born in New York City in 1974. He received a Bachelor of Arts degree from Vassar College and a Juris Doctor from Georgetown University Law Center. He served as editor of New Voices magazine and as board chair of the Jewish Student Press Service.

== Career ==
=== Jewish Funds for Justice ===
Before founding his own firm, Moore served as Chief Strategy Officer at Jewish Funds for Justice, where he worked on electoral and legislative campaigns, communications, and fundraising for progressive elected officials, labor unions, and nonprofit organizations. According to The Covenant Foundation, Moore "spearheaded the wildly successful Great Schlep video" during his tenure at the organization.

In 2011, Moore departed Jewish Funds for Justice. The Forward reported that he "left as a staff member in July" and would "work as a part-time consultant" for the organization going forward.

=== The Great Schlep ===
In 2008, Moore co-created The Great Schlep with Ari Wallach through the Jewish Council for Education and Research (JCER), an initiative encouraging young Jewish Americans to travel to Florida and persuade their grandparents to vote for Barack Obama. The campaign's centerpiece was a video featuring comedian Sarah Silverman, which was viewed by an estimated seven million people online.

The campaign received national media attention, including a reference in The New York Times by columnist Frank Rich, who wrote following Obama's victory: "Obama drew a larger percentage of Jews nationally (78) than Kerry had (74) and — mazel tov, Sarah Silverman! — won Florida." According to the advertising agency Droga5, which worked on the campaign, "Obama won Florida by 170,000 votes (51% vs. 49%) and received the highest elderly Jewish vote in 30 years." The campaign was also recognized by the D&AD awards, which noted that "thousands of media outlets covered The Great Schlep."

Moore and Wallach also produced Hail to the Glenn Beck!, an interfaith response to commentator Glenn Beck's criticism of social-justice-oriented churches, and Al Tirah USA, a civic engagement initiative featuring Rabbi Sharon Brous.

Following Obama's 2008 election, JCER continued operating ahead of the 2012 election under the name Schlep Labs, with Moore serving as treasurer and later president of its board. The organization received a $200,000 donation from Alexander Soros, son of George Soros, in 2012.

=== Moore+Associates ===
In 2011, Moore founded Moore+Associates, a creative agency based in New York City that works with political campaigns and nonprofit organizations on comedy and cultural strategy. According to the agency's website, Moore "has been featured in The New York Times, Hardball with Chris Matthews, NPR, The Washington Post, CNN, NBC News, Reuters, ABC News, Bloomberg BusinessWeek, USA Today" and his "campaigns have been honored by the Pollies, the Webbies, the Reed Awards, Google, The Peabody Awards and Facebook."

In 2016, Moore+Associates developed a campaign for the human rights organization T'ruah, documented in a Wexner Foundation case study. The study specifically credits Moore as the creative strategist behind the campaign, noting that "the firm's principal, Mik Moore, came up with the idea of a video that introduced a durable character."

=== Writing and political activism ===
Moore writes frequently about American Jewish politics for publications including The Forward, The Nation, +972 Magazine, and the Jewish Telegraphic Agency. He serves on the steering committee of The Jewish Vote, the electoral arm of Jews for Racial and Economic Justice, and on the boards of several Jewish nonprofit organizations.

=== Heeb Media ===
In early 2025, Moore announced a relaunch of Heeb Magazine as Heeb Media, a nonprofit media and e-commerce organization, aiming to bridge the gap between Gen X and Gen Z audiences through digital video, podcasts, and a yearly print issue. Moore assembled a team of four paid part-time staff, a four-person governing board, and a fourteen-person advisory board, and set a fundraising goal of $300,000 to $400,000 for the organization's first year. Original founder Jennifer Bleyer gave Moore her blessing and joined the advisory board of the relaunched publication, as did former editor-in-chief Joshua Neuman.

In 2025, Moore directed Made In Jew York, an eight-episode unscripted Heeb Media web series following TikTok fashion creator Clara Perlmutter and designer Sam Ehrlich as they developed a Heeb-branded clothing line, produced with support from Common Era, the research and development engine of the Jim Joseph Foundation.

The relaunch drew criticism from Arye Dworken, a former Heeb staff writer, music editor, and editor-at-large, who argued in a public Facebook post that the original magazine had functioned as "accidental ethnography" documenting Jewish identity across divergent political perspectives, and described the new iteration as a shift toward "factional advocacy" that he characterized as an "illegitimate succession." Jeff Newelt, Heeb's comics editor from 2006 to 2015, expressed more measured skepticism, saying there was substantial demand for "the quality, and edge, and insight, and aesthetics, and humor, and curation" that Heeb had achieved, but cautioning that "there's not really demand for a shallow imitation."
