= Max Apple =

American writer (born 1941)

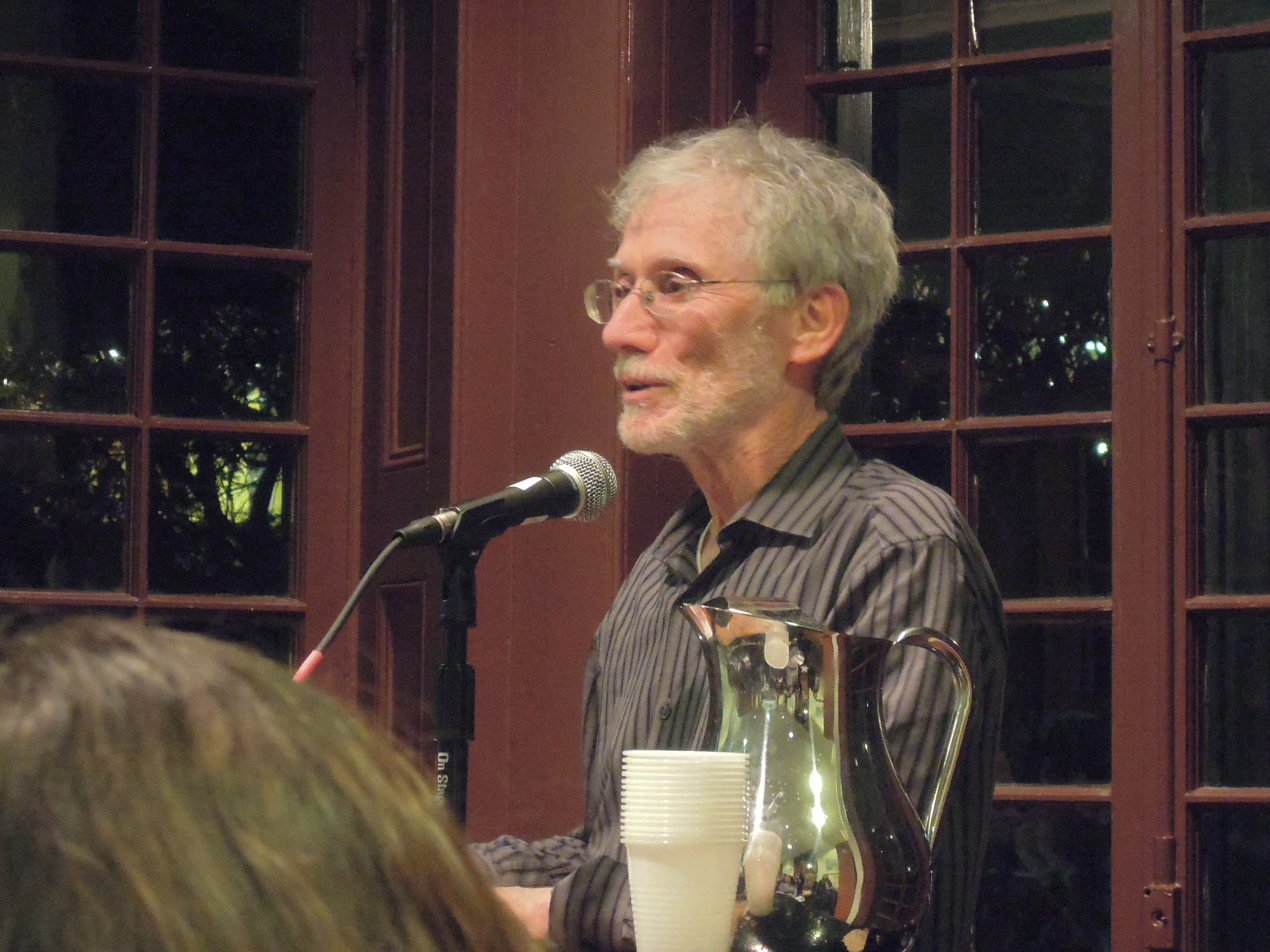
- Apple in 2012
- Born: October 22, 1941 (age 85); Grand Rapids, Michigan, U.S.
- Education: University of Michigan
- Occupations: Short story writer; novelist; essayist; professor
- Writing career
- Genres: Fiction, non-fiction

Max Apple (born October 22, 1941) is an American short story writer, novelist, and professor at The University of Pennsylvania in Philadelphia, Pennsylvania.

== Biography ==
Apple was born to a Jewish family in Grand Rapids, Michigan, and received his B.A. (1963) and Ph.D. (1970) from the University of Michigan. Apple taught creative writing at Rice University in Houston, Texas, for 29 years, where he held the Fox Chair in English. After retiring from Rice University, Apple moved to Philadelphia, where he teaches at The University of Pennsylvania. Along with his published novels and short story collections, he wrote the screenplays for Smokey Bites the Dust, The Air Up There, and Roommates (based on his 1994 biography Roommates: My Grandfather's Story.) Max's son is the non-fiction writer Sam Apple.

== Bibliography ==
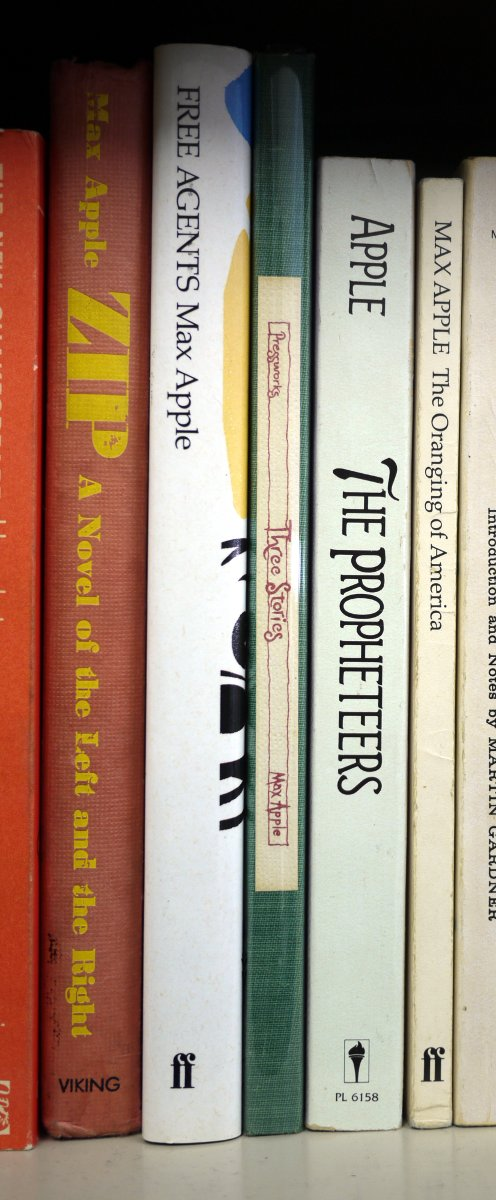
Some books by Max Apple

- The Oranging of America and Other Stories (1976)
- Zip: A Novel of the Left and the Right (1978)
- Free Agents (1984) ISBN 9780060152826
- The Propheteers (1987) ISBN 9780571148783
- Roommates: My Grandfather's Story (1994) ISBN 9780446602006
- I Love Gootie: My Grandmother's Story (1998) ISBN 9780446520744
- The Jew of Home Depot and Other Stories (Johns Hopkins University Press, 2007) ISBN 978-0-8018-8738-3 (Note: Here at the Internet Archive.)

== See also ==
- History of the Jews in Houston
