= Shoshanna Lonstein Gruss =

American fashion designer (born 1975)

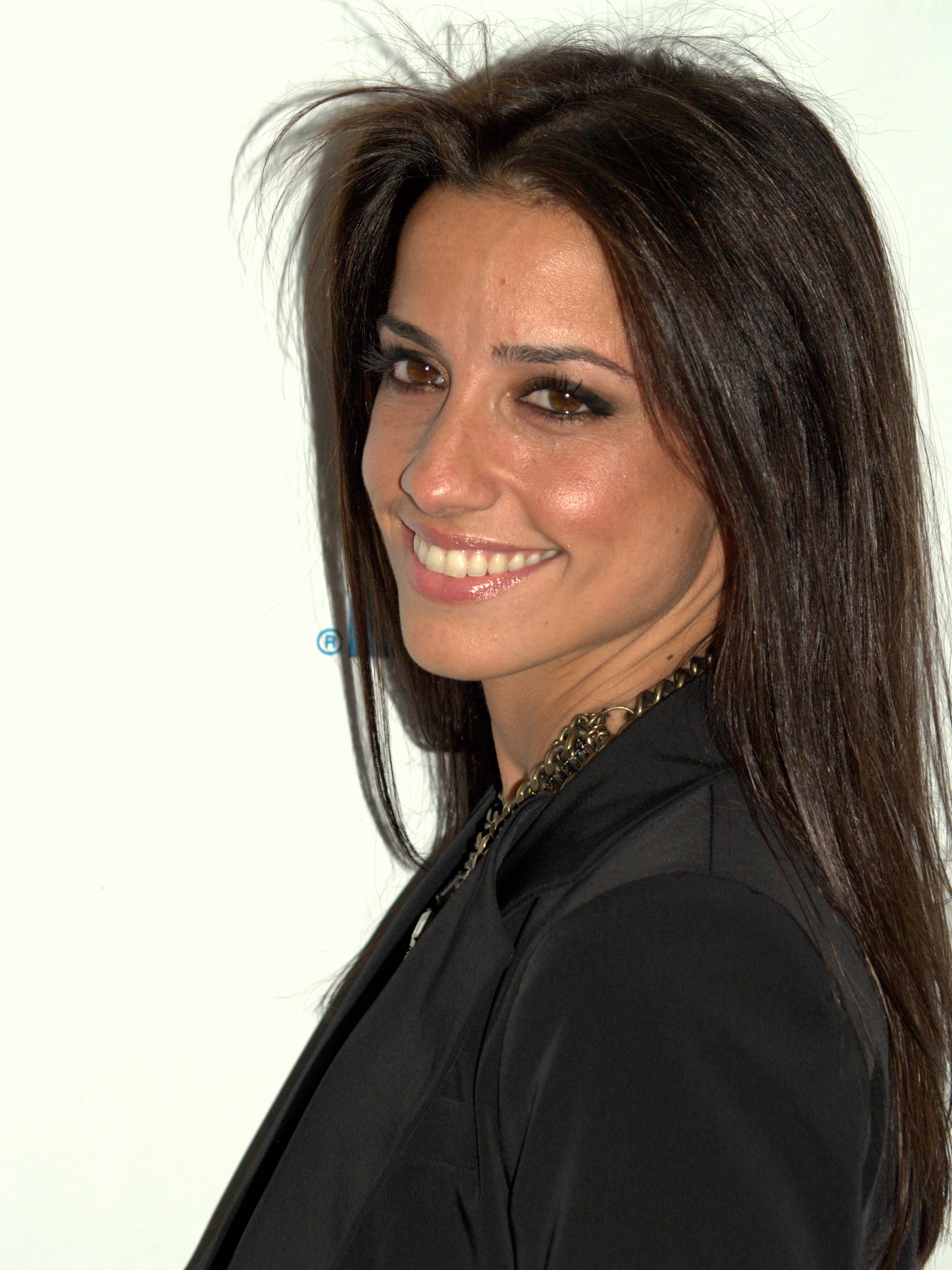
- Lonstein Gruss at the 2009 Tribeca Film Festival
- Born: Shoshanna Lonstein; May 29, 1975 (age 51); Manhattan, New York, U.S.
- Education: Nightingale-Bamford School; George Washington University; University of California, Los Angeles
- Occupation: Fashion designer
- Years active: 1998–present
- Spouse: Josh Gruss (m. 2003; div. 2014)
- Children: 3
- Website: shoshanna.com

Shoshanna Lonstein Gruss (born May 29, 1975) is an American writer and fashion designer and the founder and creative director of the fashion label Shoshanna, which launched in 1998.

== Career ==
In 1998, with a loan from her father, Zach Lonstein, chief executive officer of Infocrossing, she started the eponymous clothing line Shoshanna, focusing on "women’s fashions for different body types." In 2013, Elizabeth Arden, Inc. named Gruss the brand's first-ever Style Director. In this role, Gruss served as a spokeswoman and adviser for the design label.

=== Television ===
Gruss has appeared in numerous television programs, webcasts, and interviews, including a 2008 episode of America's Next Top Model.

== Personal life ==
In 1993, as a 17-year-old high school student, Lonstein met then 39-year-old Jerry Seinfeld in Central Park. Seinfeld was at the time starring in his eponymous sitcom. They dated for about four years, from 1993 to 1997. During their relationship, she transferred from George Washington University to UCLA, in part to be with Seinfeld. She cited constant press coverage and missing New York City as reasons the relationship ended.

Lonstein married Josh Gruss on May 10, 2003. The couple had three children and divorced in 2014.

As of 2016, she was living on the Upper East Side of Manhattan with their children.

== Philanthropy ==
Gruss is a member of the Board of Trustees of Reform synagogue Temple Emanu-El of New York and the Nightingale-Bamford School, where she is also a member of the Alumnae Board Committee. Gruss was Vice Chairman of the associate committee of the Memorial Sloan-Kettering Cancer Center and its Children's Committee from 2012 to 2014.
