= Kenneth Lipper =

American banker novelist

- Born: June 19, 1941 (age 85)
- Education: Columbia University (B.A.); Harvard Law School (J.D.); New York University (LL.M.); University of Paris
- Occupations: Investment banker, lawyer, writer, film producer
- Title: Chairman of Lipper & Co. New York City Deputy Mayor for Finance and Economic Development (1983–1985)
- Spouse: Evelyn Gruss (divorced 2000)
- Children: 4 daughters
- Awards: Academy Award for Best Documentary Feature (1998)

Kenneth Lipper (born June 19, 1941) has worked as a lawyer, investment banker, stockbroker, writer and film producer. He is best known for his brokerage firm, Lipper & Company; writing the novelizations of the films Wall Street and City Hall; and for serving, during the 1980s, under Mayor Ed Koch, as New York City Deputy Mayor for Finance and Economic Development for two years, then as a Port Authority of New York and New Jersey commissioner during 2013–2017. He is chairman of Lipper & Co, an investment bank and investment management company. Previously, he was a general partner at Lehman Brothers and Salomon Brothers, and an adjunct professor at Columbia School of International and Public Affairs in the field of international economics. He is Chairman of Lipper & Co, an investment bank and investment management company. Lipper won an Academy Award in 1998 for producing the Best Documentary Feature.

== Early life and education ==
Born to a Jewish family, Lipper earned his B.A. (Phi Beta Kappa) at Columbia College of Columbia University, his J.D. at Harvard Law School, his LL.M. at NYU and did postgraduate work in law and economics at the University of Paris. Lipper was initiated into Zeta Beta Tau fraternity's Delta chapter at Columbia University in 1959. In his teen years growing up in The South Bronx, Lipper is fondly remembered by Al Pacino in his 2024 memoir as one of "our little gang" of neighborhood friends. Pacino also noted that his character in the movie City Hall was based on Lipper's later experience there as a NYC deputy mayor.

== Career ==
=== Early career ===
He was an associate at Wall Street law firm Fried, Frank, Harris, Shriver & Jacobson, before serving as director of industry policy for the Office of Foreign Direct Investment in Washington, D.C. He has been associate and partner of Lehman Brothers (1969–75) and managing director and partner at Salomon Brothers (1976–82)

In 1978, Lipper and colleagues were investigated by the SEC regarding a transaction for New Jersey medical-products manufacturer Becton, Dickinson & Company (BDX). Dubbed the "Midnight Raid", the SEC charged that Lipper and others had mounted a "telephone stock-buying blitz" to trigger BDX stock sales at a premium, amounting to an illegal, undisclosed takeover bid on the company. Salomon and Lipper were found to have "aided and abetted securities-law violations" by a Federal judge of the Southern District of New York; the pair "hammered out a settlement with the SEC, without admitting or denying liability, with a promise to obey the law in the future", which prevented Lipper from being permanently barred from the securities industry. In 1982, when Salomon went public, Lipper was able to cash out with an estimated $15 million.

He was appointed New York City Deputy Mayor for Finance and Economic Development, serving from January 1983 under Mayor Ed Koch, whose campaign finance committee Lipper had chaired during Koch's failed 1982 bid for the Democratic nomination for governor. In 1985, he resigned to run for the Democratic nomination for City Council president.

=== Lipper & Company ===
Following his unsuccessful City Council campaign; in 1986, Lipper founded the investment firm Lipper Holdings LLC, operated as Lipper & Company, which claimed to manage more than $5 billion on behalf of institutions and high-net-worth individuals.

In 1991, Lipper, together with his Lipper & Co. client Les Wexner, Wexner Foundation trustee Jeffrey Epstein, and insurance broker Robert Meister pledged to raise $2 million to build Rosovsky Hall at Harvard University. Business Insider reported, in 2024, that 1997 flight logs included passengers Lipper and family aboard Epstein's private plane.

On January 14, 2002, executive vice-president Edward Strafaci refused to answer questions that arose in assessing Lipper & Co. fund valuations for the end of 2001; the research director and Strafaci both abruptly resigned from the firm that morning. The Lipper hedge fund portfolio was found to have been misrepresented, inflating the firm's convertible securities (formerly known as Lipco Partners, L.P.) by 46%. overstated by up to 19%. Lipper maintained his ignorance of the fund's steady demise and his own innocence, at first blaming losses on "the extraordinary combined severity of 2001 events" and market woes. In liquidating his mutual funds, he sold $500 million in bond fund assets to Neuberger Berman in April 2002. That December, he applied to the SEC to deregister his three mutual funds.

A New York Supreme Court judge ruled that Lipper had to start refunding his investors by early February 2003, ordering that 75% of the already liquidated assets of two Lipper Convertibles funds be returned, valued at $250 million or more. Three months later, the judge further ruled that Lipper be removed as the liquidating trustee of the fund, and ordered him to repay millions of dollars received as fees based on falsely inflated prices during 1995 through 2001. On April 24, 2002, Lipper & Co. filed with the SEC to liquidate two mutual funds: Lipper U.S. Equity and Lipper Merger fund, citing "lack of investor interest" and the fund's "diminishing size", leaving Lipper & Co. one mutual fund focused on European investments; Lipper continued to manage money for high net worth individuals.

Lipper appealed the court's rulings; a New York appellate court upheld the lower court's orders that November. Numerous civil lawsuits were filed against Lipper & Company and litigated during the ensuing decade, including a suit filed in January 2003 by the blind trust of Senator Fritz Hollings, which claimed that during the month between Strafaci's exit and public disclosure of the deflated hedge fund; Lipper had withdrawn over $3 million in January 2002, through Lipper Holdings, and that his four daughters had each also made substantial withdrawals during the two months prior. The suit further alleged that "Lipper's pal Mortimer Zuckerman" had also withdrawn $12 million that month. Strafaci was indicted, later pleading guilty to securities fraud, then sentenced to prison in 2004.

In October 2010, the New York State Supreme Court granted Lipper over $15 million in indemnification from the trustee for Lipper & Co., noting that investigations of claims asserted against Lipper had resulted in a finding that he had not engaged in "negligence, malfeasance, or a violation of law." In 2013, Lipper returned to managing investments.

=== Later career ===
He was adjunct professor at Columbia School of International Affairs in the field of international economics, and served as a director of corporations and government agencies. Lipper is a member of the board of directors of The Brain Trust at the Mortimer B. Zuckerman Mind Brain Behavior Institute, a research advisory board of Columbia University, of which Zuckerman is chairman.

From 2003 to 2006, Lipper served as Senior Executive Vice President at Cushman & Wakefield, Inc.

On June 21, 2011, Lipper appeared at Bloomberg's High Yield Conference in West Hollywood, California, where he discussed his opinions about the stock and bond markets, and government debt. On December 7, 2011, Lipper appeared on Fox TV's "Good Day New York," where he discussed unemployment and economic development.

In 2013, Governor Andrew Cuomo appointed Lipper as a Commissioner of the Port Authority of New York and New Jersey appointing him to a four-year term, during which Lipper was considered a government reformist.

== Arts ==
Lipper wrote the novelization of Wall Street, adapted from Oliver Stone's 1987 film of the same name, served as technical advisor and appeared in a brief cameo. His experience in government was the inspiration for another film, 1996's City Hall, starring Al Pacino, for which he penned the novelization, co-wrote the screenplay, and was a producer. He appeared on Charlie Rose in 1996 to discuss his novel and movie City Hall. He was also producer of The Winter Guest, starring Emma Thompson, and the Holocaust documentary The Last Days, for which he shared an Academy Award in 1998 for producing the Best Documentary Feature.

He is also a co-founder and financier of Penguin Lives, a Viking biography series, which produced 22 diminutive biographies before dissolving in 2002.

== Philanthropy ==
Lipper has endowed scholarships in the name of his mother, Sally Lipper, at Harvard, Columbia, Princeton, and Israel's Weizmann Institute.

In 1994, Lipper gifted $3.2 million to Harvard to establish a chair in Holocaust Studies. When Harvard refused to fill the position, Lipper transferred the money to Harvard Medical School.

In 1995 Mr Lipper created the Jerome Lipper multiple myeloma centre at Dana Farber cancer institute, one of the leading cancer research and treatment centres in the United States.

== Personal life ==
In 2000, he divorced his wife, Dr. Evelyn Gruss, the daughter of financier and philanthropist Joseph S. Gruss; They have four daughters: Joanna Helene Lipper, Daniella Lipper Coules, Tamara Lipper Smith, and Julie Lipper Wilcox.

== Books ==
Ken Lipper, Wall Street (1987)

Ken Lipper, City Hall (1996)

Ken Lipper, "Born in the Real World: The Two Wall Street Movies", Wall Street: The Collector's Edition (2010)
