= Round Hill Music =

American music publishing company founded in 2010

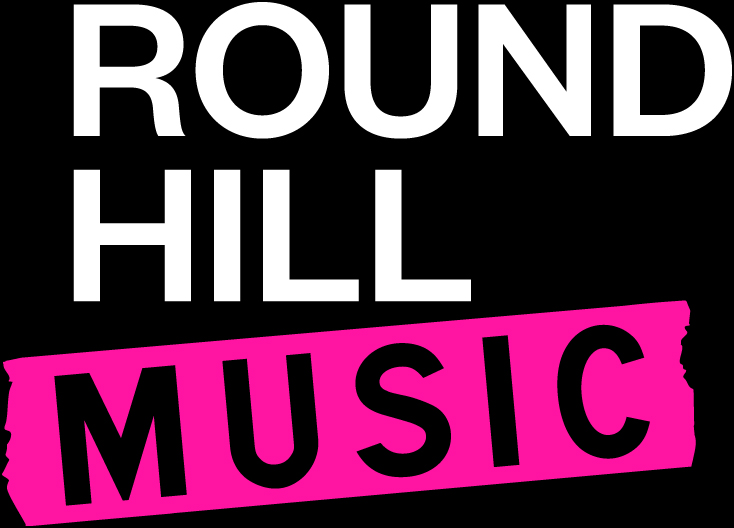
- Founded: 2010; 16 years ago
- Genre: Various
- Country of origin: United States
- Location: 650 FIFTH AVENUE, SUITE 1420, New York City, New York 10019, United States
- Official website: roundhillmusic.com

Round Hill Music is an American music publishing company founded in 2010 by Josh Gruss, Richard Rowe, and Neil Gillis. The company operates a music publishing division, a sync and royalty administration, a music production library business, a record label and label services division, and also a Nashville songwriter services group with offices in New York, Los Angeles, Nashville and London.

== Divisions ==
=== Music publishing ===
In January 2012, Round Hill and Adage Classics jointly acquired the GIL Music and GPS Music catalogues, which included the North American rights to six Beatles songs ("She Loves You," "I Saw Her Standing There", "From Me to You," "Misery," "I Wanna Be Your Man" and "There's a Place"). In September 2017, Round Hill paid $250 million to acquire publisher Carlin America. Carlin owned the rights to songs recorded by Elvis Presley, among other artists.

In 2017, Round Hill entered into a partnership with Zync for synchronization.

In August 2019, Round Hill signed a sub-publishing deal with Warner/Chappell Music for them to represent Round Hill's catalogue outside of the United States, Canada, the United Kingdom, Ireland, and the Nordics.

Round Hill also has signed and acquired the catalogues of Skid Row, KK Downing (Judas Priest), Jani Lane (Warrant), Triumph, Tesla, Craig David, Ronnie James Dio, Neil Sedaka, John Rzeznik of the Goo Goo Dolls, Billy Duffy (The Cult), Jim Vallance, Big Loud Shirt, Ashley Gorley, Arthouse Entertainment, Keith Sweat, Rob Thomas, Collective Soul, Josh Kear, Big Tractor, Lit, and Eric Carmen.

=== Round Hill Records ===
In 2014, Round Hill Records was established with the catalogue acquisition of the UK rock band, Bush, in partnership with frontman Gavin Rossdale.

In January 2016, Round Hill paid $35 million for punk rock band The Offspring's Columbia Records albums and the band's entire publishing catalogue. Later that year, Round Hill signed a distribution deal with Universal Music Enterprises, covering the Offspring's albums. Today Round Hill Records is releasing records from artists such as Royal Teeth and The London Souls, as well as providing label services to many other artists.

In 2020, Round Hill Records created label dedicated to rock called Black Hill Records, which has signed artists including The Cult, Black Pistol Fire, and Jared James Nichols.

In May 2021, Round Hill acquired the catalogue of the Swedish label Telegram Studios, including Dolores Recordings and Woah Dad.

In August 2023, Round Hill acquired Canadian record label Linus Entertainment.

=== Round Hill Music Royalty Fund ===
Round Hill Music Royalty Partners is the private equity arm of Round Hill Music which is dedicated to acquiring copyrights of music.

It raised its first Fund in 2014 with $202 million and its second fund with $263 million in 2017.

In late 2023, Concord bought the Round Hill Music Royalty Fund. The deal includes over 150,000 songs and 51 catalogs, including works by The Beatles, Alice In Chains, The Offspring, and hits recorded by Elvis Presley, Meatloaf, James Brown, and Billie Holiday and also includes a stake in the Carlin Catalog, which includes hits made famous by artists including Johnny Cash, Aretha Franklin, Ella Fitzgerald, Elvis Presley, Peggy Lee, and George Harrison.

== Copyright lawsuits ==
In 2014, Round Hill Music and BMG Rights Management sued Cox Communications for the copyright infringements of its subscribers. In December 2015, the case was decided in BMG and Round Hill Music's favor.

On July 31, 2020, Round Hill filed a $32.8 million lawsuit against the independent distributor Tunecore and its parent company, Believe Digital, citing the unauthorized distribution of 219 Round Hill compositions. Round Hill sought $150,000 per infringed composition.

== See also ==
- List of record labels
