= Marisa Scheinfeld =

American artist

Marisa Scheinfeld (born September 14, 1980) is an American artist, photographer and educator currently living in New York.

Marisa's projects have taken her from the United States to Israel, Poland, the Czech Republic, Slovakia and India. Her photographic projects and books are among the collections of Yeshiva University Museum, Lynn Kroll, The Simon Wiesenthal Center in Los Angeles, CA, The La Jolla Athenaeum in La Jolla, CA, The Magnes Collection of Jewish Art and Life (UC Berkeley) The Edmund and Nancy K. Dubois Library at the Museum of Photographic Arts in San Diego, CA and The International Raoul Wallenberg Foundation in New York City.

== Personal life ==
Scheinfeld was born in Brooklyn, NY in 1980. She lived in the Bronx before relocating with her family in 1986 to Kiamesha Lake, in the Catskill Mountains. She began her college studies at the School of Visual Arts in New York City, but dropped out after a year and a half, choosing to transfer to the State University at Albany where she received a B.A. in Studio Art in 2002. In 2003, Marisa moved to San Diego, CA and worked in the Education Department at the Museum of Photographic Arts (MoPA) for four years. At MoPA, Marisa taught the museum's photography outreach programs, managed its Docent Program and curated educational exhibitions. In 2009, she was accepted into the graduate program at The School of Art, Art History and Design at San Diego State University. She completed a MFA in Studio Art in 2011 and shortly thereafter, relocated back to New York.

== Photography ==
Catskill Series

Scheinfeld grew up in New York's Catskills region, near the resorts of the Borscht Belt. For much of the 20th century the Borscht Belt was a thriving vacation destination, from high-end resorts such as Grossinger's and the Concord to modest bungalow colonies. In its heyday, the area was known especially for its nightlife, with top comedians and other performers appearing regularly there. By the time Scheinfeld was growing up there in the 1980s and ‘90s, however, economic and other factors had sent the region into rapid decline, leading many of the hotels and clubs to close.

In 2009, during graduate school, Scheinfeld began to document the remains of her hometown region – searching for any relics of the Borscht Belt she could find. She worked from 2009 to 2015 to document the degradation of some of the area's most famous hotels and bungalow colonies. On October 4, 2016, Cornell University Press published a monograph of this photographic series. The book, entitled The Borscht Belt: Revisiting the Remains of America's Jewish Vacationland includes 129 photographs, original ephemera, and writings from a Jewish American Historian and Sociologist.

== Reviews of Catskill Series ==
In a 2016 article by R.C. Baker of the Village Voice, R.C. writes, "The book notes Woody Allen's quip, no doubt delivered at some point from a Borscht Belt stage: "Eighty percent of success is showing up." Some might say that Scheinfeld arrived half a century too late, but her photos reveal that she showed up just in time to discover mutable beauty in tumbledown dreams."

The Jerusalem Post (2016) wrote, "The era of the Catskills as a popular vacation spot for East Coast Jews continued through the 1970s, although a few hotels and resorts still functioned into the ’90s. What was left behind is what Scheinfeld so eloquently captures in her remarkable photographs. (...) Scheinfeld, who spent five years photographing the region, is not only an exceptionally talented photographer, she is also a thoughtful and expressive writer. In an 11-page prologue she sets the stage for a book, which is in essence a photo album of what once was and is no longer. (...) The juxtaposition of three reflective and thoughtful essays with such striking photographs will not only be meaningful for people who remember vacationing in the Catskills, but will also strike a chord with anyone who once spent time in a special place that is now totally transformed."

On The Borscht Belt Writer Karen Schoemer reporting for DVEight writes, "With The Borscht Belt, Scheinfeld has become the unofficial visual historian, documentarian, and diarist of the sad, dwindling flame of the Catskills’ once-thriving resort community. When I look at Scheinfeld's photographs, I experience loss and disbelief. Graffiti and mildew streak the once-magnificent multi-tier lobby at Grossinger's in Liberty. A moldering roll of paper towels lies on the flooded kitchen floor of the Pines in South Fallsburg. A hallway overpass at the Pines is a wreck of drooping fiberglass insulation. And yet the work is compelling for more than its depiction of disaster and decay. As a photographer, Scheinfeld has a gentle touch: she uses natural light and never rearranges or stages objects for effect."

On The Borscht Belt, Tablet Magazine Marjorie Ingall for Tablet Magazine writes, "The Borscht Belt is full of lush, mysterious, mournful, sometimes oddly funny photos: crumbling walls, graffiti-filled pools, rusted swings and basketball hoops, stacks of webbed nylon pool lounges crabbed like spider legs; children’s toys half-submerged in murky water, bits of bird skeleton and detritus on industrial carpet, a scattering of festive red, white and blue poker chips on scrabbled ground. There are lovely, melancholy essays by Scheinfeld herself, writer Stefan Kanfer and historian Jenna Weissman Joselit (whose meditation on the resorts’ old chairs is damn near virtuosic)."

In a 2015 article in the Wall Street Journal, William Meyers reviewed Scheinfeld's photographic series. Like so many who share a commonality of the quintessential Catskill experience, Meyes could not help but deviate toward his own family Catskill experience. Meyers wrote "In 1937, my Aunt Dorris, then 17, got her driver's license and drove with her parents to the Hotel Plaza in the heart of the Catskills. There she met her future husband, my Uncle Sid, who was working as a bellhop. The family histories of several generations of New York-area Jews feature important episodes that took place at Borscht Belt resorts, but changing demographics and tastes made it impossible for even so famous a vacation destination as Grossinger's to survive. Marisa Scheinfeld grew up in the region, and since 2009 has been documenting the physical decay of Grossinger's, the Palms Country Club, the Tamarack Lodge, the Fur Workers’ Resort, the Nevele Grande Hotel, and others. It is sad to see nature reasserting itself where so much romance, such stellar entertainment, and such generous heaps of high-cholesterol food once flourished. Ms. Scheinfeld's large-format images show us the tall grass growing in the Pines Hotel's swimming pool, the graffiti-covered wrecks of Grossinger's and the Commodore Hotel's social spaces, and a pink telephone with the handset off the receiver on a stripped bed in Tamarack Lodge. There are weeds growing inside Grossinger's and it will be a long time before anyone again has a drink at the long row of rusting bar stools. Or the Meyers Family Circle has another reunion at Kutsher's."

In a 2014 article that appeared in The New York Times critic Edward Rothstein writes, "These photographs, taken from 2010 to 2014, portray an almost casual apocalypse. It's as if places like those I had visited had not just closed but had been abandoned to an encroaching wilderness, with nothing taking their place. We see the remains of resorts like Grossinger's or the Pines being gradually assailed by entropy or subsumed by natural surroundings. Strips of insulation drop from ceilings; moss and fern sprout from moist carpets; graffiti and plunder deface grand spaces. Some photographs also seem to be commenting on earlier vanity or vulgarity: In one, bar stools with turquoise cushions stand in a row like shunned roués, rusting in the wreckage. These images are affectionate without being nostalgic. The wreckage they show is almost lush with new growth. And while they really can’t compete with history’s vast iconography of ruin, their effect is unusual: The landscape of abandonment still retains signs of vitality — and we’re aware of the remarkable impact that this vitality had on American popular culture."

In a 2013 article by Jonathan Mark, the editor of the Jewish Week, Mark writes "The Catskills were always "the mountains," or "the country," as if the hardscrabble counties of Sullivan and Ulster were not New York State but a country, a mythical kingdom onto itself. Mark writes, "There are ruins in the Catskills forests, relics of Jewish hotels, both the grand and the humble. In the desolation is a holy cooing, from the Jewish ghosts and the divinity of nature reclaiming its domain. Moss grows over carpets, once so carefully chosen. The darkened tearooms and nightclubs are now waterlogged, with weeds springing up within shells of buildings that are falling down, not torn down. Marisa Scheinfeld, a photographer documenting this almost apocalyptic transformation, says, "The decay and return of the wild is almost as opulent and lavish as the hotels were in their prime."

== Exhibitions ==
Scheinfeld's work has been exhibited in solo exhibitions Yeshiva University Museum at the Center for Jewish History in New York City, The National Yiddish Book Center in Amherst, MA, The Lower East Side Jewish Conservancy in New York City, PhotoWorks in Glen Echo Park, MD, Edward & Bernice Wenger Center for the Arts at the Sid Jacobson JCC. In 2012, she presented her work on the Borscht Belt at the 12th Annual Catskills Preservation and History Conference. In 2015, she presented her work on the Borscht Belt at a Tenement Talk at the Tenement Museum in New York City in a panel entitled "The Stories of Ruins.* Marisa has been part of group exhibitions at The Midwest Center for Photography, The Ben Uri Gallery at The London Jewish Museum of Art. The Jewish Art Salon, and the 92Y.

In a 2014 review from The New York Times, Edward Rothstein wrote "These images are affectionate without being nostalgic. The wreckage they show is almost lush with new growth. And while they really can't compete with history's vast iconography of ruin, their effect is unusual: The landscape of abandonment still retains signs of vitality — and we’re aware of the remarkable impact that this vitality had on American popular culture."

A 2014 article from Newsweek by Abigail Jones describes the exhibition as ..the show is haunted by the detritus of what once was: the missing people, the abandoned activities, the desolate places that at one time buzzed with life. Hallways are bruised and broken, strewn with crumbling plaster and fallen insulation. Wires hang from ceilings, graffiti covers the walls, moss grows over floors and up stairs. In a guestroom at the Tamarack Lodge, a pale pink rotary phone sits on a bare mattress, the receiver off the hook. And yet Scheinfeld's photography shows that these broken hotels are very much alive."

== Sources ==
- The New York Times: Resorts Born in Decay by John Leland
- The New York Times: https://www.nytimes.com/2014/09/26/arts/design/echoes-of-the-borscht-belt-photos-at-yeshiva-university.htm l Punch Lines, Reverberating in the Ruins ‘Echoes of the Borscht Belt,’ Photos at Yeshiva University by Edward Rothstein
- The Wall Street Journal: Photography Review: Marisa Scheinfeld, Denis Brihat and ‘Experiments in Abstraction’ Weeds in the Borscht Belt and Other Flora, Up Close by William Meyers
- Newsweek: Photographing the End of the Borscht Belt in the Catskills by Abigail Jones
- Slate Magazine: This Is All That’s Left of New York’s Once-Thriving Borscht Belt by Jordan Teicher
- Tablet Magazine: The Ruins of the Borscht Belt
- The Jewish Week: Brokedown Palace: Young photographer drawn to Catskills’ ruins and relics, and to Elul’s existential questions by Jonathan Mark
- The Jewish Daily Forward: Rediscovering Beauty Amid Ruins of Once-Glorious Catskills by Abigail Jones
- The San Diego Union Tribune: Photographer Finds That Home Isn't What It Used To Be by Will Parson

== Books ==
- The Borscht Belt: Revisiting the Remains of America's Jewish Vacationland, 2016. ISBN 9781501700590
- The Catskills: Its History and How it Changed America, 2015. ISBN 9780307272157
