= New Voices (magazine) =

American Jewish student magazine

- Executive Director, JSPS/Editor in Chief, New Voices: Julia Hegele (June 2024 – present)
- Categories: Student magazine; Jewish themes
- Frequency: Online-only
- Founded: 1991
- Company: Jewish Student Press Service
- Country: United States
- Language: English
- Website: http://www.newvoices.org

New Voices is the only American national magazine written for and by Jewish college students. Published since 1991 by the independent, non-profit, student-run Jewish Student Press Service, New Voices is read by over 20,000 students across the United States and abroad.

The magazine is produced by one recent college graduate in New York City and dozens of student writers from campuses across the country on a shoestring annual budget.

== History ==
The Jewish Student Press Service was established in 1971 to provide quality, student-written articles to a then-thriving national network of local Jewish campus publications across the United States. Many of today's most accomplished Jewish journalists got their start at the Jewish Student Press Service. Current and former writers and editors of The New York Times, The Washington Post, The New York Jewish Week, The New Jersey Jewish News, Dissent, The Jewish Telegraphic Agency, Lilith, and Sh'ma are all past contributors to the Jewish Student Press Service.

In 1991, faced with a decline in the number of individual campus publications, the Jewish Student Press Service changed its focus and began publishing its own magazine, called New Voices, which now operates online as a fully digital magazine. As an independent publication and educational organization, each Editor is recently-graduated and hired for an average two-year contract. New Voices Magazine is supported by the Jewish Student Press Service Board of Directors, an intergenerational board composed largely of previous Press Service editors and writers.

== Sections ==
- Arts & Culture
- Campus & Community
- Fiction
- Investigative Series
- Opinion
- Poetry
- Fresh Torah
