= List of UK Jazz & Blues Albums Chart number ones of 2022 =

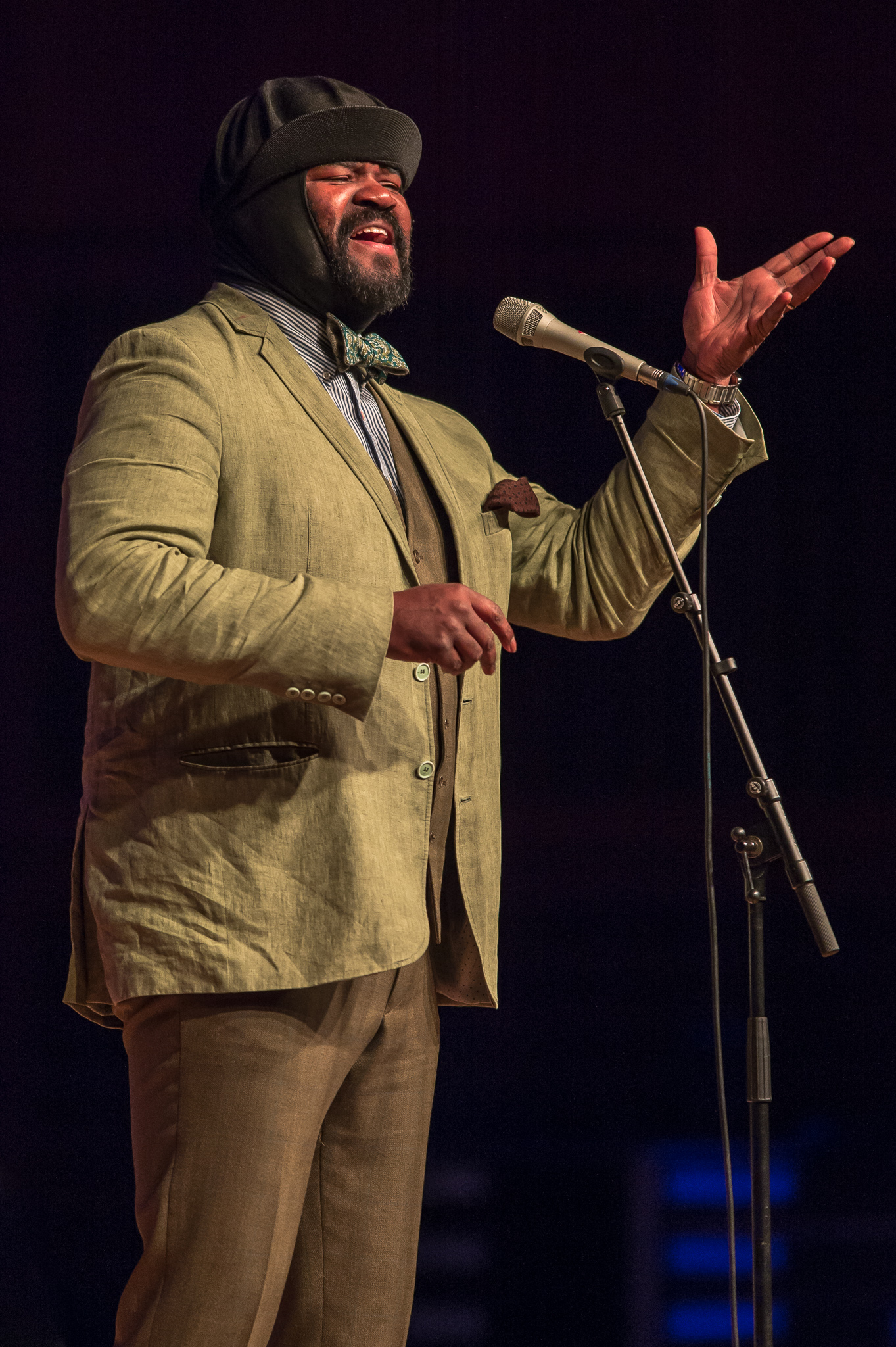
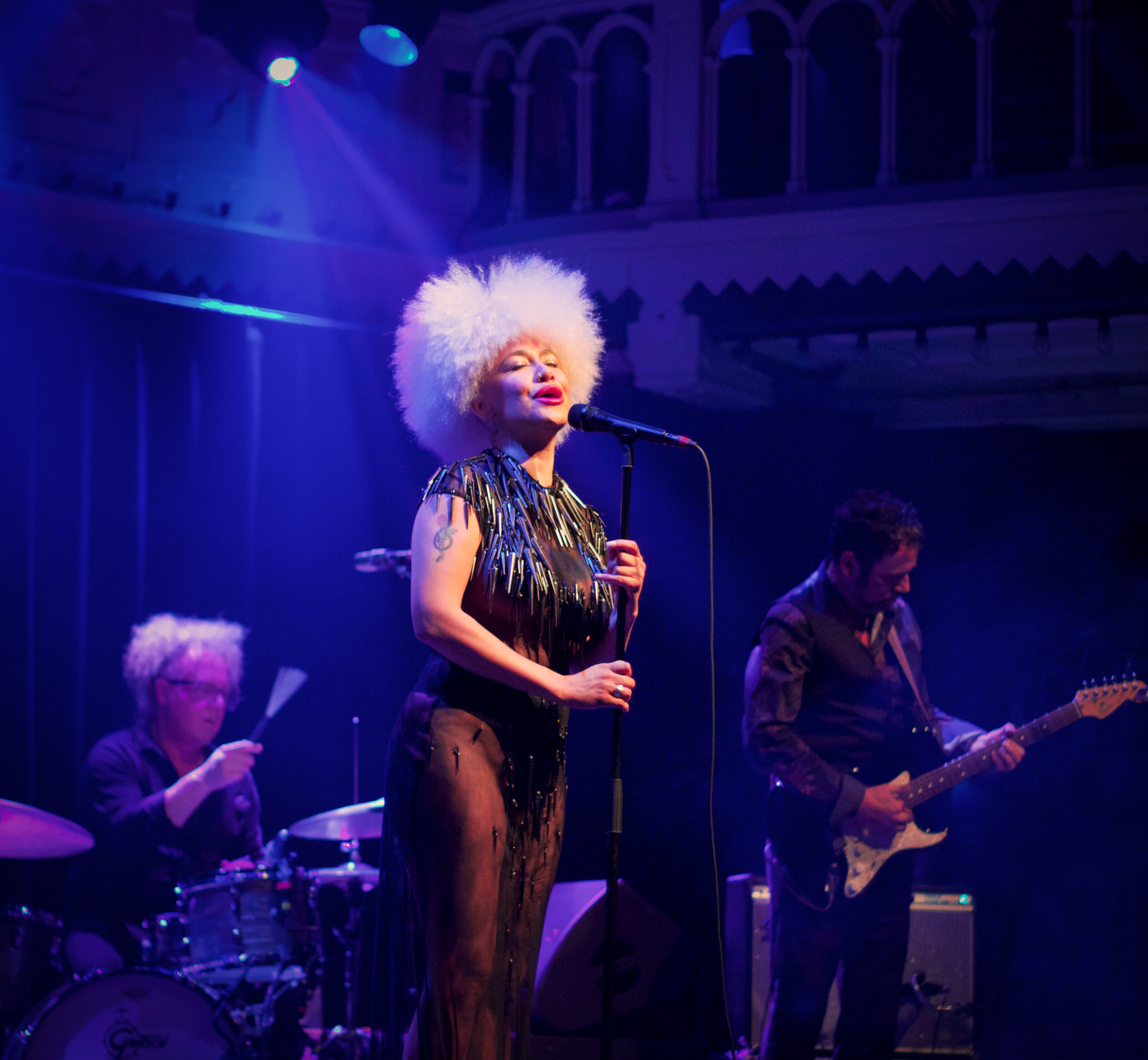
Gregory Porter (top) and Lady Blackbird (bottom) each spent five weeks of 2022 atop the UK Jazz & Blues Albums Chart, with Still Rising: The Collection and Black Acid Soul, respectively.

The UK Jazz & Blues Albums Chart is a record chart which ranks the best-selling jazz and blues albums in the United Kingdom. Compiled and published by the Official Charts Company, the data is based on each album's weekly physical sales, digital downloads and streams. In 2022, 52 charts were published with 34 albums at number one. The first number-one album of the year was Still Rising: The Collection, the first greatest hits album by Gregory Porter, which spent the first four weeks atop the chart. The last number-one album of the year was Ezra Collective's second studio album Where I'm Meant to Be, which topped the last two charts of 2022.

The most successful albums on the UK Jazz & Blues Albums Chart in 2022 were Porter's Still Rising: The Collection and Lady Blackbird's debut album Black Acid Soul, both of which spent a total of five weeks atop the chart over multiple spells. Where I'm Meant to Be by Ezra Collective spent four weeks at number one, while Eric Clapton's soundtrack to the recently re-released documentary Nothing but the Blues was number one for three weeks. The Tedeschi Trucks Band was also number one for three weeks in 2022, with the second, third and fourth parts of the group's I Am the Moon album spending a week each atop the chart.

== Chart history ==
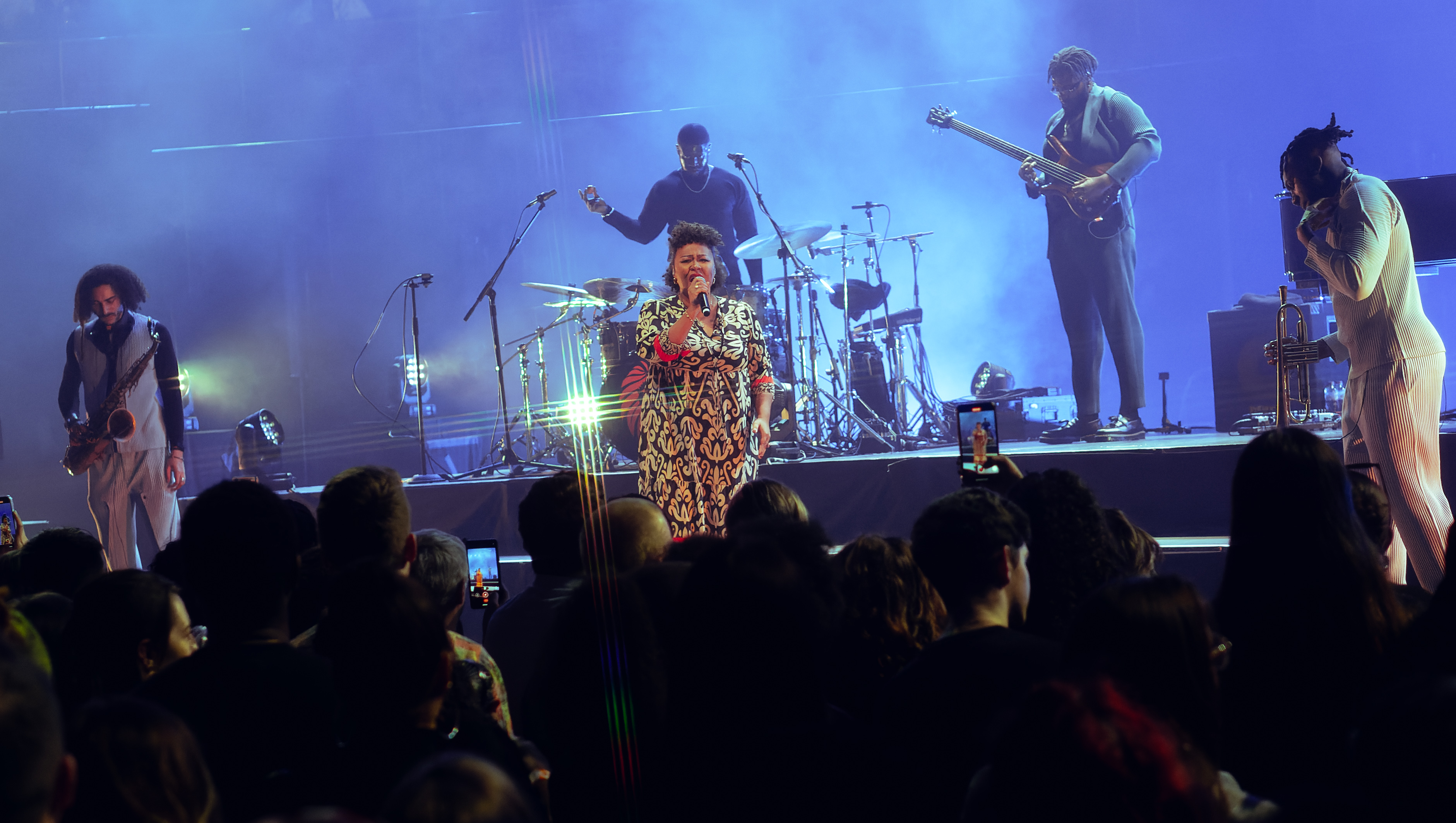
The Ezra Collective spent four weeks at number one in 2022 with their second studio album, Where I'm Meant to Be.

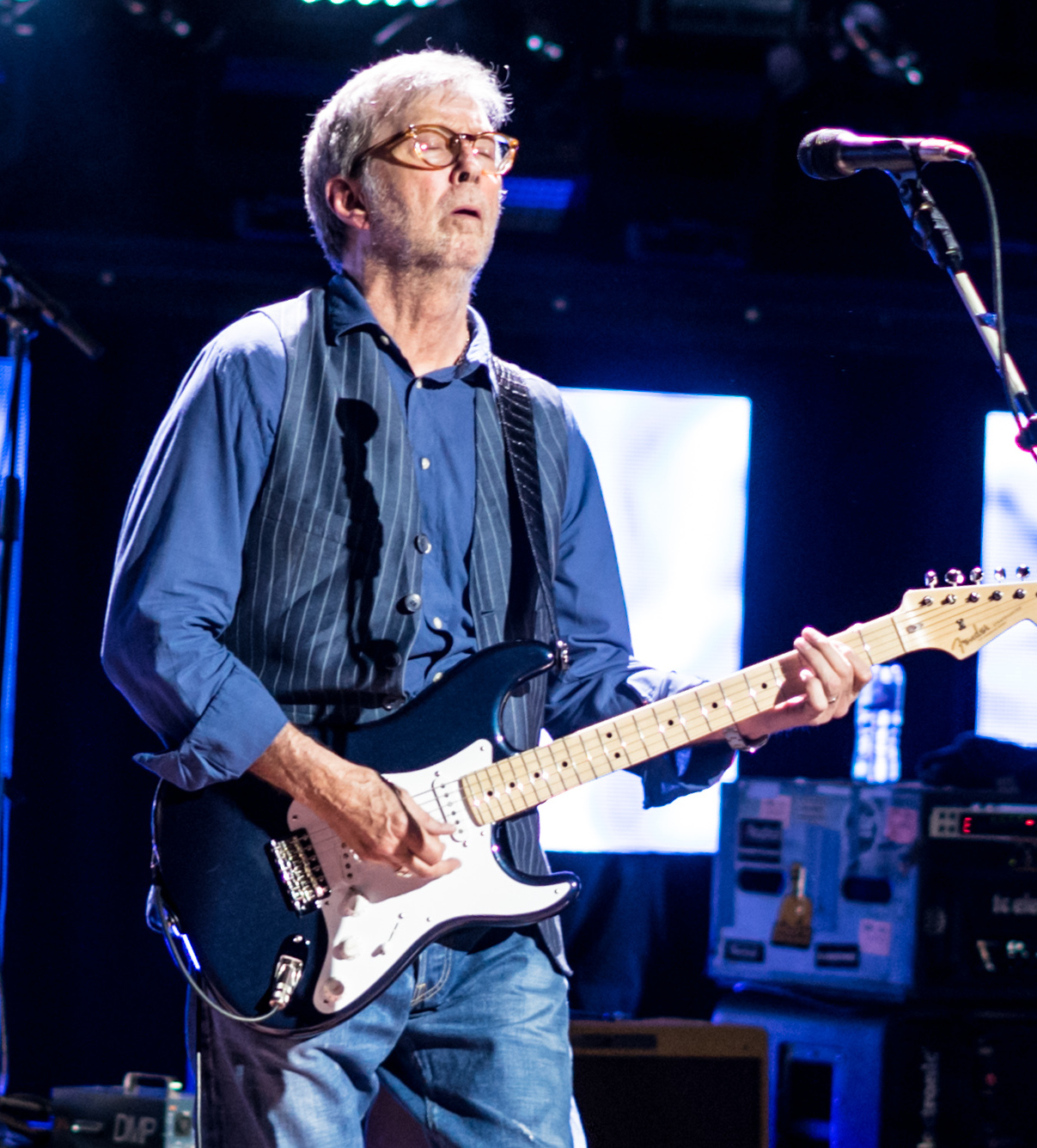
Eric Clapton's soundtrack to the film Nothing but the Blues spent three weeks atop the UK Jazz & Blues Albums Chart.

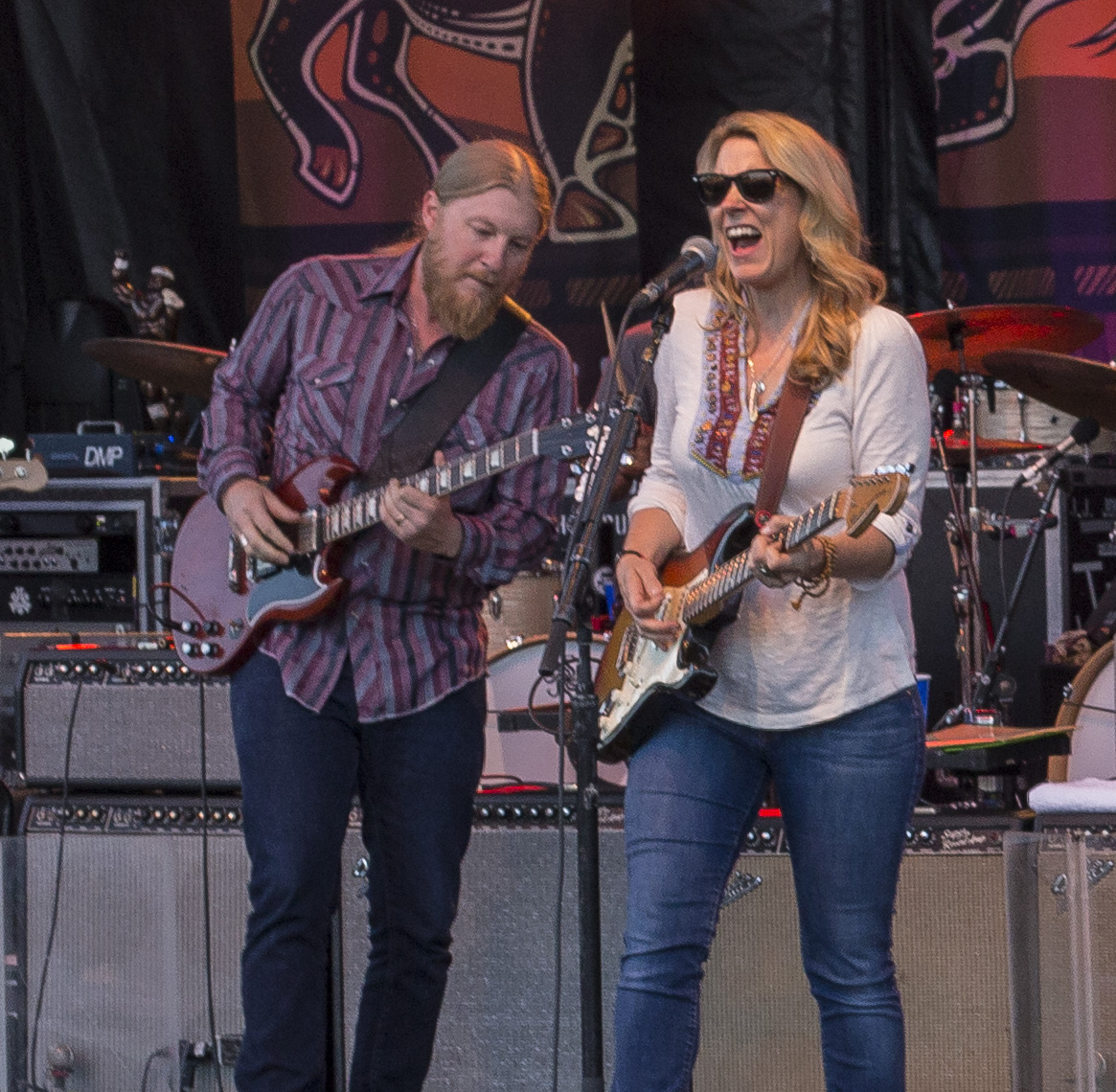
The Tedeschi Trucks Band also spent three weeks at number one in 2022, with parts two, three and four of I Am the Moon.

Issue date	Album	Artist(s)	Record label(s)	Ref.
7 January	Still Rising: The Collection	Gregory Porter	Decca	
14 January	Still Rising: The Collection	Gregory Porter	Decca	
21 January	Still Rising: The Collection	Gregory Porter	Decca	
28 January	Still Rising: The Collection	Gregory Porter	Decca	
4 February	Black Acid Soul	Lady Blackbird	BMG	
11 February	Black Acid Soul	Lady Blackbird	BMG	
18 February	Feeling Good: Her Greatest Hits	Nina Simone	Verve	
25 February	The Montreux Years	Nina Simone	BMG	
4 March	Shining in the Half Light	Elles Bailey	Outlaw	
11 March	The Montreux Years	John McLaughlin	BMG	
18 March	Superhuman	Ferris & Sylvester	Archtop	
25 March	Duke Ellington & John Coltrane	Duke Ellington, John Coltrane	Verve	
1 April	Still Rising: The Collection	Gregory Porter	Decca	
8 April	We Are	Jon Batiste	Verve	
15 April	Forest Floor	Fergus McCreadie	Edition	
22 April	Brother Johnny	Edgar Winter	Quarto Valley	
29 April	Get on Board	Taj Mahal, Ry Cooder	Nonesuch	
6 May	Come Away with Me	Norah Jones	Parlophone	
13 May	Get on Board	Taj Mahal, Ry Cooder	Nonesuch	
20 May	Black Acid Soul	Lady Blackbird	BMG	
27 May	Entre eux deux	Melody Gardot	UCJ	
3 June	The Fighter	Simon McBride	Ear	
10 June	Breaking Point!	Freddie Hubbard	Blue Note	
17 June	Blues from the Heart Live	Joanne Shaw Taylor	KTBA	
24 June	What It Is: Montreal 7/7/83	Miles Davis	Sony	
1 July	Nothing but the Blues	Eric Clapton	WEA	
8 July	I Am the Moon II: Ascension	Tedeschi Trucks Band	Fantasy	
15 July	Nothing but the Blues	Eric Clapton	WEA	
22 July	Nothing but the Blues	Eric Clapton	WEA	
29 July	The Very Best of Glenn Miller	Glenn Miller	Sony	
5 August	I Am the Moon III: The Fall	Tedeschi Trucks Band	Fantasy	
12 August	Could We Be More	Kokoroko	Brownswood	
19 August	Superhuman	Ferris & Sylvester	Archtop	
26 August	Ride	Walter Trout	Provogue	
2 September	I Am the Moon IV: Farewell	Tedeschi Trucks Band	Fantasy	
9 September	Live at the Checkerboard Lounge, Chicago 1981	Muddy Waters, The Rolling Stones	Eagle	
16 September	Cloud 10	Chip Wickham	Gondwana	
23 September	Blue Train	John Coltrane	Blue Note	
30 September	Only on Vinyl	Seasick Steve	There's a Dead Skunk	
7 October	Blue Note Re:Imagined II	various artists	Blue Note	
14 October	Blue Note Re:Imagined II	various artists	Blue Note	
21 October	Here It Is: A Tribute to Leonard Cohen	various artists	Blue Note	
28 October	Here It Is: A Tribute to Leonard Cohen	various artists	Blue Note	
4 November	Black Acid Soul	Lady Blackbird	BMG	
11 November	Where I'm Meant to Be	Ezra Collective	Partisan	
18 November	Nobody's Fool	Joanne Shaw Taylor	KTBA	
25 November	Where I'm Meant to Be	Ezra Collective	Partisan	
2 December	Black Acid Soul	Lady Blackbird	BMG	
9 December	A Charlie Brown Christmas	Vince Guaraldi	Craft	
16 December	A Charlie Brown Christmas	Vince Guaraldi	Craft	
23 December	Where I'm Meant to Be	Ezra Collective	Partisan	
30 December	Where I'm Meant to Be	Ezra Collective	Partisan	

== See also ==
- 2022 in British music
