= Kofi Burbridge =

American musician (1961–2019)

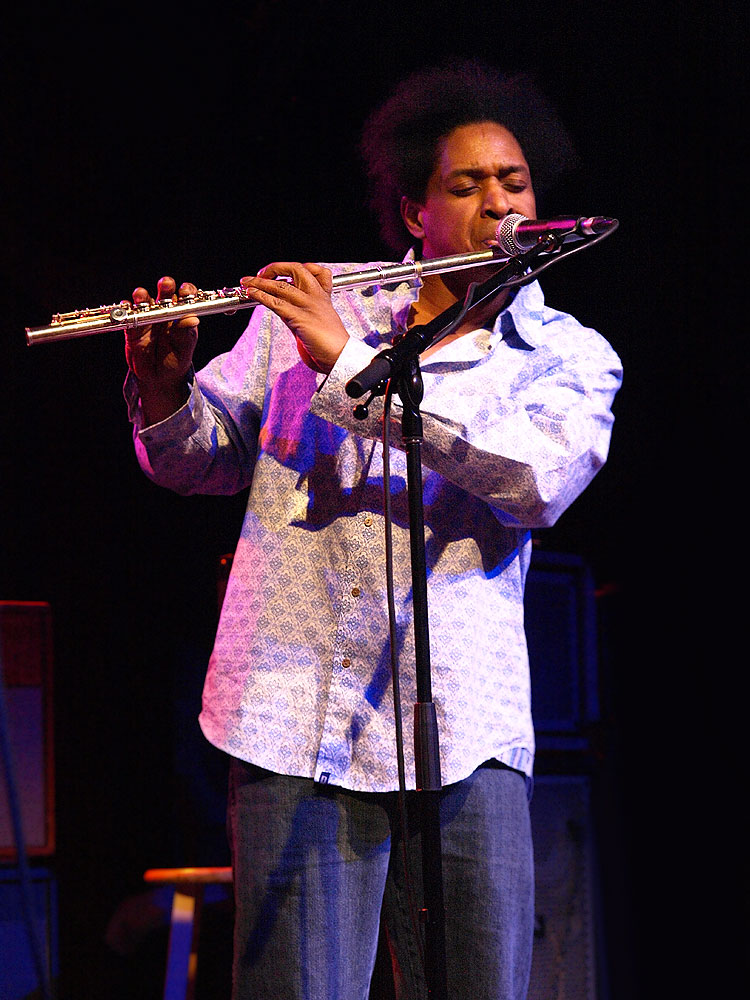
- Burbridge with Soulive in 2010

Background information
- Born: September 22, 1961; Bronx, New York, United States
- Died: February 15, 2019 (aged 57) Atlanta, Georgia, United States
- Genres: Blues, blues rock, soul, world music, R&B, jazz fusion
- Occupation: Musician
- Instruments: Keyboards, organ, flute, backing vocals
- Labels: Columbia, Alligator, Landslide Records
- Website: www.tedeschitrucksband.com

Kofi Burbridge (September 22, 1961 – February 15, 2019) was an American keyboardist and flautist of the blues and blues rock group Tedeschi Trucks Band.

Burbridge was a classically trained multi-instrumentalist who provided keyboards, organ, flute, and backing vocals for various bands throughout his career. He was previously part of the Grammy Award-winning Derek Trucks Band. He was also the brother of bass player Oteil Burbridge, who is known for his work in the Allman Brothers Band, Aquarium Rescue Unit, Dead & Company, and the Tedeschi Trucks Band. Oteil Burbridge cites his brother as his biggest influence and mentioned Kofi was found to have perfect pitch around the age of seven.

== Early life ==
Burbridge was born to William and Carol Burbridge in the Bronx, New York, United States, although the family moved to Washington, D.C. two years later.

== Musical career ==
Burbridge joined his first band in the Atlanta region called Knee-Deep, and the lineup included his brother Oteil and Jeff Sipe on drums. The band broke up after less than a year but introduced him to other notable musicians in the area like Bruce Hampton. He eventually joined the Aquarium Rescue Unit shortly after Col Bruce Hampton left, which reunited him with his brother and with Sipe.

=== The Derek Trucks Band ===
Burbridge joined the Derek Trucks Band in 1999. Both Trucks and Burbridge's brother Oteil were members of the Allman Brothers Band and Kofi occasionally guested with that band. In 2010, Derek Trucks announced a hiatus for his solo band and formed a new group with his wife, Susan Tedeschi, called the Tedeschi Trucks Band and both Burbridge brothers became members.

=== The Tedeschi Trucks Band ===
In 2010, Kofi joined his brother Oteil Burbridge in the new group, Tedeschi Trucks Band, which merged some former members of The Derek Trucks Band and Susan Tedeschi's former backing band. The band performed at Eric Clapton's Crossroads Guitar Festival 2010 and appears on the DVD release with two of their songs, "Midnight in Harlem" and "Comin' Home".

The Tedeschi Trucks Band released their debut album, Revelator in 2011, which won the Grammy Award for Best Blues Album at the 54th Grammy Awards. In 2012, the band released Everybody's Talkin', a double live album compiled from their 2011 world tour. In August 2013, their second studio album, Made Up Mind, was released. Their third studio album, Let Me Get By, appeared in 2016. In 2017, the band released a second live album, Live from the Fox Oakland. They released their fourth album, Signs, in 2019.

== Death ==
On June 20, 2017, Kofi Burbridge suffered a heart attack, and had surgery to repair an aortic rupture. After four months of recovery, Burbridge returned to the band in October 2017, but suffered a health setback that was announced on January 4, 2019, by the band. Burbridge died at the age of 57 on February 15, 2019, the day that Tedeschi Trucks Band's fourth album, Signs, was released.

== Discography ==
=== With The Aquarium Rescue Unit ===
- In a Perfect World (1994)
- The Calling (2003)

=== With Naked Jazz ===
- Naked Jazz Takes Off (1997)

=== With The Derek Trucks Band ===
- Joyful Noise (2002)
- Soul Serenade (2003)
- Live at Georgia Theatre (2004)
- Songlines (2006)
- Songlines Live (2006, DVD)
- Already Free (2009)
- Roadsongs (2010)

=== With The Tedeschi Trucks Band ===
- Revelator (2011)
- Everybody's Talkin' (2012)
- Made Up Mind (2013)
- Let Me Get By (2016)
- Live from the Fox Oakland (2017)
- Signs (2019)

=== Other ===
- Surrender to the Air - Surrender to the Air, an instrumental collective organized by Trey Anastasio of Phish (1996)
- Love of a Lifetime - Oteil and the Peacemakers (1998)
- Croakin' at Toad's - Frogwings (2000)
- Live Rebel Funk Love - Entropy (2002)
- Go There - Scott Sawyer (2007)
- Lifeboat - Jimmy Herring (2008)
- Deep Elem Blues - The Acoustic Company (2017)
