= Future Soul (album) =

Studio album by Tedeschi Trucks Band
- Released: March 20, 2026
- Studios: Swamp Raga Recording (Jacksonville, Florida); Phantom Studios (Gallatin, Tennessee)
- Length: 42:18
- Labels: Swamp Family; Fantasy; Concord
- Producer: Mike Elizondo

Tedeschi Trucks Band chronology
I Am the Moon (2022)	Future Soul (2026)

Future Soul is the sixth studio album by the American blues rock group the Tedeschi Trucks Band. It was released on March 20, 2026, by Swamp Family Music and Fantasy Records, with distribution by Concord Music Group. The album was produced by Mike Elizondo with group member Derek Trucks co-producing.

Future Soul was nominated for a Grammy Award for Best Americana Album.

== Background ==
Future Soul was recorded at the group's own Swamp Raga Recording studio in Jacksonville, Florida as well as Elizondo's own Phantom Studios in Gallatin, Tennessee.

== Promotion ==
The album's lead single, "I Got You", was released in tandem with the announcement of the album on January 23, 2026. The second single, "Who Am I", was released on February 20, 2026.

The Tedeschi Trucks Band will embark on a tour in support of this album, set to run from April to October 2026.

== Critical reception ==
Writing for No Depression, John Amen described Future Soul as "ambitious in scope and easy-going in tone". Americana Highways wrote in their review of the album that it "stands as a testament not just to musical excellence but to what’s possible when two people build something together over decades. This is what power couples do when they’re working: they lift each other up, celebrate each other’s gifts, and invite the rest of us into what they’ve made".

== Track listing ==
Future Soul track listing
No.	Title	Writer(s)	Length
1.	"Crazy Cryin'"	Mike Mattison; Derek Trucks	3:31
2.	"I Got You"	Mattison	4:20
3.	"Who Am I"	Gabe Dixon; Mattison; Susan Tedeschi; Trucks	4:56
4.	"Hero"	Tyler Greenwell; Tedeschi; Trucks	4:12
5.	"What in the World"	Paul Olsen	2:59
6.	"Future Soul"	Mattison	3:19
7.	"Under the Knife"	Mattison; Tedeschi; Trucks	3:32
8.	"Be Kind"	Dixon	3:22
9.	"Devil Be Gone"	Dixon	4:35
10.	"Shout Out"	Greenwell; Mattison; Tedeschi; Trucks	4:16
11.	"Ride On"	Dixon; Trucks	3:16
Total length:			42:18

== Personnel ==
Credits adapted from Tidal.

=== Tedeschi Trucks Band ===
- Brandon Boone – bass guitar (tracks 1, 2, 5–7, 9–11)
- Alecia Chakour – background vocals (1, 2, 4, 6–11), tambourine (1, 3, 6, 8)
- Gabe Dixon – Hammond B3 (1–5, 7, 9–11), piano (2, 8), keyboards (3, 6–11), background vocals (7, 9)
- Isaac Eady – drums (1, 2, 5–7, 9–11), percussion (2)
- Emmanuel Echem – trumpet (1, 2, 5, 7–11)
- Tyler Greenwell – drums (1–3, 6, 8, 11), percussion (6), shaker (7)
- Elizabeth Lea – trombone (1, 2, 5, 7–11)
- Mike Mattison – background vocals (1, 2, 4, 6–11), acoustic guitar (2, 7, 10), vocals (7)
- Mark Rivers – background vocals (1, 2, 4, 6–11), shaker (3)
- Susan Tedeschi – vocals (1–6, 8–11), electric guitar (1, 4, 6, 8–10), background vocals (7)
- Derek Trucks – electric guitar; acoustic guitar (3, 5), electronic percussion (7)
- Kebbi Williams – saxophone (2, 5, 7–11)

=== Additional musicians ===
- Mike Elizondo – keyboards (3, 4, 6, 7, 10, 11), bass guitar (3, 4, 8), acoustic guitar (3)
- Abe Rounds – percussion (1, 7, 10, 11)
- Austin Hoke – cello (10)

=== Technical personnel ===
- Mike Elizondo – production
- Derek Trucks – co-production
- Justin Francis – engineering, mixing
- Bobby Tis – engineering
- Alex Wilder – engineering assistance
- Erica Block – engineering assistance
- Chris Gehringer – mastering

== Charts ==
Chart performance for Future Soul
Chart (2026)	Peak position
Austrian Albums (Ö3 Austria)	33
Belgian Albums (Ultratop Flanders)	75
Belgian Albums (Ultratop Wallonia)	136
Croatian International Albums (HDU)	22
French Physical Albums (SNEP)	42
French Rock & Metal Albums (SNEP)	8
German Albums (Offizielle Top 100)	19
German Rock & Metal Albums (Offizielle Top 100)	8
Japanese Rock Albums (Oricon)	12
Japanese Western Albums (Oricon)	7
Scottish Albums (Official Charts)	7
Swedish Physical Albums (Sverigetopplistan)	12
UK Albums Sales (OCC)	7
UK Americana Albums (Official Charts)	4
US Billboard 200	166
US Americana/Folk Albums (Billboard)	12
US Independent Albums (Billboard)	28
US Top Blues Albums (Billboard)	1
US Top Rock & Alternative Albums (Billboard)	43
