= Everybody's Talkin' (Tedeschi Trucks Band album) =

Live album by Tedeschi Trucks Band
- Released: May 22, 2012
- Recorded: October 2011 (See details below)
- Genres: Rock, blues rock, blues
- Length: 103:04
- Label: Sony Masterworks
- Producer: Derek Trucks

Tedeschi Trucks Band chronology
| Revelator (2011) | Everybody's Talkin' (2012) | Made Up Mind (2013) |

Everybody's Talkin' is the second album and the first live album by the 11-piece Tedeschi Trucks Band and was released in 2012 by Sony Masterworks. It's been released as a 2-CD and 3-CD set as well as a three disc vinyl set. The title comes from the song carrying the same name, formerly a hit for Harry Nilsson. The band's cover is a hybrid of the Nilsson and Bill Withers versions.

The songs on the album are a compilation of recordings from the following three nights

- October 25, 2011 at The Danforth Music Hall, Toronto, ON by Embrace Presents
- October 28, 2011 at the Warner Theatre, Washington, D.C.
- October 29, 2011 at Fairfield Theatre Compagny at The Klein, Bridgeport, CT

In an interview with Rolling Stone magazine, Trucks stated many of the tracks came from the almost-cancelled Bridgeport, CT show. "There was a real loose feeling to it, which ended up being great. We used a lot of stuff from that night."

== Reception ==
Professional ratings
Review scores
| Source | Rating |
|---|---|
| All About Jazz | 3.5/4 stars |
| AllMusic | 3.5/5 stars |
| PopMatters | 7/10 stars |
| Rolling Stone | 3.5/5 stars |

Writing for AllMusic, critic Thom Jurek wrote "It's an unusual live record because its balance of sonic precision and stage-born kinetics is perfect—this band transitions seamlessly between R&B, blues, rock, gospel, and jazz. These performances never succumb to mere jam band clichés... Everybody's Talkin' is what every live album should be: an accurate, exciting reflection of a hot band playing full-throttle." He especially praised Tedeschi as "among the truly great singers in modern blues and rock; by turns graceful and grainy, her expression reaches the spiritual in execution." Will Layman of PopMatters praised the performances and called it "the kind of music that shamelessly moves at you with emotion and soul". Doug Collette of All About Jazz generally praised the album, especially the sound, but was critical of the length of the songs, commenting on the "shortage of instrumental fireworks".

The review aggregator site, Metacritic calculated an average score of 75 based on 6 reviews.

== Track listing ==
=== Disc 1 ===
| No. | Title | Writer(s) | Length |
|---|---|---|---|
| 1. | "Everybody's Talkin'" | Fred Neil | 5:31 |
| 2. | "Midnight In Harlem (Swamp Raga intro with Little Martha)" | Duane Allman / Mike Mattison, Derek Trucks | 10:23 |
| 3. | "Learn How to Love" | Adam Deitch, Eric Krasno, Adam Smirnoff, Susan Tedeschi, Trucks | 9:27 |
| 4. | "Bound for Glory" | Mattison, Tedeschi, Trucks | 12:53 |
| 5. | "Rollin' and Tumblin'" | Muddy Waters | 4:41 |
| 6. | "Nobody's Free" | Oteil Burbridge, Tyler Greenwell, Mattison, Tedeschi, Trucks | 10:24 |
| 7. | "Darling Be Home Soon" | John Sebastian | 10:04 |
| Total length: | | | 60:04 |

=== Disc 2 ===
| No. | Title | Writer(s) | Length |
|---|---|---|---|
| 1. | "That Did It" | P. Woods | 7:58 |
| 2. | "Uptight" | Henry Cosby, Sylvia Moy, Stevie Wonder | 15:32 |
| 3. | "Love Has Something Else To Say (with Kissing My Love)" | D. Bramhall, O. Burbridge, Mattison, Trucks / Bill Withers | 11:03 |
| 4. | "Wade in the Water" | James W. Alexander, Sam Cooke | 8:24 |
| Total length: | | | 43:00 |

== Personnel ==
- Derek Trucks – lead guitar
- Susan Tedeschi – lead vocals, rhythm guitar
- Oteil Burbridge – bass guitar
- Kofi Burbridge – keyboards, flute
- Tyler Greenwell – drums, percussion
- J. J. Johnson – drums, percussion
- Mike Mattison – harmony vocals
- Mark Rivers – harmony vocals
- Kebbi Williams – saxophone
- Maurice "Mobetta" Brown – trumpet
- Saunders Sermons – trombone

== Credits ==
- Producers - Derek Trucks
- Engineers - Bobby Tis
- Additional Engineer - Marty Wall
- Mixing - Jim Scott
- Mastering - Bob Ludwig

== Chart positions ==
| Chart (2012) | Peak position |
|---|---|
| Australian ARIA Charts | 49 |
| German Albums (Offizielle Top 100) | 87 |
| UK Jazz & Blues Albums (Official Charts) | 3 |
