= I Don't Want Nobody =

I Don't Want Nobody may refer to:

- "I Don't Want Nobody", a 1980 song by Ike Turner from his album The Edge
- "I Don't Want Nobody", a 1995 song by Susan Tedeschi from her album Better Days
- "I Don't Want Nobody", a song by Fernest Arceneaux
