= Just Won't Burn =

Studio album by Susan Tedeschi
- Released: 10 February 1998
- Recorded: 1997
- Genre: Blues
- Length: 45:57
- Label: Tone Cool
- Producer: Susan Tedeschi, Tom Hambridge

Susan Tedeschi chronology
Better Days (1995)	Just Won't Burn (1998)	Wait for Me (2002)

Just Won't Burn is the second studio album by American blues artist Susan Tedeschi, recorded in 1997. The album had national success upon release in 1998. An expanded 25th Anniversary edition of the album was released in 2023.

== Reception ==
Professional ratings
Review scores
Source	Rating
AllMusic	4/5 stars
The Penguin Guide to Blues Recordings	3.5/4 stars
The Encyclopedia of Popular Music	4/5 stars

The album earned Tedeschi a nomination for "Best New Artist" at the 42nd Annual Grammy Awards.

Billboard's Chris Morris called the album "a striking showcase for her gravel-voiced shouting and fiery axework," and noted that she is being "pegged... as a rising successor to Bonnie Raitt."

Jana Pendragon of AllMusic stated that Tedeschi "slings, aims, and hits her target," and commented: "What a talent! Singer, songwriter, player, performer, and more, the lady from Boston can do it all... A brave heart with spunk and plenty of soul."

The authors of The Penguin Guide to Blues Recordings wrote that, in relation to her previous release, Just Won't Burn features songwriting that is "both more stylish... and... markedly more personal."

Writing for JazzTimes, Bill Milkowski remarked: "She sings and plays with a lot of heart and also demonstrates a talent for songwriting on this strong debut. Yeah, she's real."

Ed Kopp of All About Jazz described the album as "a perfect vehicle for Tedeschi's powerful singing," which, he noted, is "emotionally charged and very engaging."

The Music Box's John Metzger called the album "a truly amazing effort that is full of promise for the future, even as it looks to the past," and wrote: "Tedeschi is the real deal, and... the comparisons to Joplin and Raitt truly are warranted. She approaches songs with the same level of passion, hiding her pain beneath the strength of her voice."

== Track listing ==
1. "Rock Me Right" (Tom Hambridge) – 4:27
2. "You Need to Be With Me" (Tedeschi) – 3:04
3. "Little by Little" (Junior Wells) – 3:49
4. "It Hurt So Bad" (Tom Hambridge) – 4:50
5. "Found Someone New" (Tedeschi) – 2:20
6. "Looking for Answers" (Tedeschi) – 5:13
7. "Can't Leave You Alone" (Adrienne Hayes) – 3:02
8. "Just Won't Burn" (Tedeschi) – 4:46
9. "Mama, He Treats Your Daughter Mean" (Herb Lance, Charlie Singleton, John Wallace) – 4:43
10. "Angel from Montgomery" (John Prine) – 5:23
11. "Friar's Point" (Tom Hambridge, Tedeschi) – 4:21

== Personnel ==
- Susan Tedeschi - electric, acoustic and slide guitar, piano, vocals
- Sean Costello - lead guitar
- Adrienne Hayes - electric guitar, rhythm guitar
- Tom West - piano, Hammond organ
- Ian Kennedy - fiddle
- Annie Raines - harmonica
- Norm DeMoura, Jim Lamond - bass
- Mike Levesque - drums
- Tom Hambridge - percussion, drums, tambourine, timbales, background vocals
- Tino Barker - baritone saxophone
- Gordon Beadle - tenor saxophone
- Bird Taylor - background vocals
- Buck Taylor - background vocals

== Production ==
- Producers: Susan Tedeschi, Tom Hambridge
- Executive producer: Richard Rosenblatt
- Associate producers: Susan Tedeschi, Ducky Carlisle
- Engineers: Brian Capouch, Sean Carberry, Ducky Carlisle, Chris Rival
- Mixing: Brian Capouch, Sean Carberry, Ducky Carlisle
- Mastering: Dr. Toby Mountain
- Assistant: Ducky Carlisle
- Art direction: Diane Menyuk
- Photography: Ron Pownall
- Liner notes: Bob Vorel

== Charts ==
Album - Billboard (United States)

Year	Chart	Position
1998	Heatseekers	9
1998	Top Blues Albums	2
1999	The Billboard 200	181

Singles - Billboard (United States)

Year	Single	Chart	Position
1999	"Rock Me Right"	Mainstream Rock Tracks	37
