= Dennis Montgomery =

Dennis Montgomery may refer to:

- Dennis Montgomery III (born 1965), African-American pianist, organist, and professor
- Dennis L. Montgomery (born 1953), American software designer
