= Let Me Get By =

Studio album by Tedeschi Trucks Band
- Released: January 29, 2016
- Recorded: Early 2015
- Studios: Swamp Raga Studios (Jacksonville, Florida)
- Genres: Blues, rock, R&B
- Length: 56:28
- Label: Fantasy
- Producer: Derek Trucks

Tedeschi Trucks Band chronology
Made Up Mind (2013)	Let Me Get By (2016)	Live from the Fox Oakland (2017)

Alternative cover
- Deluxe Edition

Let Me Get By is the third studio album from blues-rock group Tedeschi Trucks Band, released in 2016.

== Background ==
During breaks in touring in early 2015, the band used Trucks and Tedeschi's home studio in Jacksonville, FL to record the album. Unlike their previous album, Let Me Get By was written fully by the band, with help from Doyle Bramhall II. Trucks produced the album himself, after having co-produced the band's previous albums.

== Reception ==
Professional ratings
Review scores
Source	Rating
AllMusic	4.5/5 stars
PopMatters	8/10 stars
Rolling Stone	3/5 stars

Thom Jurek of AllMusic wrote "An obvious studio offering, it's warm and resonant, yet crackling with energy and ideas. The feel is loose and grooving, the performances hot... Never has TTB sounded so organic, relaxed, and free. Let Me Get By is the album this group has been striving for since their formation. You need this."

Will Hermes of Rolling Stone wrote "Tedeschi has chops, charm, and a workmanlike style that could at times use some pizzazz. But sharing duties with polyvalent vocalist Mike Mattison... and the other soloists, she steers a band greater than its parts, and still growing better."

PopMatters wrote of the album "Past Tedeschi Trucks Band records had their charms and their high points but this is the record that gets everything right from the first note to the last and it’s a welcome progression from a band that deserves all the good things coming its way in the wake of this record."

== Track listing ==
No.	Title	Writer(s)	Length
1.	"Anyhow"	Mike Mattison, Derek Trucks, Susan Tedeschi	6:34
2.	"Laugh About It"	Mattison, Trucks, Tedeschi, Kofi Burbridge, Tim Lefebvre	5:06
3.	"Don't Know What It Means"	Mattison, Tedeschi, Trucks, Burbridge, J.J. Johnson, Lefebvre	5:58
4.	"Right on Time"	Mattison, Trucks	4:33
5.	"Let Me Get By"	Burbridge, Tyler Greenwell, Lefebvre, Mattison, Tedeschi, Trucks	4:25
6.	"Just as Strange"	Doyle Bramhall II, Tedeschi, Trucks	3:41
7.	"Crying Over You / Swamp Raga for Holzapfel, Lefebvre, Flute and Harmonium"	Mattison, Tedeschi, Trucks / Trucks	8:03
8.	"Hear Me"	Trucks, Bramhall	4:32
9.	"I Want More"	Trucks, Tedeschi, Bramhall	7:15
10.	"In Every Heart"	Trucks, Tedeschi, Mattison	6:21
Total length:			56:28

The deluxe CD release of Let Me Get By includes a bonus CD which includes:

1. "Hear Me [Alternate Mix]" - 4:34
2. "In Every Heart [Alternate Mix]" - 6:35
3. "Oh! You Pretty Things" - 3:02
4. "Just As Strange [Alternate Mix]" - 2:35
5. "Satie Groove" - 4:04
6. "Laugh About It [Live Recording - The Beacon Theatre, New York City, NY]" - 5:32
7. "I Pity The Fool [Live Recording - The Beacon Theatre, New York City, NY]" - 6:51
8. "Keep On Growing [Live Recording - The Beacon Theatre, New York City, NY]" - 9:38

== Personnel ==
- Susan Tedeschi – lead vocals, rhythm guitar
- Derek Trucks – lead guitar
- Kofi Burbridge – keyboards, flute
- Tyler Greenwell – drums, percussion
- J. J. Johnson – drums, percussion
- Mike Mattison – background vocals
- Mark Rivers – background vocals
- Alecia Chakour – background vocals
- Kebbi Williams – saxophone
- Tim Lefebvre – bass
- Maurice "Mobetta" Brown – trumpet
- Saunders Sermons – trombone
- Ephraim Owens – trumpet (deluxe edition live tracks only)
- Elizabeth Lea – trombone (deluxe edition live tracks only)

== Charts ==
=== Weekly charts ===
Chart (2016)	Peak position
Australian Albums (ARIA)	36
Austrian Albums (Ö3 Austria)	45
Belgian Albums (Ultratop Flanders)	151
Belgian Albums (Ultratop Wallonia)	174
Canadian Albums (Billboard)	67
Dutch Albums (Album Top 100)	37
French Albums (SNEP)	168
German Albums (Offizielle Top 100)	17
Italian Albums (FIMI)	77
Swiss Albums (Schweizer Hitparade)	98
UK Albums (OCC)	152
US Billboard 200	15
US Top Blues Albums (Billboard)	1
US Top Rock Albums (Billboard)	2

=== Year-end charts ===
Chart (2016)	Position
US Top Blues Albums (Billboard)	4
US Top Rock Albums (Billboard)	61
