= Made Up Mind =

Studio album by Tedeschi Trucks Band
- Released: August 20, 2013
- Studios: Swamp Raga Studios (Jacksonville, Florida)
- Genres: Rock; R&B; soul
- Length: 53:14
- Label: Sony Masterworks
- Producers: Jim Scott; Derek Trucks

Tedeschi Trucks Band chronology
| Everybody's Talkin' (2012) | Made Up Mind (2013) | Let Me Get By (2016) |

Professional ratings
Aggregate scores
| Source | Rating |
|---|---|
| Metacritic | 76/100 |
Review scores
| Source | Rating |
| American Songwriter | 4/5 stars |
| AllMusic | 4/5 stars |
| PopMatters | 8/10 stars |
| Rolling Stone | 3.5/5 stars |

Made Up Mind is the second studio album from blues-rock group Tedeschi Trucks Band. It was released August 20, 2013 by Masterworks Records.

In 2014, it won a Blues Music Award in the 'Rock Blues Album of the Year' category.

== Reception ==
Thom Jurek of AllMusic wrote " Made Up Mind is tight; it maintains the gritty, steamy, Southern heart displayed on Revelator, but the growth in songwriting, arrangement, and production is immeasurable. Everything these players have assimilated throughout their individual careers is filtered through a group consciousness. When it expresses itself musically, historical and cultural lineages are questioned and answered incessantly in the tension of their dialogue, creating a sound that is not only instantly recognizable, but offers a nearly limitless set of sonic possibilities." Julian Ring of Rolling Stone called the album "equal parts Stax and Muscle Shoals without the dilution of either." PopMatters called the album "a brilliant throwback without ever truly sounding anachronistic."

The album debuted at No. 11 on Billboard chart in its first week, and it also debuted at No. 9 on the album sales chart, as well as No. 2 on Billboard’s Rock chart and No. 1 on the Blues chart. The album has sold 113,000 copies in the United States as of December 2015.

== Track listing ==
| No. | Title | Writer(s) | Length |
|---|---|---|---|
| 1. | "Made Up Mind" | Oliver Wood, Derek Trucks, Susan Tedeschi | 3:55 |
| 2. | "Do I Look Worried" | John Leventhal, Trucks, Tedeschi | 4:35 |
| 3. | "Idle Wind" | Gary Michael Louris, Trucks, Tedeschi | 5:11 |
| 4. | "Misunderstood" | Sonya Kitchell; Eric Krasno | 5:42 |
| 5. | "Part of Me" | Doyle Bramhall, II, Trucks, Tedeschi, Mike Mattison | 4:08 |
| 6. | "Whiskey Legs" | Trucks, Louris, Tedeschi | 4:06 |
| 7. | "It's So Heavy" | Kitchell, Krasno, Trucks | 4:59 |
| 8. | "All That I Need" | Trucks, Bramhall, Tedeschi | 5:13 |
| 9. | "Sweet and Low" | Krasno, David Gutter, Trucks, Tedeschi, Adam Smirnoff | 5:04 |
| 10. | "The Storm" | Trucks, Tedeschi, Leventhal | 6:35 |
| 11. | "Calling Out to You" | Krasno, Gutter | 3:46 |
| Total length: | | | 53:14 |

== Personnel ==
- Derek Trucks – lead guitar
- Susan Tedeschi – lead vocals, rhythm guitar
- Bakithi Kumalo – bass guitar, conga, percussion
- Dave Monsey – bass guitar
- Pino Palladino – bass guitar
- George Reiff – bass guitar
- Kofi Burbridge – clavinet, Flute, Hammond B3, piano, Wurlitzer
- Tyler Greenwell – drums, percussion
- J. J. Johnson – drums, percussion
- Mike Mattison – harmony vocals
- Mark Rivers – harmony vocals
- Kebbi Williams – saxophone
- Maurice "Mobetta" Brown – trumpet
- Saunders Sermons – trombone
- Doyle Bramhall II – guitar, background vocals
- John Leventhal – guitar

== Chart positions ==
| Chart (2013) | Peak position |
|---|---|
| Australian Albums (ARIA) | 48 |
| German Albums (Offizielle Top 100) | 30 |
| Dutch Albums (Album Top 100) | 79 |
| Norwegian Albums (VG-lista) | 23 |
| Scottish Albums (Official Charts) | 50 |
| Swedish Albums (Sverigetopplistan) | 47 |
| Swiss Albums (Schweizer Hitparade) | 22 |
| UK Albums (Official Charts) | 52 |
| UK Jazz & Blues Albums (Official Charts) | 2 |
| US Billboard 200 | 11 |
| US Top Blues Albums (Billboard) | 1 |
| US Top Rock Albums (Billboard) | 2 |
| US Indie Store Album Sales (Billboard) | 2 |
