= Maurice "Mobetta" Brown =

American jazz trumpeter, producer and composer

Maurice Brown
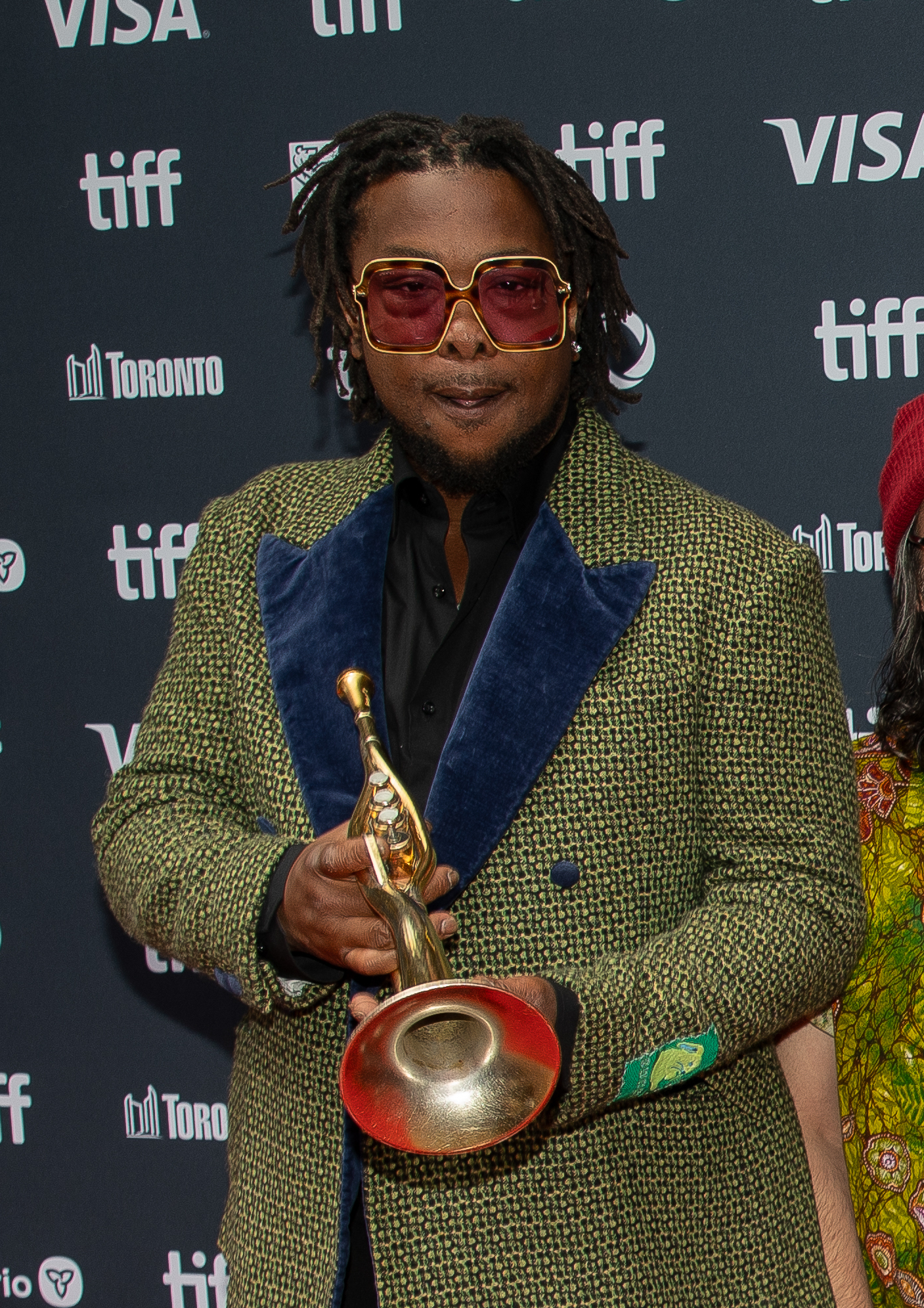

Background information
- Born: Maurice Brown; January 6, 1981 (age 45)
- Origin: Harvey, Illinois, US
- Genres: Jazz, Hip hop, Blues
- Occupation: Musician
- Instrument: Trumpet
- Website: mauricebrown.net

Maurice "Mobetta" Brown originally from Harvey, Illinois is a Grammy Award-winning American jazz trumpeter, producer and composer. As a member of Tedeschi Trucks Band, he shared the 2011 Grammy for Best Blues Album (Revelator).

== Biography ==
Brown was born in Harvey, Illinois and grew up in the south suburbs of Chicago. He met Wynton Marsalis in the 8th grade while performing at a seminar attended by Marsalis. While attending Hillcrest High School in Country Club Hills, Brown was chosen to participate in the National High School GRAMMY Band, which led Ramsey Lewis to begin hiring Brown to perform with his band.

Brown began college at Northern Illinois University, then transferred to Southern University in Baton Rouge, Louisiana, studying under jazz clarinetist Alvin Batiste. Later, he moved to New Orleans, where he led a regular Tuesday night residency at the Snug Harbor jazz club and released his first album, "Hip to Bop".

After Hurricane Katrina, Brown relocated back to Chicago, then to New York City. He currently splits time between his residence in the Bedford-Stuyvesant neighborhood of Brooklyn and Los Angeles. He always finds time to spend time with his family even though he is always busy .

== Collaborations ==
These include working with Ellis Marsalis, Jr., Johnny Griffin, Clark Terry, Lonnie Plaxico, Stefon Harris and recording with Fred Anderson (musician), Ernest Dawkins, Curtis Fuller, Roy Hargrove, George Freeman (guitarist), Anderson .Paak, Free Nationals, Bruno Mars, Harry Styles, Silk Sonic, CeeLo Green, Aretha Franklin, De La Soul, Musiq Soulchild, The Roots, Wyclef Jean and the Tedeschi Trucks Band. On Brown's latest CD release, "Maurice vs Mobetta", he features Jean Grae on the track "Back at the Ranch".

== Performances ==
These include becoming the weekly headliner at the New Orleans jazz club Snug Harbor (jazz club) in the two years just prior to the Katrina Hurricane tragedy. In 2010 he toured internationally with his band Maurice Brown and the Full Effect appearing in such locales as New Delhi, India and Jakarta, Indonesia as well as the Kennedy Center for the Performing Arts in Washington, D.C. Maurice has been a featured artist at the 2010, 2011, 2012 and 2015 Jakarta International Java Jazz Festival, one of the world's largest celebrations of jazz artistry.

== Selected recordings ==
Maurice's debut CD release made JazzWeek's list of commercial radio airplay with the album "Hip to Bop" spending a total of 36 weeks, reaching a position of #20 within 12 weeks of airplay on December 29, 2004.

- "Hip to Bop" (Brown Records 2004)
- "Cycle of Love" (Brown Records 2010)
- "Revelator (Tedeschi Trucks Band album)" (Sony Masterworks 2011)
- "Everybody's Talkin' (Tedeschi Trucks Band album)" (Sony Masterworks 2012)
- "Maurice vs Mobetta" (Brown Records 2013)
- "Made Up Mind" (Sony Masterworks 2013)
- "Let Me Get By" (Fantasy Records 2016)
- "The Mood" (Mobetta Music 2017)
- "Betta Days" (Mobetta Music/Empire 2025)
