= Signs (Tedeschi Trucks Band album) =

Studio album by Tedeschi Trucks Band
- Released: February 15, 2019
- Recorded: 2018
- Studio: Swamp Raga Studios (Jacksonville, Florida)
- Genre: Blues rock
- Length: 46:28
- Label: Fantasy Records
- Producer: Derek Trucks, Jim Scott, Bobby Tis

Tedeschi Trucks Band chronology
Live from the Fox Oakland (2017)	Signs (2019)	I Am the Moon (2022)

Signs is the fourth studio album by American blues rock group Tedeschi Trucks Band. The album was released on February 15, 2019, by Fantasy Records, on the same day that Kofi Burbridge, the band's keyboardist, died.

== Critical reception ==
Professional ratings
Aggregate scores
Source	Rating
Metacritic	79/100
Review scores
Source	Rating
AllMusic	4/5 stars
American Songwriter	3/5 stars
Slant Magazine	3.5/5 stars

Signs received generally positive reviews from critics. At Metacritic, which assigns a normalized rating out of 100 to reviews from critics, the album received an average score of 79, which indicates "generally favorable reviews", based on 6 reviews.

== Track listing ==
No.	Title	Writer(s)	Length
1.	"Signs, High Times"	Mike Mattison, Derek Trucks, Susan Tedeschi, Kofi Burbridge, Tim Lefebvre	3:51
2.	"I'm Gonna Be There"	Trucks, Tedeschi, Anthony Cole, Doyle Bramhall II	5:48
3.	"When Will I Begin"	Tedeschi	4:17
4.	"Walk Through This Life"	Warren Haynes, Lefebvre, Tedeschi, Trucks	4:46
5.	"Strengthen What Remains"	Mattison	2:36
6.	"Still Your Mind"	Burbridge, Trucks	4:57
7.	"Hard Case"	Mattison, Tedeschi, Trucks	3:22
8.	"Shame"	Mattison, Lefebvre, Tedeschi, Trucks	4:55
9.	"All The World"	Bramhall, Tedeschi, Trucks	3:21
10.	"They Don't Shine"	Mattison, Kristina Train	3:33
11.	"The Ending"	Tedeschi, Trucks, Oliver Wood	5:02
Total length:			46:28

Japan bonus track
No.	Title	Writer(s)	Length
12.	"High & Mighty"	Bramhall, Trucks	4:33
Total length:			51:07

== Personnel ==
- Tim Lefebvre - bass guitar; double bass (5), acoustic guitar (6), baritone guitar (7)
- J.J. Johnson - drums, percussion
- Tyler Greenwell - drums, percussion
- Kofi Burbridge - keyboards; flute (5)
- Susan Tedeschi - lead vocals; lead and rhythm guitars (3, 4, 7, 10)
- Derek Trucks - lead and rhythm guitars; drums (4)
- Kebbi Williams - saxophone
- Elizabeth Lea - trombone
- Ephraim Owens - trumpet
- Mark Rivers, Mike Mattison, Alecia Chakour- vocals

Additional musicians

- Marc Quinones - congas, percussion (1, 2, 8)
- Doyle Bramhall II - additional guitar and vocals (2, 5)
- Alexei Romanenko - cello (2, 3, 5, 9)
- Jorge Peña - viola (2, 3, 5, 9)
- Grabriela Peña-Kim, Jonathan Kuo - violin (2, 3, 5, 9)
- Warren Haynes - vocals (4)
- Oliver Wood- acoustic guitar (11)

== Charts ==
Chart (2019)	Peak position
Austrian Albums (Ö3 Austria)	63
Belgian Albums (Ultratop Flanders)	155
Belgian Albums (Ultratop Wallonia)	171
Dutch Albums (Album Top 100)	96
French Albums (SNEP)	182
German Albums (Offizielle Top 100)	20
Scottish Albums (OCC)	23
Swiss Albums (Schweizer Hitparade)	20
UK Americana Albums (OCC)	1
US Billboard 200	28
US Folk Albums (Billboard)	2
US Top Rock Albums (Billboard)	3
US Top Blues Albums (Billboard)	1
