= Jim Scott (producer) =

American record producer

Jim Scott is an American record producer and audio engineer, best known for his large body of work as an engineer, and his work as a producer with American rock bands Tedeschi Trucks Band and Wilco.

Scott has worked as engineer with a range of other rock music artists, including Dixie Chicks, Tom Petty, Sting, the Rolling Stones, Crowded House, Red Hot Chili Peppers, Lowen & Navarro, Jack's Mannequin, Ron Sexsmith, The Mastersons and many others. Scott won a Grammy Award for engineering Tom Petty's Wildflowers, mixing the Foo Fighters' One By One, doing engineering work on Santana's Supernatural, and getting three Grammys for his work on the Dixie Chicks' Taking The Long Way. He also mixed Matchbox Twenty's More Than You Think You Are which reached a no. 6 on the US Billboard 200 and had two Top 10 singles on the US Hot 100.

In 2013, he participated in the documentary Sound City, by Dave Grohl (Foo Fighters), along with many others such as Paul McCartney, Butch Vig, Neil Young and Tom Petty. The film was about the Los Angeles studio and its Neve recording console, as well as its many visitors over the years.

== Early years ==
Scott grew up in St. Louis, Missouri. He was a drummer and singer in a few high school bands, notably The London Globe, Soul and The Reactions and Cole and The Embers. He bought his first set of drums in 1964 from Mel Bay. After high school, Scott went to California and studied at USC. It was there while performing the part of Cousin Kevin in the rock opera Tommy that he met musicians who became the folk-rock band Voices. Voices played gigs all over campus, coffee houses, and later at the Starwood on the Sunset Strip. Scott served as their self-taught producer, engineer, mixer, and roadie. Voices secured a record deal with MGM Records and were on their way to stardom when their crooked manager absconded with their advance money. After graduation, the band broke up and Scott became a geologist. After five years as a geologist, Scott returned to the music business.

== Record Plant years ==
At the urging of one of his friends who was a temporary accountant at The Record Plant recording studios, Scott was hired at minimum wage to be a gofer. Gofering led to janitoring which led to setup and maintenance and then remote recordings. While on the remote recording crew, Scott traveled the country recording such acts as Bruce Springsteen, Prince, The Blues Brothers, The Nitty Gritty Dirt Band, Heart, Neil Diamond, and The US Festival. He did over 400 shows in two years. In 1981, he met his wife, Carol, and decided to get off the road and work in the studio. While assisting at The Record Plant he was mentored by Andy Johns and Lee DeCarlo, and worked on albums by Dolly Parton, Dionne Warwick, Queen, and many others.

== 1984-2005 ==
After leaving The Record Plant to become an independent recording engineer, Scott found loyalty from his clients and worked on multiple albums by Tom Petty, Wilco, Robbie Robertson, The Red Hot Chili Peppers, Lowen and Navarro, Danzig, the BoDeans, John Fogerty, Natalie Merchant and others. He worked with noted producers Rick Rubin and George Drakoulias during much of that time. It was during this time that Scott began collecting recording equipment and musical instruments as a way to improve the sound of his recordings and the overall experience for his clients.

== 2006-present ==
Scott opened PLYRZ Recording Studio in January 2006. It is in a two-story, 5000-square foot warehouse with multiple rooms. The studio is filled his collection of vintage drums, amps, guitars, keyboards and recording equipment. The control room features a Neve 8048 Console and two Neve BCM-10 sidecars as well as racks of vintage compressors and effects. There is an impressive vintage microphone collection as well. During this time, Jim has worked on albums by The Courtyard Hounds, The Tedeschi Trucks Band, Crowded House, Sixpence None the Richer, Ron Sexsmith, Ryan Bingham, Styx, Hanson and many others.

== Grammy Awards ==
Scott has been nominated for a Grammy Award 17 times, of which he has gained seven.

Year	Nominee/Work	Award	Result
1985	Sting - Dream of the Blue Turtles	Best Engineered Recording non-classical	Nominated
1995	Tom Petty - Wildflowers	Best Engineered Recording non-classical	Won
1995	Tom Petty - Wildflowers	Best Rock Album	Nominated
1998	Rolling Stones - Bridges to Babylon	Best Rock Album	Nominated
1999	Santana - Supernatural	Album of the Year	Won
1999	Red Hot Chili Peppers - Californication	Best Rock Album	Nominated
1999	Tom Petty & The Heartbreakers - Echo	Best Rock Album	Nominated
2000	Rage Against the Machine - Battle of Los Angeles	Best Rock Album	Nominated
2002	Foo Fighters - One by One	Best Rock Album	Won
2002	Audioslave - Audioslave	Best Rock Album	Nominated
2002	Matchbox 20 - More Than You Think You Are	Best Rock Album	Nominated
2005	Jason Mraz - Mr. A-Z	Best Engineered Recording non-classical	Nominated
2006	Dixie Chicks - "Not Ready to Make Nice"	Record of the Year	Won
2006	Dixie Chicks - Taking the Long Way	Album of the Year	Won
2006	Dixie Chicks - Taking the Long Way	Best Country Album	Won
2009	Dido - Safe Trip Home	Best Engineered Recording non-classical	Nominated
2011	The Tedeschi Trucks Band - Revelator	Best Blues Album	Won

He has also worked on numerous other Grammy-nominated and winning albums by such artists as Lucinda Williams, Tift Merritt, Wilco, Robert Randolph and the Family Band and others.

Scott has over 350 album credits.
