= Better Days (Susan Tedeschi album) =

Studio album by Susan Tedeschi
- Released: 29 December 1995
- Recorded: October 24, 1995
- Genre: Blues
- Length: 44:33
- Label: Oarfin
- Producer: Susan Tedeschi

Susan Tedeschi chronology
Better Days (1995)	Just Won't Burn (1998)

Better Days is the debut album by American blues artist Susan Tedeschi, originally released in 1995 under the name Susan Tedeschi Band, but later re-released in 1998 after she found national success with Just Won't Burn.

== Reception ==
Professional ratings
Review scores
Source	Rating
AllMusic	3/5 stars
The Encyclopedia of Popular Music	3/5 stars
The Penguin Guide to Blues Recordings	2.5/4 stars

In a review for AllMusic, Erik Crawford stated that the album "finds Tedeschi's guitar prowess and eminent vocals proliferating the musical landscape in the same manner of blues legends who have gone before her," and wrote that she has "proven herself worthy of sharing the stage with the masters."

The authors of The Penguin Guide to Blues Recordings praised Tedeschi's voice, describing it as "rich in volume, consistency and natural ease, with a use of melisma that hints at classic soul." However, they criticized her lyrics, noting that they "undermine the authority that [she] establishes with her voice."

== Track listing ==
1. "It's up to You" (Lamond, Tedeschi) – 4:19
2. "Gonna Write Him a Letter" (Tedeschi) – 3:05
3. "Love Never Treats Me Right" (Tedeschi) – 2:11
4. "It Hurts Me Too" (James) – 5:04
5. "Locomotive" (Tedeschi) – 4:28
6. "You're on My Hair" [instrumental] (Tedeschi) – 4:12
7. "Better Days" (Hayes) – 6:40
8. "Hound Dog" (Jerry Leiber, Mike Stoller) – 4:03
9. "I Don't Want Nobody" (Robey) – 2:58
10. "Ain't Nobody's Business" (Grainger, Robbins) – 7:33

== Personnel ==
- Susan Tedeschi – guitar, rhythm guitar, vocals
- Adrienne Hayes – guitar, rhythm guitar, slide guitar
- Jim Lamond – bass
- Mike Aiello - drums
- Annie Raines – harmonica

== Production ==
- Susan Tedeschi (producer)
- Rik Tinory (audio engineer)
