= Mike Mattison =

American musician and vocalist

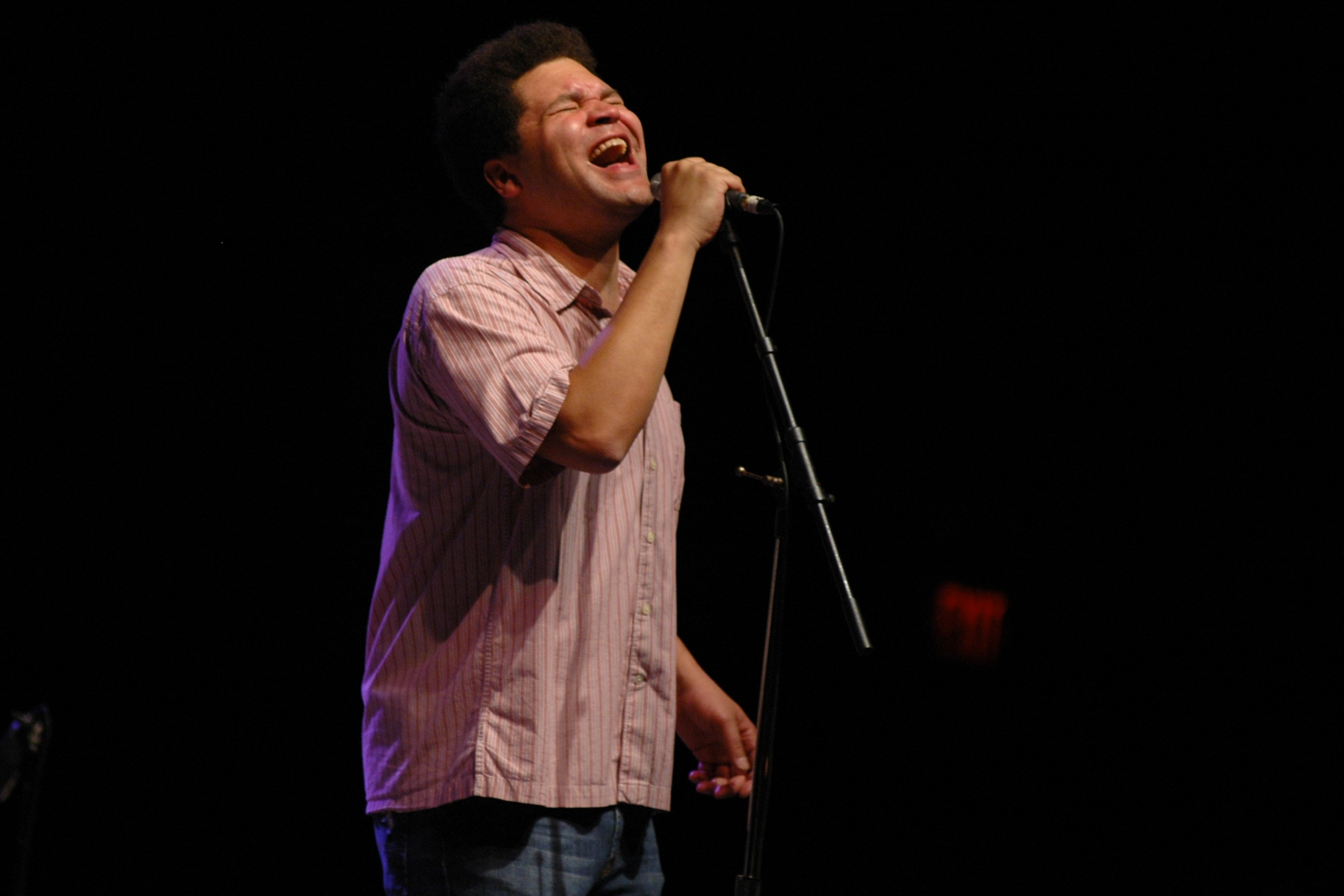
- Mattison fronting Scrapomatic, opening for the Tedeschi Trucks Band

Background information
- Born: December 14, 1969 (age 56)
- Origin: Minneapolis, Minnesota
- Genres: Blues; blues rock; soul; world music; R&B; jazz fusion
- Occupations: Musician; singer; songwriter
- Instruments: Vocals; guitar; piano; saxophone; clarinet; French horn; trombone; double bass
- Labels: Columbia; Alligator; Landslide

Mike Mattison (born December 14, 1969) is an American musician and singer of the blues rock/soul group the Tedeschi Trucks Band, as well as lead vocalist and co-founder of the blues rock trio Scrapomatic. Mattison's vocal sound has been described as "strong", with an "expressive blues voice" who values authenticity in his performances. As lead vocalist of Scrapomatic, he picked up a nomination for Minnesota Music Awards best male vocalist, and both he and co-founder Paul Olsen were also nominated for Best R&B Group. Mattison was previously the lead vocalist of the Derek Trucks Band and has been a main songwriter of all three bands. He is also an active essayist who publishes on music and poetry. Since 2013, Mattison and Ernest Suarez have edited Hot Rocks: Songs and Verse, an ongoing feature in Five Points: A Journal of Literature and Art. He serves on the Council of the Association of Literary Critics, Scholars, and Writers. With both the Derek Trucks Band and Tedeschi Trucks Band, he has won a Grammy for Best Blues Album. Tedeschi Trucks Band has also won five Blues Music Awards from the Blues Music Foundation and two Canadian Maple Blues Awards.

== Biography ==
Mattison was born and grew up in Minneapolis, Minnesota. Before graduation from high school, he'd learned to play the recorder, clarinet, tenor saxophone, french horn, trombone, bass, and guitar, in addition to his ability to sing. He was influenced by jazz, the blues, and roots music. Mattison began exploring songwriting and performing with a friend who had also been raised in Minneapolis, Paul Olsen. The pair met in 1993 at a Parliament-Funkadelic concert, and began playing R&B and blues-based music together afterward. Mattison's education at Harvard University brought him east, and he convinced Olsen to move with him.

Mattison graduated from Harvard with a degree in English and American literature. Mattison and Olsen continued playing and performing together, forming the duo they named Scrapomatic. In 2002, Craig Street and John Snyder, the two record producers who had business ties with blues rock musician Derek Trucks independently suggested Mattison as the person to fill the newly vacated position of lead vocalist for The Derek Trucks Band. Trucks, who was in New York City on business, had seen Mattison's photos and singing demos and was surprised to run into him in the subway. Mattison performed in several concerts of The Derek Trucks Band, following this serendipitous meeting. Shortly afterward, he became a regular member of the band. He continues to maintain his position in Scrapomatic, however, with the duo frequently opening for The Derek Trucks Band.

After listening to the band play the arrangement of "I Wish I Knew" in the style of Nina Simone, an NPR host mentioned a "growly" quality to Mattison's voice, which Trucks was able to closely duplicate on the slide guitar. The next song had a completely different sound altogether, a rendition of a song by Skip James, where Mattison sang in a falsetto. Within The Derek Trucks Band, Mattison's voice has been described as an instrument, rather than that of a focal point as frontman.

In 2010, The Derek Trucks Band announced a hiatus, and Mattison joined the new group, Tedeschi Trucks Band, as a backing vocalist and songwriter. One of his compositions, "Midnight in Harlem", appears on the DVD release of Eric Clapton's Crossroads Guitar Festival 2010.

On July 17, 2013, Mattison launched a Kickstarter Project, called "untitled-not-so-secret-mike-Mattison-solo-album" which successfully raised its funding goal on August 17, 2013.

Mattison released a solo CD You Can't Fight Love on Landslide Records (LDCD-1042) on June 3, 2014. In addition to recording and touring with the Tedeschi Trucks Band and Scrapomatic, Mattison and Ernest Suarez have held seminars on a literary genre they call Poetic Song Verse at various universities since 2016. Their book, Poetic Song Verse: Blues-based Popular Music and Poetry, was published by the University Press of Mississippi in 2021.

Mattison is responsible for the concept behind Tedeschi Trucks Band's 'I Am The Moon' album in May 2020.

In January of 2026, Mattison premiered his project 'Mike Mattison & Trash Magic' with Turn a Midnight Corner, in which he was described as having "just enough country in his voice to stay well balanced on the tightrope of traditional-outlaw & alt-country." Shortly thereafter in March of 2026, he featured as both a writer and performer on Tedeschi Trucks Band's album, Future Soul.

== Discography ==
=== With Scrapomatic ===
- 2002 – Scrapomatic
- 2006 – Alligator Love Cry Alligator Records
- 2008 – Sidewalk Caesars Landslide Records
- 2012 – I’m A Stranger (And I Love The Night) Landslide Records

=== With The Derek Trucks Band ===
- Live at Georgia Theatre (2004)
- Songlines (2006)
- Songlines Live (2006, DVD)
- Already Free (2009)
- Roadsongs (2010)

=== With Tedeschi Trucks Band ===
- Revelator (2011)
- Everybody's Talkin' (2012)
- Made Up Mind (2013)
- Let Me Get By (2016)
- Live from the Fox Oakland (2017)
- Signs (2019)
- I Am the Moon (2022)
- Future Soul (2026)

=== Solo ===
- You Can't Fight Love (Landslide Records, 2014)
- Afterglow (Landslide Records, 2020)
- Turn A Midnight Corner as "Mike Mattison & Trash Magic" (Landslide Records, 2026)

=== Other contributions ===
- Soul Summit (2008) (Maysa, Susan Tedeschi, and Mike Mattison)
