= Live from the Fox Oakland =

Live album by Tedeschi Trucks Band
- Released: March 17, 2017
- Recorded: September 9, 2016
- Venue: Fox Oakland Theatre (Oakland, California)
- Genre: Southern rock, blues rock, jam
- Length: 121:07
- Label: Fantasy
- Producer: Derek Trucks

Tedeschi Trucks Band chronology
Let Me Get By (2016)	Live from the Fox Oakland (2017)	Signs (2019)

Live from the Fox Oakland is the second live album from American rock ensemble Tedeschi Trucks Band. Released on March 17, 2017, through Fantasy Records in both audio and video, the work was recorded on the second night of a two-day September 2016 show in California.

== Reception ==
Professional ratings
Review scores
Source	Rating
AllMusic	3.5/5 stars
American Songwriter	4.5/5 stars
Glide Magazine	8/10 stars

Live from the Fox Oakland was nominated for a Grammy Award for Best Contemporary Blues Album.

In a review for AllMusic, Mark Deming described the music as "a muscular fusion of blues, soul, rock, and funk that's emotionally powerful and technically dazzling," and noted that "the show captures the group in strong form."

Jeff Tamarkin of Relix called the group "probably the best working rock band in America," and wrote: "this document is a time stamp of one ceaselessly creative collective at a key point in its evolution."

American Songwriter's Hal Horowitz stated that the album "puts you in the middle of the music, making this the perfect way to absorb the impact of the Tedeschi Trucks Band firing on all cylinders in their natural habitat."

Writing for The Arts Fuse, Scott McLennan called the album "a wide-angle lens shot that justly captures the Tedeschi Trucks Band in action," and commented: "So much goes on over the course of Live from the Fox Oakland that the TTB upends the notion of a band 'settling' into a sound. Nothing is settling down here; if anything, the band refuses sit in any one spot — it is constantly in motion, kicking up new ideas as it moves forward."

In an article for Glide Magazine, Doug Collette praised "the obvious sense of shared, joyful engagement on the part of everyone playing at any given moment," and described the album as "a peak concert experience."

== Track listing ==
Disc 1
No.	Title	Writer(s)	Length
1.	"Don't Know What It Means"	Derek Trucks, Susan Tedeschi, J. J. Johnson, Kofi Burbridge, Mike Mattison, Tim Lefebvre	7:16
2.	"Keep on Growing"	Bobby Whitlock, Eric Clapton	10:51
3.	"Bird on the Wire"	Leonard Cohen	5:39
4.	"Within You, Without You"	George Harrison	2:30
5.	"Just as Strange"	Trucks, Tedeschi, Doyle Bramhall II	4:27
6.	"Crying Over You"	Trucks, Tedeschi, Mattison	7:57
7.	"These Walls" (Featuring Alam Khan)	Trucks, Eric Krasno, Sonya Kitchell	11:50
8.	"Anyhow"	Trucks, Tedeschi, Mattison	7:34
Total length:			58:04

Disc 2
No.	Title	Writer(s)	Length
9.	"Right on Time"	Trucks, Mattison	4:32
10.	"Leavin' Trunk"	Sleepy John Estes	10:19
11.	"Don't Drift Away"	Trucks, Bramhall, Mattison	6:34
12.	"I Want More (Soul Sacrifice Outro)"	Carlos Santana, David Brown, Gregg Rolie, Trucks, Tedeschi, Bramhall, Mattison	14:30
13.	"I Pity the Fool"	Don Robey	7:54
14.	"Ali"	Miles Davis	8:21
15.	"Let Me Get By"	Trucks, Tedeschi, Mattison, Burbridge, Lefebvre, Tyler Greenwell	10:53
Total length:			63:03

== Personnel ==
Tedeschi Trucks Band

- Susan Tedeschi - vocals, guitar
- Derek Trucks - guitar
- Mike Mattison - acoustic guitar, vocals
- Tim Lefebvre - bass guitar
- Kofi Burbridge - keyboards, flute
- J. J. Johnson - drums, percussion
- Tyler "Falcon" Greenwell - drums, percussion
- Kebbi Williams - Saxophone
- Elizabeth Lea - Trombone
- Ephraim Owens - Trumpet
- Alecia Chakour, Mark Rivers - vocals

Guest musicians

- Alam Khan - sarode

Production

- Derek Trucks - producer
- Bob Ludwig - mastering
- Bobby Tis - mixed by, recorded by, monitor engineer, guitar tech, stage tech
- Brian Speiser - mixed by, recorded by, production manager
- Duncan Lothlan - production assistant, drum tech
- Ryan Murphy - guitar tech, stage tech
- Brian Pirrone - lighting engineer
- Stuart Levine, Vikas Nambiar - photography
- David Trucks - studio operations

== Chart positions ==
Chart (2017)	Peak position
Swiss Albums (Schweizer Hitparade)	31
US Billboard 200	39
