= Revelator (Tedeschi Trucks Band album) =

Studio album by Tedeschi Trucks Band
- Released: June 7, 2011
- Recorded: 2011
- Studios: Swamp Raga Studios (Jacksonville, Florida)
- Genres: Rock; blues rock; blues; soul
- Length: 61:06
- Labels: Sony Masterworks; Sony Music Entertainment
- Producers: Jim Scott; Derek Trucks

Tedeschi Trucks Band chronology
Revelator (2011)	Everybody's Talkin' (2012)

Revelator is the debut album by the 11-piece American blues rock group Tedeschi Trucks Band released on June 7, 2011, by Sony Masterworks. Recorded in Derek and Susan's Swamp Raga Studios in Jacksonville, co-produced by Derek with producer/engineer Jim Scott. The album won the Grammy Award for Best Blues Album at the 54th Annual Grammy Awards.

== Reception ==
Professional ratings
Review scores
Source	Rating
Allmusic	4/5 stars
Rolling Stone	4/5 stars

Allmusic music critic Thom Jurek praised the album and wrote the recording "proves something beyond their well-founded reputation as a live unit: that they can write, perform, and produce great songs that capture the authentic, emotional fire and original arrangements that so many modern blues and roots recordings lack... Revelator is a roots record that sets a modern standard even as it draws its inspiration from the past. It's got everything a listener could want: grit, groove, raw, spiritual emotion, and expert-level musical truth." David Fricke of Rolling Stone wrote "[Trucks] and Tedeschi, a perfect vocal foil, now front the best Dixie-funk family band since Delaney and Bonnie Bramlett."

== Track listing ==
No.	Title	Writer(s)	Length
1.	"Come See About Me"	Derek Trucks; Susan Tedeschi; Tyler Greenwell; Mike Mattison; Theodore Pecchio	3:48
2.	"Don't Let Me Slide"	Trucks; Tedeschi; Gary Michael Louris	5:04
3.	"Midnight in Harlem"	Trucks; Mattison	5:52
4.	"Bound for Glory"	Trucks; Tedeschi; Mattison	5:28
5.	"Simple Things"	Trucks; Tedeschi; Louris	4:43
6.	"Until You Remember"	Trucks; Tedeschi; John Leventhal	6:11
7.	"Ball and Chain"	Trucks; Tedeschi; Oliver Wood	3:58
8.	"These Walls"	Trucks; Eric Krasno; Sonya Kitchell	6:01
9.	"Learn How to Love"	Trucks; Tedeschi; Krasno; Adam Deitch; Adam Smirnoff	4:23
10.	"Shrimp and Grits (Interlude)" (instrumental)	Trucks; Tedeschi; Oteil Burbridge; Kofi Burbridge; Tyler Greenwell; J. J. Johnson	1:45
11.	"Love Has Something Else to Say"	Trucks; Mattison; O. Burbridge; Doyle Bramhall II	5:55
12.	"Shelter"	Trucks; Tedeschi; David Ryan Harris	4:20
13.	"Ghost Light" (hidden track, instrumental)	Trucks; O. Burbridge; K. Burbridge; Greenwell; Johnson	3:38
Total length:			61:06

== Personnel ==
- Derek Trucks – slide guitar
- Susan Tedeschi – lead vocals, rhythm guitar
- Oteil Burbridge – bass guitar
- Kofi Burbridge – keyboards, flute
- Tyler Greenwell – drums, percussion
- J. J. Johnson – drums, percussion
- Mike Mattison – harmony vocals
- Mark Rivers – harmony vocals
- Kebbi Williams – saxophone
- Maurice "Mobetta" Brown – trumpet
- Saunders Sermons – trombone

== Additional musicians ==
- Oliver Wood – guitar and vocals
- David Ryan Harris – guitar and vocals
- Ryan Shaw – harmony vocals
- Eric Krasno – acoustic guitar
- Alam Khan – sarod
- Salar Nader – tabla

== Credits ==
- Producers – Jim Scott and Derek Trucks
- Engineers – Jim Scott and Bobby Tis
- Additional Engineer – Kevin Dean
- Mixing – Jim Scott
- Mastering – Bob Ludwig
- Art Direction – Josh Cheuse
- Photography – James Minchin

== Charts ==
Chart performance
Chart (2011)	Peak position
Australian Albums (ARIA)	71
Canadian Albums (Nielsen SoundScan)	92
Dutch Albums (Album Top 100)	83
German Albums (Offizielle Top 100)	65
New Zealand Albums (RMNZ)	38
Swiss Albums (Schweizer Hitparade)	55
UK Albums (Official Charts)	164
UK Jazz & Blues Albums (Official Charts)	11
US Billboard 200	12
US Top Blues Albums (Billboard)	1
US Top Rock Albums (Billboard)	4
