= Susan Tedeschi =

American blues musician (born 1970)

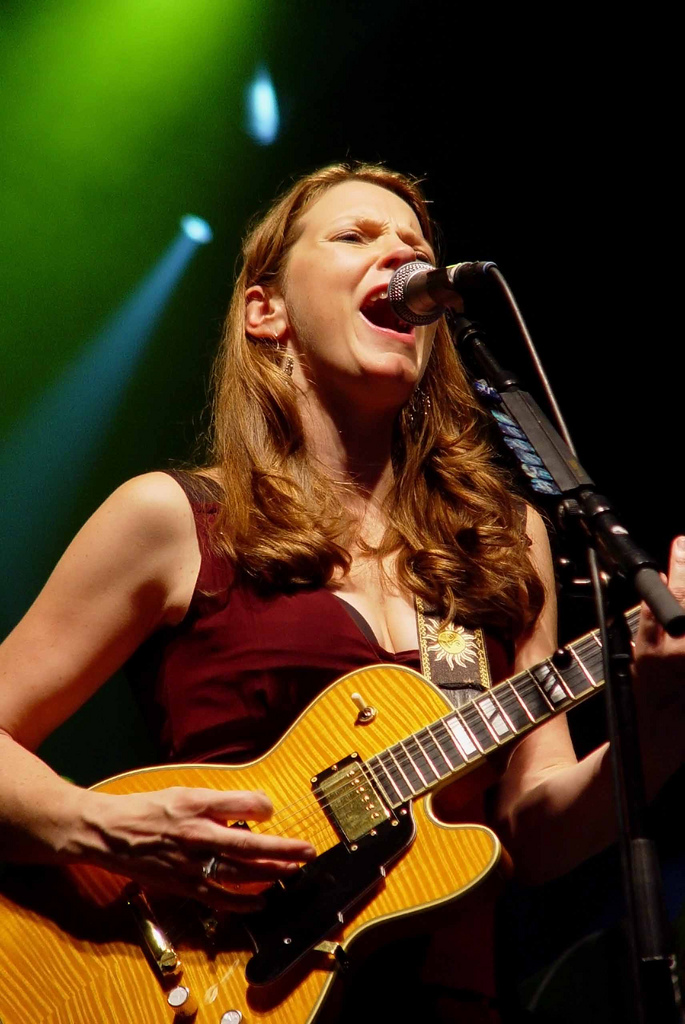
- Tedeschi in the Netherlands, 2006

Background information
- Born: November 9, 1970 (age 55); Boston, Massachusetts, U.S.
- Genres: Blues; Americana
- Occupations: Singer; musician; songwriter
- Instruments: Vocals; guitar
- Years active: 1995–present
- Labels: Verve Forecast; Rounder; Mercury; Tone-Cool
- Member of: Tedeschi Trucks Band
- Formerly of: The Susan Tedeschi Band; Soul Stew Revival; The Other Ones
- Website: susantedeschi.com

Susan Tedeschi (/təˈdɛski/; born November 9, 1970) is an American singer and guitarist. A multiple Grammy Award nominee, she is a member of the Tedeschi Trucks Band, a conglomeration of her band, her husband Derek Trucks' band, and other musicians.

== Early life ==
Tedeschi was born on November 9, 1970, in Boston to a family of Italian ancestry and grew up in Norwell, Massachusetts. She is the daughter of Dick Tedeschi, granddaughter of Nick Tedeschi, and the great-granddaughter of Angelo Tedeschi who founded Tedeschi Food Shops, a New England–based supermarket and convenience store chain. Susan made her public debut as a five-year-old understudy in a Broadway musical. As a youth, she sang for family members and listened to her father's record collection of old vinyl recordings of musicians such as Mississippi John Hurt and Lightnin' Hopkins. Growing up Catholic, she found little inspiration in the church choir and attended predominantly African-American Baptist churches, feeling that the music was "less repressed and more like a celebration of God." In bands since the age of 13, Tedeschi formed her first all-original group at 18, the Smokin' Section, in the nearby town of Scituate.

After graduating from Norwell High School in Norwell, Susan Tedeschi attended the Berklee College of Music, where she sang in a gospel choir. She performed show tunes on the Spirit of Boston (a ship) and received her Bachelor of Music degree in musical composition and performance at age 20. During that time, Tedeschi began sitting in on blues jams at local venues and immersed herself in the Boston music scene.

== Career ==
=== Early career ===
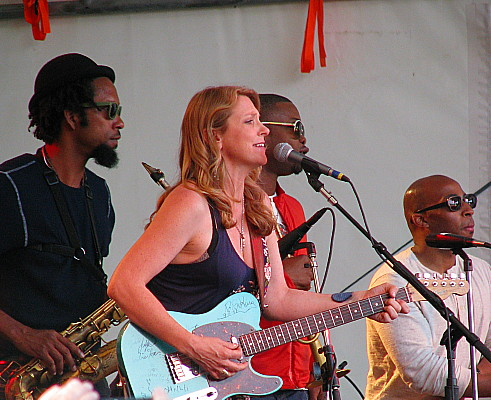
Susan Tedeschi and the Tedeschi Trucks Band at the Appel Farm Arts and Music Festival, June 2012; Kebbi Williams on saxophone, Maurice Brown on trumpet, and Saunders Sermons on trombone are in the background (left to right)

Tedeschi formed the Susan Tedeschi Band in 1993, with Adrienne Hayes, Jim Lamond and Mike Aiello. In December 1995, the band released Better Days to regional audiences. The 1997 recording sessions produced by Tom Hambridge were acquired by Richard Rosenblatt for his indie label Tone-Cool Records. The result is the first album released in February 1998 under the sole name of Susan Tedeschi; Just Won't Burn, featuring young guitarist Sean Costello, received very positive reviews, particularly from critics and blues publications.

Tedeschi was the first artist to play Michele Clark's first Sunset Sessions in March 1998 at the Marriott Hotels & Resorts in the United States Virgin Islands. In 1999, Tedeschi played several dates in the all-woman traveling festival Lilith Fair organized by Sarah McLachlan. Throughout 1998 and 1999, she extensively toured the United States and drew larger crowds.

=== As an opening act ===
Eventually Tedeschi was opening for John Mellencamp, B.B. King, Buddy Guy, The Allman Brothers Band, Taj Mahal, and Bob Dylan. In 2000, Just Won't Burn (1998) reached Gold record status for sales of 500,000 in the United States, rare for a blues production. She recorded two tracks with Double Trouble band members Chris Layton and Tommy Shannon for their album.

She opened for The Rolling Stones in 2003 and played in huge venues, gaining national exposure. The gig was not financially lucrative. According to Tedeschi, "They pay, but it's not great. I don't make any money 'cause I've got to pay all my sidemen. I'll be lucky if I break even." In 2004, Tedeschi was featured on the PBS television program Austin City Limits with William Green on Hammond organ; Jason Crosby on keyboards, violin, and vocals; Ron Perry on bass; and Jeff Sipe on drums.

=== Soul Stew Revival ===
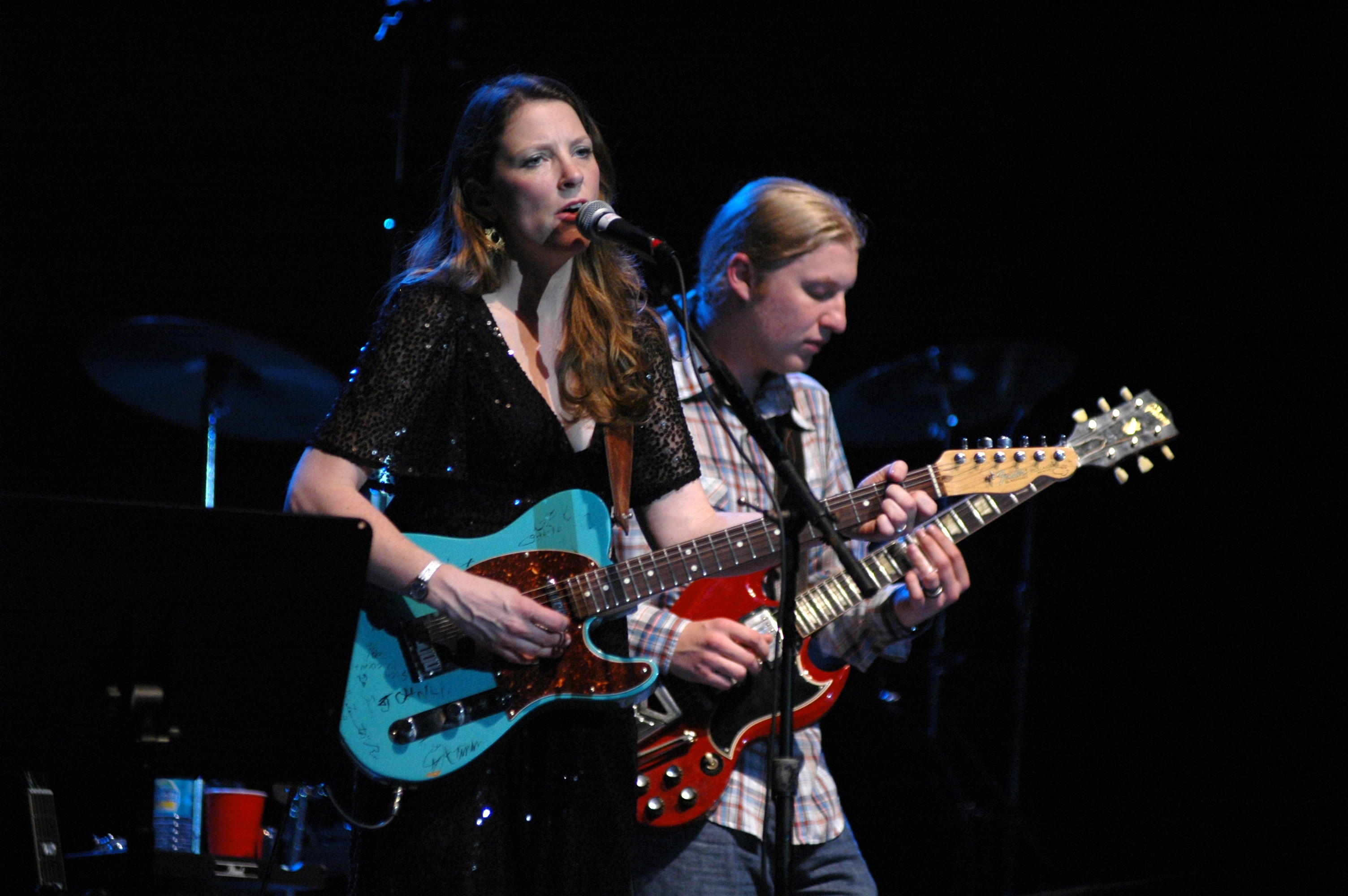
Soul Stew Revival at Mizner Park in Boca Raton, Florida, with Derek Trucks, December 2007

While in New Orleans opening for the Allman Brothers Band on their 1999 summer tour, Tedeschi met Derek Trucks; Trucks was slide guitarist for the band, and bandleader and lead guitarist of The Derek Trucks Band. In addition to a personal relationship, Tedeschi and Trucks then toured together frequently under the name Soul Stew Revival. SSR included members of The Derek Trucks Band, members of Tedeschi's band, and other musicians who traveled with them, including Trucks' younger brother, drummer Duane Trucks. In 2008, they added a three-piece horn section.

=== The Other Ones ===
In 2002, Tedeschi toured as a member of the Other Ones, a band comprising former Grateful Dead members Bob Weir, Phil Lesh, Mickey Hart, and Bill Kreutzmann, along with Jimmy Herring, Rob Barraco, and Jeff Chimenti.

=== Tedeschi Trucks Band ===
Susan Tedeshi performing with the Tedeschi Trucks Band at the St. Augustine Amphitheatre, October 2026

In 2010, Tedeschi and Trucks announced a hiatus for their solo bands, and formed a new group called Tedeschi Trucks Band. The group performed at a number of festivals including Eric Clapton's Crossroads Guitar Festival, Fuji Rock Festival and others. Unlike their previous collaborative project–Derek Trucks & Susan Tedeschi's Soul Stew Revival–the Tedeschi Trucks Band focuses on writing and performing original material and is the focus of both Trucks and Tedeschi for the foreseeable future.

Layla Revisited (Live at LOCKN') was announced on May 7, 2021. The album is a one-time live recording of the Derek and The Dominos album Layla and Other Assorted Love Songs performed in full with Trey Anastasio. Recorded on August 24, 2019, at the Lockn' Festival in Arrington, Virginia, the album was released on July 16, 2021.

== Personal life ==
On December 5, 2001, Tedeschi married Derek Trucks. They have two children: Charles Kahlil Trucks, born in March 2002, is named for saxophonist Charlie Parker, guitarist Charlie Christian, and author Kahlil Gibran; and Sophia Naima Trucks, born in 2004, who takes her middle name from the ballad composed by John Coltrane, in honor of his first wife. They reside in Jacksonville, Florida.

Tedeschi arranged the Berklee scholarship which was awarded to Adrianne Lenker, lead singer, guitarist and songwriter of the Grammy-nominated rock band Big Thief.

== Influences ==
Tedeschi's voice has been described as a blend of Bonnie Raitt and Janis Joplin, both of whom she claims as influences. Her guitar playing is influenced by Buddy Guy, Johnny "Guitar" Watson, Stevie Ray Vaughan, Freddie King and Doyle Bramhall II. On the album Just Won't Burn (1998), Tedeschi lists a multitude of inspirations from various genres. The list includes Irma Thomas, Etta James, Bob Marley, Toots Hibbert, Aretha Franklin, Otis Rush, Ronnie Earl, Otis Clay, Ray Charles, Billie Holiday, Bob Dylan, Dennis Montgomery III, Orville Wright, Walter Beasley, Kenya Hathaway, and Mahalia Jackson.

== Award nominations ==
- 2000 Grammy nomination for Best New Artist
- 2003 Grammy nomination for Best Female Rock Vocal Performance
- 2004 Grammy nomination for Best Contemporary Blues Album for Wait For Me
- 2006 Grammy nomination for Best Contemporary Blues Album for Hope and Desire
- 2010 Grammy nomination for Best Contemporary Blues Album for Back to the River
- 2016 Americana Music Award for Duo/Group of the Year (with Tedeschi Trucks Band)
- 2017 Grammy nomination for Best Contemporary Blues Album for Live from the Fox Oakland

== Awards won ==
- 2022 James Smithson Bicentennial Medal for “her embodiment of the American Experience through music; for imbuing the American soundtrack with songs that transcend from grief to joy; for staying true to her art form and for using her voice to share stories of hope in advocating for a better world”
- 2012 Grammy Award for Best Blues Album for Revelator (with Tedeschi Trucks Band)
- 2014 Blues Music Award for Contemporary Female Blues Artist of the Year
- 2014 Blues Music Award for Band of the Year (with Tedeschi Trucks Band)
- 2014 Blues Music Award for Rock Blues Album of the Year for "Made Up Mind" (with Tedeschi Trucks Band)
- 2017 Blues Music Award for Rock Blues Album of the Year for "Let Me Get By" (with Tedeschi Trucks Band)
- 2017 Blues Music Award for Band of the Year (with Tedeschi Trucks Band)
- 2017 Blues Music Award for Contemporary Female Blues Artist of the Year

Tedeschi served as a judge for the 7th annual Independent Music Awards.

== Discography ==
=== Studio albums ===
- Better Days (Oarfin, 1995)
- Just Won't Burn (Tone Cool, 1998)
- Wait for Me (Tone Cool, 2002)
- Hope and Desire (Verve Forecast, 2005)
- Back to the River (Verve Forecast, 2008)

Live albums

- Live from Austin, TX (New West, 2004)

With the Tedeschi Trucks Band

- Revelator (Masterworks, 2011)
- Everybody's Talkin' (Masterworks, 2012)
- Made Up Mind (Masterworks, 2013)
- Let Me Get By (Fantasy, 2016)
- Live from the Fox Oakland (Fantasy, 2017)
- Signs (Fantasy, 2019)
- Layla Revisited (Live at Lockn') (Fantasy, 2021)
- I Am the Moon (Fantasy, 2022)
- Mad Dogs & Englishmen Revisited (Live at Lockn') (Fantasy, 2025)
- Future Soul (Fantasy, 2026)

=== As guest ===
- Welcome to Little Milton (1999), Little Milton
- Joyful Noise (2002), Derek Trucks Band
- Already Free (2009), Derek Trucks Band
- Truth (2007), Robben Ford
- Bug (Lionsgate, 2007), Various Artists
- Skin Deep (2008), Buddy Guy
- "Space Captain", The Imagine Project (2010), Herbie Hancock with Derek Trucks
- "Burn it Down", Tin Can Trust (2010), Los Lobos
- "Bright Lights, Big City", Roots (2011), Johnny Winter
- "Mixed Drinks About Feelings", Mr. Misunderstood (2015), Eric Church
- "Ain't No Thing", Wynonna & the Big Noise (2016), Wynonna Judd
- "Color of the Blues", For Better, or Worse (2016), John Prine
- Song of Lahore (Universal, 2016), The Sachal Ensemble with Derek Trucks
- "Cortez The Killer" (2019), Dave Matthews Band
- "The Sky is Crying" (2023), Jeff Beck Tribute
