= Nothing but the Blues (film) =

- Starring: Eric Clapton
- Narrated by: Eric Clapton
- Edited by: Lisa Day · Jon Vesey
- Music by: Various Artists
- Distributed by: Warner · Reprise
- Release date: June 19, 1995 (United States)
- Running time: 108
- Country: United States
- Language: English

Nothing but the Blues is a 1995 documentary film about Eric Clapton's musical journey and his love for Blues music. Martin Scorsese was one of the executive producers. It is not to be confused with the 2003 album release Martin Scorsese Presents the Blues: Eric Clapton.

== Content ==
The film features live performances of blues standards covered by Eric Clapton as well as historical video footage of blues musicians of various generations including Howlin' Wolf, B.B. King, Muddy Waters, Buddy Guy, T-Bone Walker, Little Walter, Freddie King and Jimmy Rogers. Eric Clapton also talks with Martin Scorsese about his personal musical journey and how the past blues legends have influenced his style and approach to music. The recording sessions took place on November 8, and November 9, 1994, at the Fillmore in San Francisco, California.

== Soundtrack ==
=== Film ===
- “Blues All Day Long”
- “Standin’ Round Crying”
- “Forty-Four”
- “It Hurts Me Too”
- “Early In The Morning”
- “Five Long Years”
- “Crossroads”
- “Malted Milk Blues”
- “Motherless Child”
- “How Long Blues”
- “Reconsider Baby”
- “Sinner’s Prayer”
- “Every Day I Have The Blues”
- “Crosscut Saw”
- “Someday After A While”
- “Have You Ever Loved A Woman”
- “I’m Tore Down”
- “Groaning The Blues”
- “T’Ain’t Nobody’s Bizness”

The home video release also includes Driftin' as a bonus feature.

=== CD ===
No.	Title	Recording Date	Length
1.	"Blues All Day Long"	Nov 9	4:20
2.	"Standin' Round Crying"	Nov 9	4:52
3.	"Forty-Four"	Nov 9	4:18
4.	"It Hurts Me Too"	Nov 9	3:18
5.	"Early In The Morning"	Nov 9	5:05
6.	"Five Long Years"	Nov 8	5:22
7.	"Crossroads"	Nov 9	6:18
8.	"Malted Milk Blues"	Nov 8	2:46
9.	"Motherless Child"	Nov 8	3:25
10.	"How Long Blues"	Nov 8	3:25
11.	"Reconsider Baby"	Nov 9	3:40
12.	"Sinner's Prayer"	Nov 9	3:50
13.	"Every Day I Have The Blues"	Nov 8	4:50
14.	"Someday After A While"	Nov 9	3:44
15.	"Have You Ever Loved A Woman"	Nov 8	6:52
16.	"I'm Tore Down"	Nov 9	3:25
17.	"Groaning The Blues"	Nov 8	7:10

The 2 LP version of the soundtrack includes County Jail Blues as an additional bonus track. The Super Deluxe Edition comes with a bonus CD containing Driftin', County Jail Blues, Kid Man Blues, Too Bad.

== Release ==
The film was released on June 19, 1995, in the United States via the PBS broadcasting companies around the country. The film was released in colour and has no content advisory for parents on it.

The film was not released on home video until 2022, for unclear reasons. Originally, the plan was set by Martin Scorsese to release the movie in summer of 1995. However, later Warner Reprise Video produced some promotional tapes on VHS and DVD for limited release. Since then, the film has been uploaded to various internet platforms, making it widely accessible. In 2022, Reprise Records announced that the film has been remastered in 4K and will be released for the first time on Blu-ray and DVD. The soundtrack was also released in June 2022.

== Reception ==
Martin Scorsese, David Horn, John Beug, Stephen 'Scooter' Weintraub and Ken Ehrlich were nominated for the Outstanding Cultural Program Primetime Emmy Award at the 1995 Emmy Awards.

== Personnel ==
Musicians

- Eric Clapton – guitar · vocals
- Andy Fairweather Low – guitar
- Jerry Portnoy – harmonica
- Chris Stainton – piano
- Dave Bronze – bass
- Andy Newmark – drums · percussion
- The Kick Horns – horn section

Production

- Martin Scorsese – executive producer
- John Beug – executive producer
- David Horn – executive producer
- Ken Ehrlich – producer
- Stephen 'Scooter' Weintraub – producer
- Jon Vesey – editor
- Lisa Day – editor
- Kenneth C. Barrows – camera operator
- Anthony Hardwick – assistant camera
- Tom Kenny – lighting director
- John C. Morgan – lighting director
