= Ephraim Owens =

American musician, composer, and jazz bandleader

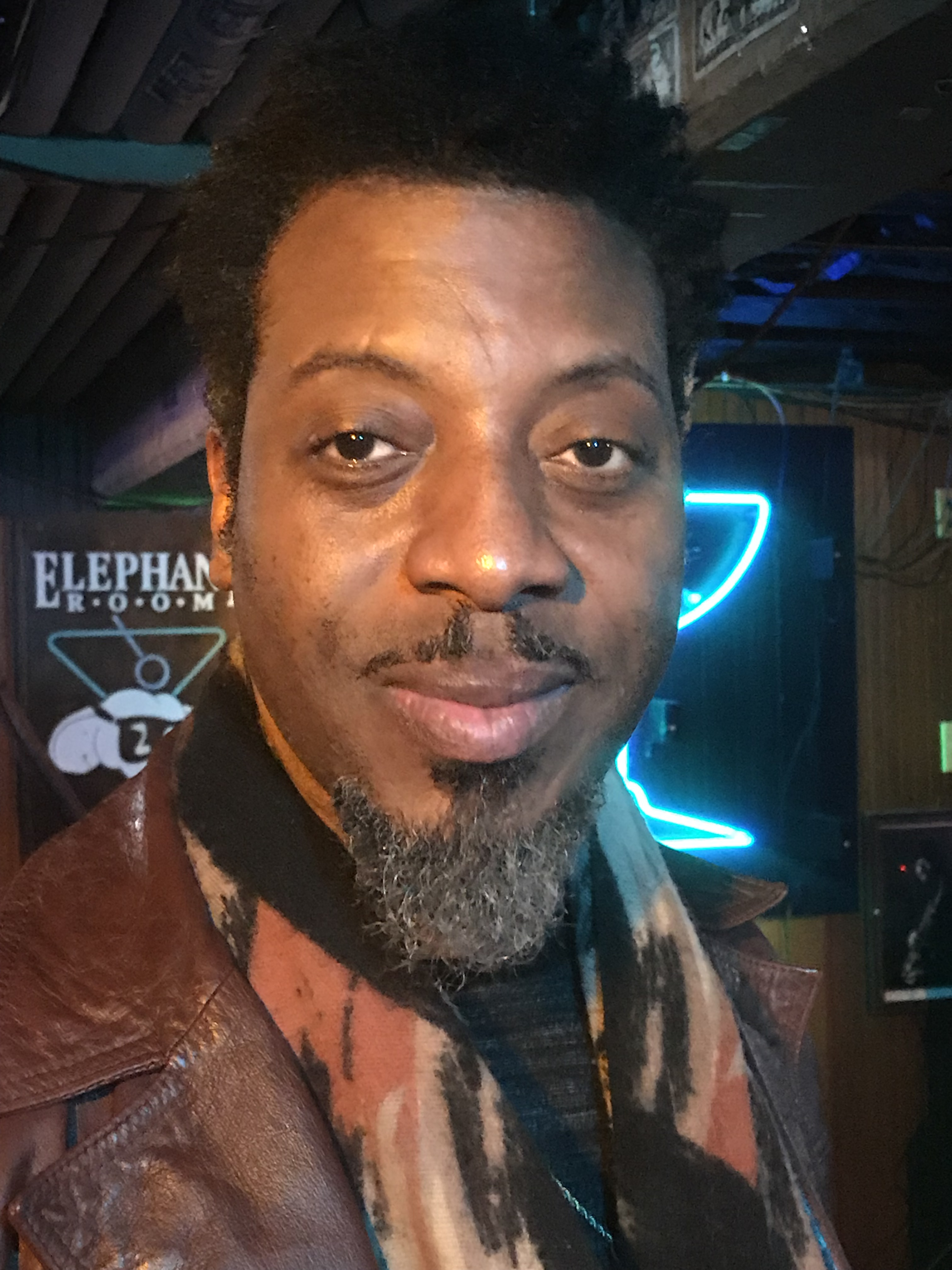
- Owens in 2019

Background information
- Born: November 5, 1972 (age 53); Dallas, Texas, United States
- Genres: Jazz
- Occupations: Musician; composer
- Instruments: Trumpet; flugelhorn
- Years active: 1994–present
- Website: www.ephraimowensmusic.com

Ephraim Owens (born November 5, 1972) is an American musician, composer, and jazz bandleader who plays trumpet and flugelhorn. He toured and recorded with the Tedeschi Trucks Band for 10 years. He is one of the most highly regarded jazz musicians living in Austin, Texas, and he focuses on performing in that genre when he is not touring.

== Early life ==
Ephraim Owens was born in Dallas, Texas on November 5, 1972, the son of John Henry Owens, an aviation mechanic, and Mary Alice Lee. He took up cornet in the third grade in order to be in the school band, and he was soon playing trumpet at the family’s Pentecostal church. As a youth, he studied trumpet in the classical vein. His father insisted that he audition for Booker T. Washington High School for the Performing and Visual Arts. Though already interested in jazz when he enrolled, Owens says that when he heard then-senior Roy Hargrove play trumpet, “That was it,” and he has credited Hargrove as his most direct influence.

Owens attended Weatherford College to study classical trumpet and was recruited to continue his studies at Southwest Texas State University in San Marcos, Texas, where he studied with jazz pianist James Polk. From there he commuted to gigs in Austin, where he soon gained notice as a "sensational new talent." He decided to leave college and move to Austin in 1996 to pursue his career full time.

== Career ==
Owens soon became a fixture in the Austin music scene. Austin Mayor Bruce Todd proclaimed June 14, 1997, as Ephraim Owens Day.

Owens has toured and recorded with a variety of artists across a range of genres. He appeared on Bulletproof, the 2008 studio album by country-rock band Reckless Kelly and has recorded with bluesman Jimmie Vaughan. In a 2016 interview, he named Sheryl Crow, Mumford & Sons, and Patty Griffin as artists with whom he particularly enjoyed collaborating.

In 2015, Owens joined the "blues-rock juggernaut" Tedeschi Trucks Band, which has "kept him living out of suitcases since.". He returned to Austin from tour on March 9, 2020, just as the COVID-19 pandemic shut down live music performances. He appears on the band's albums Live from the Fox Oakland, Signs and I Am the Moon.

For his personal artistic expression, Owens prefers jazz, he says, because, "Jazz covers all the bases of music. … [Jazz has] freedom of structure … There’s free [rein] of thought and more conflict than in any other kind of music." He regularly performs jazz during stints at home in Austin between tour dates and is one of Austin's most highly regarded practitioners of the art form. His composition MoMoCi is a staple of his live performances in Austin.

Owens is the recipient of eight Austin Music Awards, which are given out based on votes of readers of the Austin Chronicle. Owens was voted best horn player in 2012, 2013, 2015, 2016, and 2017, inducted into the Austin Music Hall of Fame in 2017, and received the award for "Best Performing Band (Jazz)" in 2018 and 2020.

== See also ==
- Music of Austin
