= I Am the Moon =

Studio album by Tedeschi Trucks Band
- Released: September 9, 2022
- Recorded: 2021–22
- Studio: Swamp Raga Studios (Jacksonville, Florida)
- Genre: Blues rock
- Length: 130:28
- Label: Fantasy

Tedeschi Trucks Band chronology
Signs (2019)	I Am the Moon (2022)	Future Soul (2026)

Professional ratings
Review scores
Source	Rating
The Arts Fuse	—
Rolling Stone	—
Ultimate Classic Rock	—
Live For Live Music	—
NPR	—
Glide Magazine	—
Spectrum Culture	77%
Entertainment Focus	—

I Am the Moon is the fifth studio album by American blues rock group Tedeschi Trucks Band. It is a quadruple album which was initially released in four separate parts over consecutive full moons in 2022: Crescent (released on June 3), Ascension (released on July 1), The Fall (released on July 29) and Farewell (released on August 26), with each album including a corresponding short film. The completed album was released via Fantasy Records on September 9, 2022 and is the band's first since 2019's Signs.

Conceptually, the project is based on the story of Layla and Majnun, a romantic poem of Arabian origin about star-crossed lovers.

It was ranked as the 10th best guitar album of 2022 by Guitar World readers.

== Track listing ==
Credits adapted from AllMusic.
I Am the Moon I: Crescent

No.	Title	Writer(s)	Length
1.	"Hear My Dear"	Derek Trucks, Gabe Dixon, Susan Tedeschi	5:34
2.	"Fall In"	Mike Mattison	5:47
3.	"I Am the Moon"	Dixon	5:14
4.	"Circles 'Round the Sun"	Trucks, Tedeschi, Tyler Greenwell	6:16
5.	"Pasaquan"	Brandon Boone, Trucks, Dixon, Isaac Eady, Greenwell	12:15
Total length:			35:07

I Am the Moon II: Ascension

No.	Title	Writer(s)	Length
1.	"Playing with My Emotions"	Trucks, Dixon, Mattison	4:10
2.	"Ain't That Something"	Trucks, Dixon, Mattison, Tedeschi	5:28
3.	"All the Love"	Trucks, Dixon, Tedeschi, Greenwell	9:03
4.	"So Long Savior"	Trucks, Mattison, Tedeschi	2:39
5.	"Rainy Day"	Trucks, Dixon, Mattison, Tedeschi	4:47
6.	"La Di Da"	Dixon, Mattison, Tedeschi	4:10
7.	"Hold That Line"	Trucks, Dixon, Tedeschi, Greenwell	6:06
Total length:			36:23

I Am the Moon III: The Fall

No.	Title	Writer(s)	Length
1.	"Somehow"	Dixon, Tia Sellers	5:09
2.	"None Above"	Mattison, Tedeschi	2:33
3.	"Yes We Will"	Tedeschi	6:31
4.	"Gravity"	Dixon, Oliver Wood	6:44
5.	"Emmaline"	Mattison	3:34
6.	"Take Me as I Am"	Trucks, Dixon, Mattison, Tedeschi	5:27
Total length:			29:58

I Am the Moon IV: Farewell

No.	Title	Writer(s)	Length
1.	"Last Night in the Rain"	Trucks, Dixon, Tedeschi, Greenwell	4:53
2.	"Soul Sweet Song"	Trucks, Dixon, Mattison	3:55
3.	"D'Gary"	Trucks, Tedeschi	6:44
4.	"Where Are My Friends?"	Trucks, Mattison	5:20
5.	"I Can Feel You Smiling"	Trucks, Dixon, Wood	3:47
6.	"Another Day"	Trucks, Dixon, Mattison, Tedeschi	4:26
Total length:			29:05

== Personnel ==
- Brandon Boone - bass guitar; baritone guitar (disc II 2, 4; disc III 5), additional acoustic guitar (disc II 6)
- Isaac Eady - drums, percussion; additional acoustic guitar (disc II 6)
- Gabe Dixon - keyboards, vocals; lead vocals (disc I 1, 3; disc II 2, 7; disc III 4; disc IV 2, 4), acoustic guitar (disc I 3), additional acoustic guitar (disc II 6)
- Tyler Greenwell - drums, percussion; acoustic guitar (disc I 4; disc II 7), additional acoustic guitar (disc II 6)
- Susan Tedeschi - lead vocals (except disc I 2, 5; disc II 6; disc III 5); guitar (disc I 2, 3, 4; disc II 1, 2, 6; disc III; disc IV 4), drums (disc II 4)
- Derek Trucks - lead and rhythm guitars (except disc III 1); steel guitar (disc I 2), acoustic guitar (disc I 1, 3; disc IV 4, 5), additional acoustic guitar (disc II 6), percussion (disc II 4; disc IV 6), tabla (disc II 7)
- Kebbi Williams - saxophone; flute (disc II 7)
- Elizabeth Lea - trombone
- Ephraim Owens - trumpet
- Alecia Chakour - vocals; additional percussion (disc I 1, 2, 4; disc II 2, 5; disc III 1; disc IV 2, 6)
- Mike Mattison - vocals; lead vocals (disc I 2; disc III 5), acoustic guitar (disc III 2, 3, 5; disc IV 6), additional acoustic guitar (disc II 6)
- Mark Rivers - vocals; lead vocals (disc III 6), additional percussion (disc I 1, 2, 4; disc II 2; disc IV 6)

Additional musicians

- Adrian Jackson - sousaphone (disc I 2; disc II 6; disc III 4, 5)
- Paul Olsen - acoustic guitar (disc I 3; disc II 1, 6; disc III 2, 6; disc IV 1, 4)
- Marc Quiñones - congas, additional percussion (disc I 3; disc II 1, 5; disc III 1, 3, 4; disc IV 2)
- St. EOM - dialog (disc I 4)
- Eric Krasno - lead and rhythm guitar (disc IV 4)

== Charts ==
Crescent

Chart (2022)	Peak position
Swiss Albums (Schweizer Hitparade)	34
US Top Current Album Sales (Billboard)	18
US Americana/Folk Albums (Billboard)	23
US Top Blues Albums (Billboard)	1

Ascension

Chart (2022)	Peak position
Swiss Albums (Schweizer Hitparade)	16
US Top Current Album Sales (Billboard)	17
US Americana/Folk Albums (Billboard)	17
US Top Blues Albums (Billboard)	1

The Fall

Chart (2022)	Peak position
Swiss Albums (Schweizer Hitparade)	14
US Top Current Album Sales (Billboard)	22
US Americana/Folk Albums (Billboard)	16
US Top Blues Albums (Billboard)	1

Farewell

Chart (2022)	Peak position
Swiss Albums (Schweizer Hitparade)	14
US Top Current Album Sales (Billboard)	17
US Americana/Folk Albums (Billboard)	13
US Top Blues Albums (Billboard)	2
