= Dennis Montgomery III =

American pianist, organist, and professor (born 1965)

Dennis Montgomery III (born June 19, 1965, in Shreveport, Louisiana) is a pianist, organist, and professor. Montgomery has been the director for the Berklee College of Music Reverence Gospel Ensemble for nearly 30 years.

== Childhood ==
Montgomery grew up singing and playing in Baptist churches around the upper Louisiana area under the tutelage of his father and mother, Dennis Montgomery II and Eddie Mae Montgomery. By the time he was nine years old Montgomery was proficient enough on the Hammond B3 Organ to get hired to work alongside his father at Stonewall Baptist Church and also at nearby St. Mary's Baptist Church. Montgomery's father, who played mostly by ear, was the minister of music at Stonewall Baptist Church in Shreveport but he was not the only one playing into Montgomery's life. Montgomery's mother also played organ but unlike her husband was trained classically which only continued to broaden Montgomery's musical horizons.

== Education ==
Montgomery came to Berklee College of Music in 1983, declared piano as his principal instrument and majored in Music Education. Shortly after his arrival at Berklee, he immediately headed for the gospel choir which at that time was only an extra curricular activity. Montgomery soon joined the choir as a student director and accompanist to assist former Berklee faculty member Orville Wright. A year after his arrival with the choir, Montgomery saw the addition of the gospel choir to the permanent curriculum with an academic weight of two credits. Because of Montgomery's strong belief of being wholly educated in whatever field one might study, he was very pleased with the adding of the choir to the school's curriculum. When asked why he thought the addition of the choir was crucial to the school he said, “We know that jazz has its roots in the negro spiritual, which is gospel music. Gospel is also the mother of a lot of other secular music that America has produced."

== Reverence Gospel Ensemble ==
Montgomery graduated from Berklee College of Music in 1988 and assumed the direction of the Reverence Gospel Ensemble as a full-time faculty member. Since Montgomery attained complete direction of the choir, they have become one of the best known groups of the college both far and wide. Montgomery believes that the choir is a fundamental ingredient of the American experience for international students, which is probably why students from all over Asia, South America, Europe, and Australia all come to be a part of the choir. Montgomery states, “When I was young, I had to learn European musical styles. So when foreign students come to Berklee, I think it is important to educate them in a true form of American music." The choir has served as a catalyst for some premiere voices in the music industry such as Paula Cole ‘90, Lalah Hathaway ‘90, Susan Tedeschi '91, Claude Kelly ‘02, Rob Lewis ‘86 and Mark Whitfield ‘87.

== Discography ==
- 2003: Come And Have Church With Me
