= Tedeschi Trucks Band =

American musical group

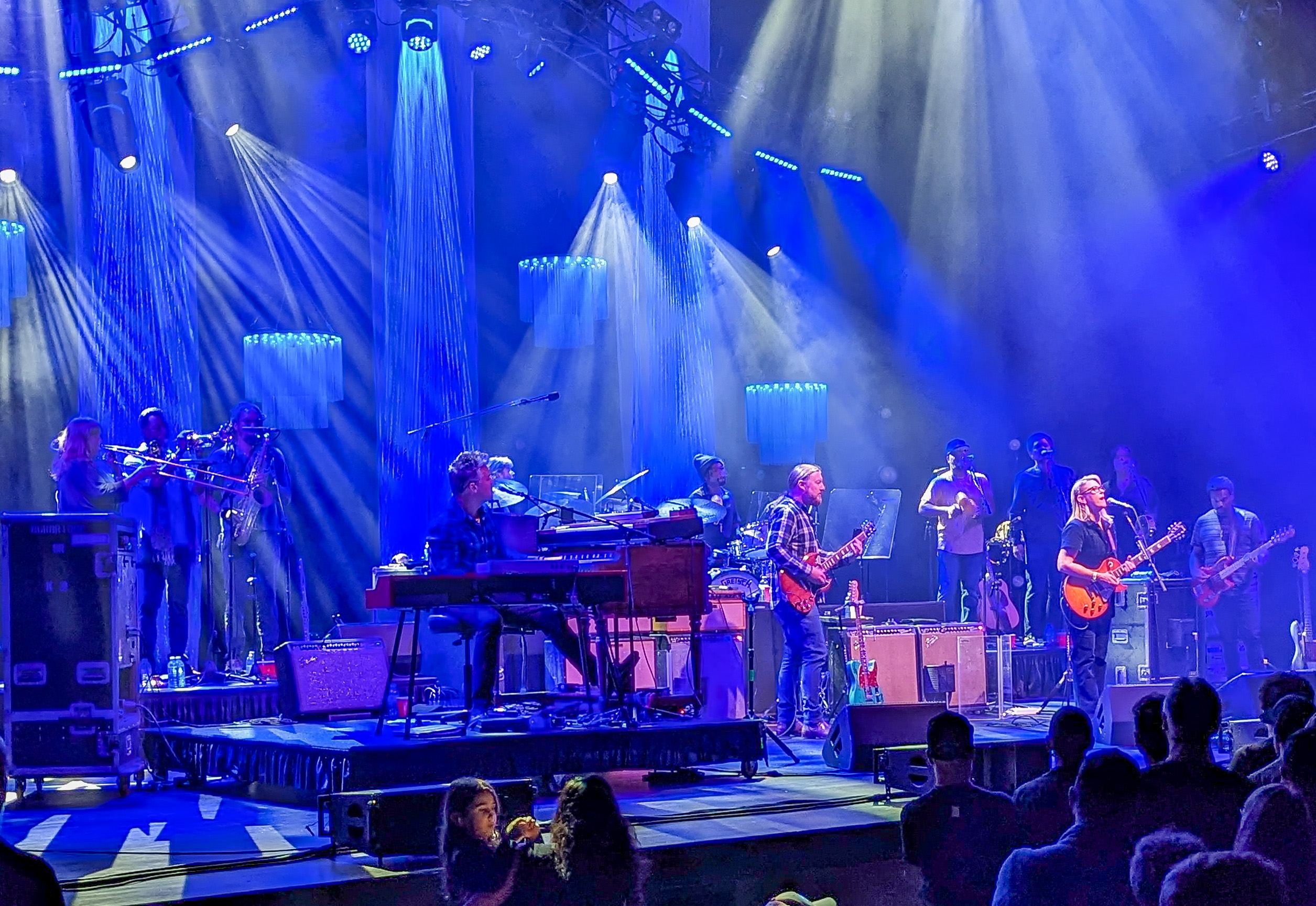
- Tedeschi Trucks band in May 2024

Background information
- Origin: Jacksonville, Florida, United States
- Genres: Southern rock; blues; blues rock; soul; Americana; jam band
- Years active: 2010–present
- Spinoff of: The Derek Trucks Band; The Susan Tedeschi Band; Soul Stew Revival
- Members: Susan Tedeschi; Derek Trucks; Elizabeth Lea; Tyler Greenwell; Mike Mattison; Mark Rivers; Kebbi Williams; Alecia Chakour; Brandon Boone; Gabe Dixon; Isaac Eady; Emmanuel Echem
- Past members: Oteil Burbridge; Maurice "Mobetta" Brown; Saunders Sermons; Tim Lefebvre; Kofi Burbridge; J. J. Johnson; Ephraim Owens
- Website: www.tedeschitrucksband.com

The Tedeschi Trucks Band (/təˈdɛski/) is an American musical group based in Jacksonville, Florida. Formed in 2010, the band is led by married couple Susan Tedeschi and Derek Trucks. Their debut album, Revelator (2011), won the 2012 Grammy Award for Best Blues Album. The band has released six studio and three live albums.

== History ==
After touring together in 2007 as the Derek Trucks & Susan Tedeschi's Soul Stew Revival, the couple merged their respective groups to form the Tedeschi Trucks Band in 2010. Their first concert was on April 1, 2010, at the Savannah Music Festival.

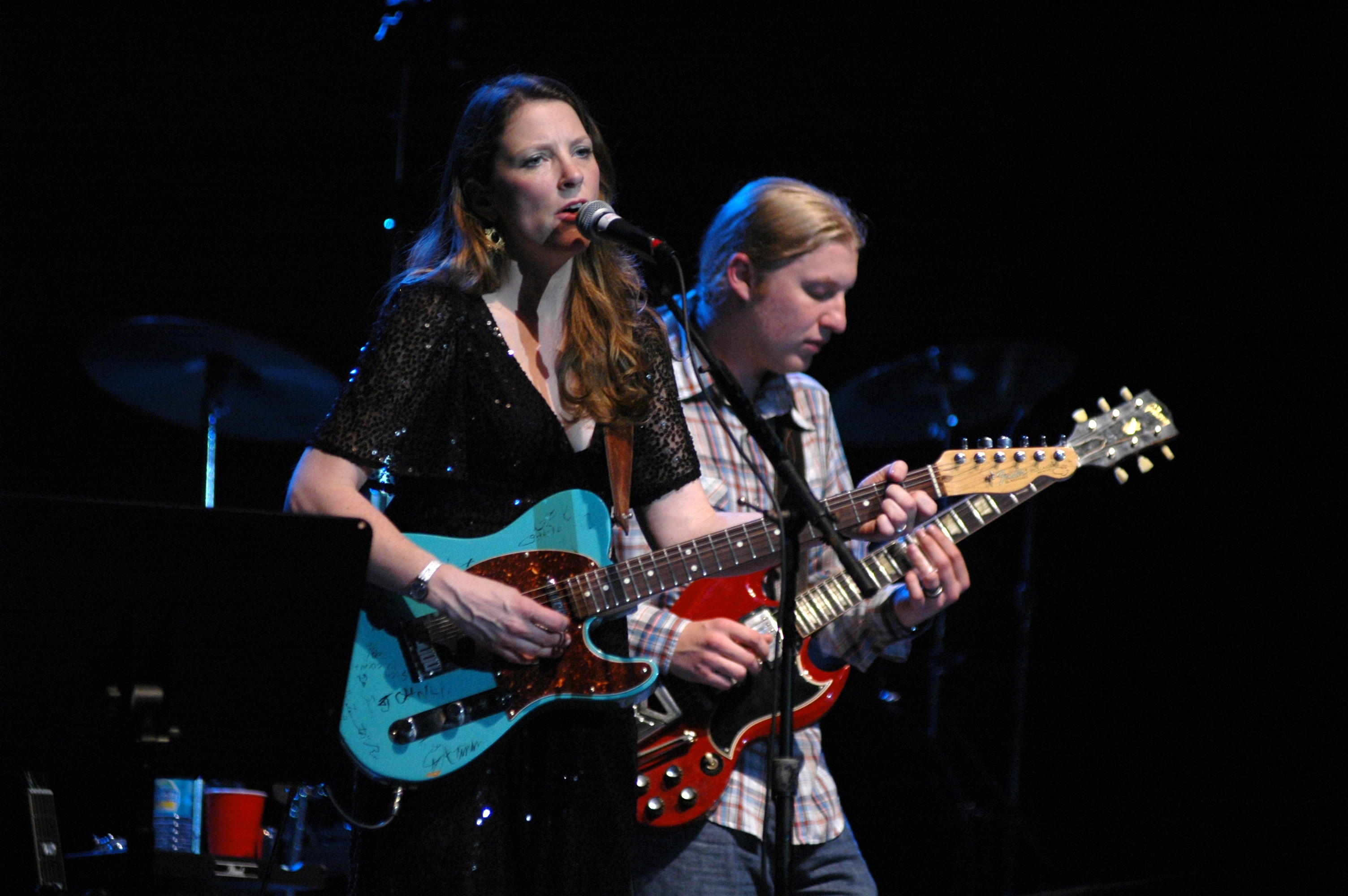
Tedeschi and Trucks performing as Soul Stew Revival in 2007

The first Tedeschi Trucks Band album, Revelator, was released on June 7, 2011. The album peaked at No. 92 on the Canadian Albums Chart, No. 164 in the UK Albums Chart and won a Grammy Award for Best Blues Album.

Their second album, Everybody's Talkin', was recorded live and released in May 2012.

In 2013, the band was nominated for the Blues Music Awards and released their third album, Made Up Mind.

At the 2015 Lockn' Festival, the band performed a tribute to Joe Cocker’s Mad Dogs and Englishmen in its entirety. The set reunited many original musicians from Cocker's 1970 tour, including Leon Russell, Rita Coolidge, Claudia Lennear, Chris Stainton, and Pamela Polland, and featured additional guests Chris Robinson, Doyle Bramhall II, Anders Osborne, John Bell, Dave Mason, and Warren Haynes. A live album of the concert was later released on September 12, 2025. Additionally, the band performed as part of a tribute to Cocker during his induction into the Rock and Roll Hall of Fame.

The band's first three albums were published by Sony Masterworks, but their 2016 album, Let Me Get By, was released on Fantasy Records. Produced by Trucks, the album debuted at number 15 on the Billboard 200 album sales chart. In 2017, Tedeschi Trucks Band released a full-length concert film and album recorded in Oakland, CA, Live from the Fox Oakland.

The fourth studio album, Signs, was released on February 15, 2019, on Fantasy/Concord Records. On January 9, 2019, the band announced tour dates through August 2019. Signs was chosen as a 'Favorite Blues Album' by AllMusic.

Layla Revisited (Live at LOCKN') was announced on May 7, 2021. The album is a one-time live recording of the Derek and the Dominos album Layla and Other Assorted Love Songs performed in full with Trey Anastasio. Recorded on August 24, 2019, at the LOCKN' Festival in Arrington, VA, the album was released on July 16, 2021.

On April 20, 2022, Tedeschi Trucks Band announced I Am the Moon, a quadruple album featuring 24 original songs which was released in four parts throughout the year, beginning with I. Crescent on June 3, II. Ascension on July 1, III. The Fall on July 29 and IV. Farewell on August 26. The album was also released as a box set containing all four parts on September 9.

The band released their sixth studio album, Future Soul, on March 20, 2026.

== Band members ==
- Susan Tedeschi – lead vocals, rhythm and lead guitar (2010–present)
- Derek Trucks – slide and lead guitar (2010–present)
- Tyler Greenwell – drums, percussion (2010–present)
- Mike Mattison – lead & harmony vocals, acoustic guitar (2010–present)
- Mark Rivers – harmony vocals (2010–present)
- Kebbi Williams – saxophone, flute (2010–present)
- Elizabeth Lea – trombone (2015–present)
- Alecia Chakour – harmony vocals (2015–present)
- Brandon Boone – bass guitar (2019–present)
- Gabe Dixon – keyboards, vocals (2019–present; touring 2018)
- Isaac Eady – drums, percussion (2021–present)
- Emmanuel Echem – trumpet (2025–present)

Former band members

- Oteil Burbridge – bass guitar (2010–2012)
- Tim Lefebvre – bass guitar (2013–2018)
- Maurice "Mobetta" Brown – trumpet (2010–2015)
- Saunders Sermons – trombone (2010–2015)
- Kofi Burbridge – keyboards, flute (2010–2019; his death)
- J.J. Johnson – drums, percussion (2010–2020)
- Ephraim Owens – trumpet (2015–2025)

Touring musicians

- Dave Monsey – bass (2012)
- Ted Pecchio – bass (2012)
- George Porter Jr. – bass (2012)
- Eric Krasno – bass (2013)
- Bakithi Kumalo – bass (2013)
- Carey Frank – keyboards (2017)
- Justin Johnson – trumpet (2024)

== Discography ==
=== Studio albums ===
Year	Album	Peak positions							Sales
Year	Album	US	AUS	ITA	NED	NOR	NZ	SWI	Sales
2011	Revelator	12	71	—	83	—	38	55	
2013	Made Up Mind	11	48	—	79	23	—	22	US: 113,000
2016	Let Me Get By	15	36	77	37	—	—	98	
2019	Signs (Note: Signs was released on the same day that the keyboardist of the band, Kofi Burbridge, died.)	28	— (Note: Signs did not enter the ARIA Albums Chart, but peaked at number 41 on the ARIA Digital Album Chart.)	—	96	—	—	20	
2022	I Am the Moon	—	—	—	—	—	—	— (Note: I Am the Moon was released as four EPs before being combined into a full album. The EPs reached number 34, 16, 14 and 14 on the Swiss charts, respectively.)	
2026	Future Soul	166	—	—	—	—	—	—	

=== Live albums ===
Year	Album	Peak positions			
Year	Album	US	AUS	NED	SWI
2012	Everybody's Talkin'	25	49	—	—
2017	Live from the Fox Oakland	39	—	73	31
2021	Layla Revisited (Live at Lockn')	47	—	88	—
2025	Mad Dogs & Englishmen Revisited (Live at Lockn') with Leon Russell	—	—	—	—

=== Archival releases ===
Year	Title
2018	Live from the Swamp, Vol. 1: Chicago Theatre, January 26, 2018
2018	Live from the Swamp, Vol. 2: Orpheum Theatre, December 3, 2016
2018	Live from the Swamp, Vol. 3: Red Rocks Amphitheatre, July 29, 2017
2018	Live from the Swamp, Vol. 4: Red Rocks Amphitheatre, July 30, 2017
2019	Beacon Bits 2019
2019	Live from the Swamp, Vol. 5: Orpheum Theatre, Los Angeles, CA, May 16, 2019
2019	Live from the Swamp, Vol. 6: Orpheum Theatre, Los Angeles, CA, May 17, 2019
2020	Live from the Swamp, Vol. 7: Warner Theatre, Washington, D.C., February 17, 2018
2021	Live from the Swamp, Vol. 8: Beacon Theatre, New York, NY, October 4, 2019
2021	Live from the Swamp, Vol. 9: Beacon Theatre, New York, NY, October 5, 2019
2022	Best of the Beacon 2021
2023	Best of Europe '22

=== EPs ===
Year	Title
2019	High and Mighty

=== Charted singles ===
Year	Title	Peak chart positions	Album
Year	Title	US AAA	Album
2016	"Anyhow"	19	Let Me Get By
2019	"Hard Case"	27	Signs

== Awards and nominations ==
Year	Association	Category	Nominated work	Result
2012	Grammy Awards	Best Blues Album	Revelator	Won
2012	Blues Music Awards	Album of the Year	Revelator	Won
2012	Blues Music Awards	Band of the Year	Tedeschi Trucks Band	Won
2013	Blues Music Awards	Blues Rock Album of the Year	Everybody's Talkin'	Won
2013	Blues Music Awards	Band of the Year	Tedeschi Trucks Band	Won
2014	Blues Music Awards	Band of the Year	Tedeschi Trucks Band	Won
2014	Blues Music Awards	Rock Blues Album of the Year	Made Up Mind	Won
2016	Americana Music Honors & Awards	Duo/Group of the Year	Tedeschi Trucks Band	Nominated
2017	Blues Music Awards	Band of the Year	Tedeschi Trucks Band	Won
2017	Blues Music Awards	Blues Rock Album of the Year	Let Me Get By	Won
2018	Grammy Awards	Best Contemporary Blues Album	Live from the Fox Oakland	Nominated
2019	Americana Music Honors & Awards	Duo/Group of the Year	Tedeschi Trucks Band	Nominated
2023	Blues Music Awards	Band of the Year	Tedeschi Trucks Band	Won
