= Annie Raines =

American musician (born 1969)

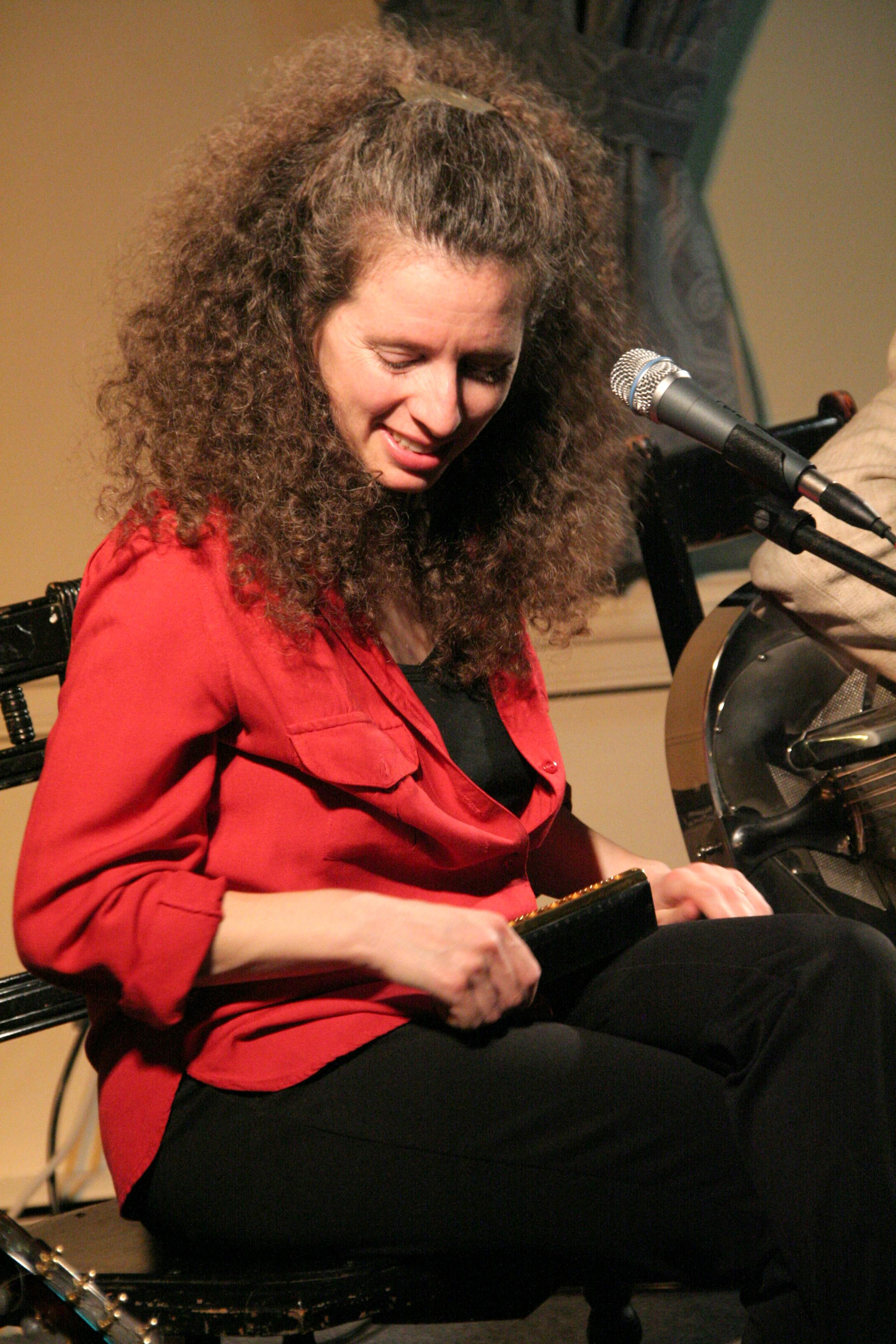
Annie Raines playing with Paul Rishell in 2008

Annie Raines (born July 3, 1969, near Boston, Massachusetts) is an American musician, best known as a harmonicist.

Raines took up the harmonica at the age of 17. As a freshman, she left Antioch College to pursue a musical career. Fascinated by the sounds of Muddy Waters, Little Walter Jacobs, and Sonny Boy Williamson, she spent time absorbing the music of the Chicago blues masters. She began to busk locally and played gigs at local Boston clubs, and later traveled to Chicago where she met and played with Pinetop Perkins, and James Cotton. While working regularly on the regional blues circuit, Raines taught harmonica and began developing her own style within the blues tradition.

She met and began working with Paul Rishell, who lent musical support to her harmonica, piano, singing and songwriting skills. This gave her the opportunity to study country blues innovators such as Noah Lewis and Sonny Terry, and, more recently, to take up the mandolin.
