= Grammy Award for Best Blues Album =

Former category of the American Grammy Award (2012–2016)

- Awarded for: quality vocal or instrumental blues albums
- Country: United States
- Presented by: National Academy of Recording Arts and Sciences
- First award: 2012
- Final award: 2016
- Website: Grammy.com

The Grammy Award for Best Blues Album was an award presented at the Grammy Awards, a ceremony that was established in 1958 and originally called the Gramophone Awards, to recording artists for releasing albums in the blues genre. Honors in several categories are presented at the ceremony annually by the National Academy of Recording Arts and Sciences of the United States to "honor artistic achievement, technical proficiency and overall excellence in the recording industry, without regard to album sales or chart position".

According to the 54th Grammy Awards guideline the category was "for albums containing at least 51% playing time of new vocal or instrumental blues recordings".

This award combined the previous categories for Best Contemporary Blues Album and Best Traditional Blues Album, which both existed between 1983 and 2011. The Recording Academy decided to create this new category for 2012 upon stating there were "challenges in distinguishing between... Contemporary and Traditional Blues".

In 2017, the distinction between contemporary and traditional blues albums was reinstated. Both categories returned, while the Best Blues Album category was discontinued.

== Recipients ==
Year	Work	Artist
2012
2012	Revelator	Tedeschi Trucks Band
2012	Low Country Blues	Gregg Allman
2012	Man in Motion	Warren Haynes
2012	The Reflection	Keb' Mo'
2012	Roadside Attractions	Marcia Ball
2013
2013	Locked Down	Dr. John
2013	33⅓	Shemekia Copeland
2013	And Still I Rise	Heritage Blues Orchestra
2013	Bring It on Home	Joan Osborne
2013	Let It Burn	Ruthie Foster
2014
2014	Get Up!	Ben Harper with Charlie Musselwhite
2014	Cotton Mouth Man	James Cotton
2014	Down in Louisiana	Bobby Rush
2014	Remembering Little Walter	Billy Boy Arnold, Charlie Musselwhite, Mark Hummel, Sugar Ray Norcia and James Harman
2014	Seesaw	Beth Hart and Joe Bonamassa
2015
2015	Step Back	Johnny Winter
2015	Common Ground: Dave Alvin and Phil Alvin Play and Sing the Songs of Big Bill Broonzy	Dave Alvin and Phil Alvin
2015	Decisions	Bobby Rush with Blinddog Smokin'
2015	Juke Joint Chapel	Charlie Musselwhite
2015	Promise of a Brand New Day	Ruthie Foster
2016
2016	Born to Play Guitar	Buddy Guy
2016	Descendants of Hill Country	Cedric Burnside Project
2016	Muddy Waters 100	John Primer and Various Artists
2016	Outskirts of Love	Shemekia Copeland
2016	Worthy	Bettye LaVette

^{^[I]} Each year is linked to the article about the Grammy Awards held that year.

== See also ==
- List of Grammy Award categories
