= Songlines (disambiguation) =

Songlines are paths crossing the countryside in Australian mythology

Songlines or songline may also refer to:

- The Songlines, a 1987 book by Bruce Chatwin
- Songlines (magazine), a music magazine
- "Songline", a track on the album Dreamtime Return by Steve Roach
- Songlines (Karan Casey album), 1997
- Songlines (Peter Brötzmann, Fred Hopkins, and Rashied Ali album), 1994
- Songlines (The Derek Trucks Band album), 2006
  - Songlines Live, a 2006 DVD by the Derek Trucks Band
- Songlines (Alphaville video), a collection of short films by the band Alphaville
- Songlines, a film by Godfrey Reggio
- Songlines, a Canadian record label established in 1992, producing modern and avant jazz and contemporary world music
- Songline (horse), a Japanese racehorse
