= Back to the River =

Studio album by Susan Tedeschi
- Released: 28 October 2008
- Genre: Blues
- Length: 44:08
- Label: Verve Forecast
- Producer: George Drakoulias, Derek Trucks, Susan Tedeschi

Susan Tedeschi chronology
Hope and Desire (2005)	Back to the River (2008)

Back to the River is the fifth and final solo studio album by blues musician Susan Tedeschi, released October 28, 2008, on Verve Forecast.

Production was handled by Tedeschi herself and her husband Derek Trucks, with George Drakoulias co-producing all tracks except "Butterfly". Upon its debut, Back to the River received favorable reviews from music critics. The album peaked at number one on the Billboard Top Blues Albums.

== Reception ==
Professional ratings
Review scores
Source	Rating
AllMusic	4/5 stars
ConcertLiveWire.com	4/5 stars

The album earned Tedeschi a nomination for "Best Contemporary Blues Album" at the 52nd Annual Grammy Awards, her fifth Grammy nomination to date, but lost to her husband's Already Free.

In a review for AllMusic, Steve Leggett praised Tedeschi's improved songwriting and called her singing "a wonderful instrument, strong and hushed by turns," commenting: "she carries the full weight of the world's possibilities when she sings, ranging from wounded to determined, delicate to brash, always getting to the emotional center of the song."

The BBC's Angus Taylor stated that Tedeschi's "rasping, good-natured songs should hit you where you live," and remarked: "Gritty, wood smoked, and with its heart pinned in the right place on its sleeve, Back To The River is a record for singing loudly along to in the car. And if you don't do much loud singing in your car - it probably isn't for you."

Aaron Lafont of OffBeat noted that, on the album, Tedeschi "sets herself apart from her peers, sheds the fair-weather comparisons to Bonnie Raitt, and cements her place at the table... she absolutely owns this record."

Writing for All About Jazz, Bill Clifford called the album "a creative high point" in Tedeschi's career, as well as "a well-rounded CD that showcases Tedeschi's talent as a songwriter, guitarist and vocalist."

Elsewhere's Graham Reid described the recording as "a fine and challenging album," and stated that Tedeschi possesses "a voice that can drive in lead-head nails from the far corner of a stadium."

In an article for Jambands.com, Brian Robbins wrote: "Susan definitely has her own six-string voice: a cross between Jimmie Vaughan's just-enough-notes-to-get-the-job-done and a nasty funkiness that comes from somewhere deep inside the woman herself."

== Track listing ==
No.	Title	Music	Length
1.	"Talking About"	Susan Tedeschi, Doyle Bramhall II, Derek Trucks	4:21
2.	"700 Houses"	John Leventhal, Ted Pecchio, Tedeschi	4:36
3.	"Back to the River"	Tedeschi, Tony Joe White	3:55
4.	"Love Will"	Tedeschi, Trucks, Tommy Sims	3:47
5.	"Butterfly"	Tedeschi, Trucks	4:06
6.	"People"	Tedeschi, Sonya Kitchell	3:25
7.	"Learning the Hard way"	Tedeschi, Gary Louris	4:37
8.	"Revolutionize Your Soul"	Leventhal, Tedeschi	4:44
9.	"True"	William Green, Ronald Perry, Jeff Sipe, Tedeschi	3:20
10.	"There's a Break in the Road"	Allen Toussaint	3:26
11.	"Can't Sleep at Night"	Tedeschi	3:51
Total length:			44:08

Note: The vinyl edition omits "There's a Break in the Road".

== Personnel ==
- Susan Tedeschi – vocals, guitar
- Tyler Greenwell – drums, percussion
- Ted Pecchio – bass guitar
- Matt Slocum – keyboards, piano
- Dave Yoke – guitar
- Derek Trucks – guitar
- Gary Louris – guitar, background vocals
- Alex Budman – saxophone
- Rob Hardt – saxophone
- Jamie Horvorka – trumpet
- Jeremy Levy – trombone
- Kyle Newmaster – trumpet
- George Drakoulias – background vocals, percussion
- Julia Waters – background vocals
- Maxine Willard Waters – background vocals
- Brendan O'Brien – guitar
- Josh Schwartz – guitar
- Robert Walter – clavinet

== Charts ==
=== Weekly ===
Chart (2008)	Peak position
US Billboard 200	71
US Blues Albums (Billboard)	1
