= Afro Blue =

1959 single by Mongo Santamaría

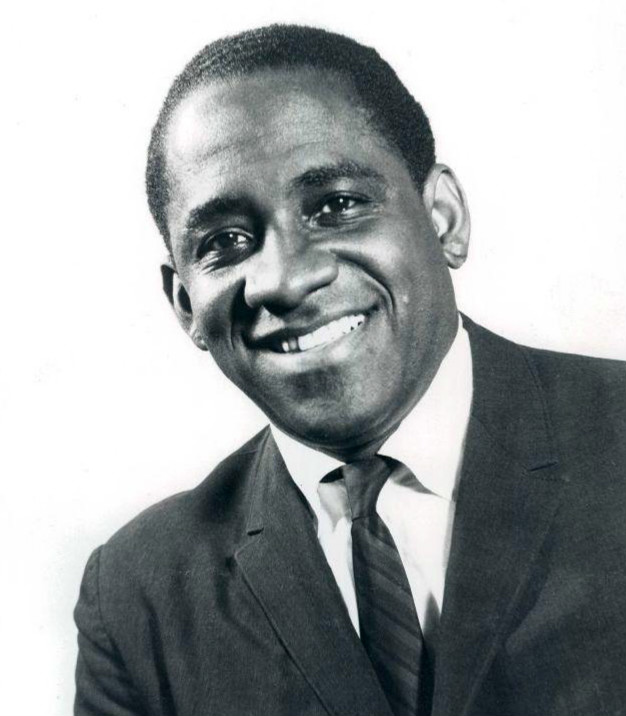
Mongo Santamaria, 1969

"Afro Blue" is a jazz standard composed by Mongo Santamaría.

== Santamaria version ==
Mongo Santamaria recorded his composition "Afro Blue" in 1959 when playing with the Cal Tjader Sextet. The first recorded performance was on April 20, 1959, at the Sunset Auditorium in Carmel, California, with Santamaría on percussion.

"Afro Blue" was the first jazz standard built on a typical African 3:2 cross-rhythm, or hemiola. The song begins with the bass repeatedly playing six cross-beats per measure of 12/8 or six cross-beats per four main beats—6:4 (two cells of 3:2). The following example shows the ostinato "Afro Blue" bass line. The cross noteheads indicate the main beats (not bass notes).

While the bass sounds the six secondary beats, Paul Horn's flute solo and Emil Richards' marimba solo emphasize the four primary beats. Francisco Aguabella takes the conga drum solo on the first recording, quoting phrases from the vocabulary of the abakuá bonkó drum.

Using brushes, Willie Bobo plays an abakuá bell pattern on a snare drum. This cross-rhythmic figure divides the twelve-pulse cycle into three sets of four pulses. Since the main beats are grouped as four sets of three pulses (dotted quarter-notes in the top example), the bell pattern significantly contradicts the meter. Bobo played this same pattern and instrumentation on the Herbie Hancock jazz-descarga "Succotash."

The harmonic structure of Santamaria's version is a simple B♭ pentatonic blues.

== Vocal version ==
In 1959 lyrics were added by songwriter Oscar Brown Jr.. Abbey Lincoln recorded it for her 1959 album Abbey Is Blue. Oscar Brown included it on his 1960 album Sin & Soul. Singers to record the standard include Dee Dee Bridgewater, Dianne Reeves, and Lizz Wright.

== Coltrane version ==
In 1963, John Coltrane recorded "Afro Blue" with Elvin Jones on drums. Jones took the opposite approach of Santamaría, superimposing two cross-beats over every measure of a 3/4 waltz (2:3). This particular swung 3/4 is perhaps the most common example of overt cross-rhythm in jazz. Coltrane and Jones reversed the metric hierarchy of Santamaria's composition, by performing in 3/4 swing (2:3), instead of 6/8 or 12/8 (3:2). Coltrane's version of "My Favorite Things", also uses a 3/4 waltz rhythm. Roberta Flack's vocal recording of "Afro Blue" (on the 2020 reissue of 1969's First Take) uses Coltrane's arrangement.

== Other notable versions ==
- The Doors - interpolated into the song "Universal Mind" on Absolutely Live (1970)
- McCoy Tyner - Song of the New World (1973)
- Dee Dee Bridgewater - Afro Blue (1974) and Red Earth (2007)
- Henri Guedon - Afro blue (1982)
- Dianne Reeves - I Remember (1991)
- Lizz Wright - Salt (2003)
- The Derek Trucks Band - Soul Serenade (2003) and Roadsongs (2010, extended live version)
- Jungle By Night - (Eponymous) (2011)
- Robert Glasper (with Erykah Badu) - Black Radio (2012)
- Melanie De Biasio - Lilies (2017)
- Roberta Flack - First Take (album) (1969, 2020 anniversary edition – bonus disc)
- Gov't Mule - Live... With a Little Help from Our Friends (1999)
