= Live from Austin, TX (Susan Tedeschi album) =

Live from Austin TX

Live album by Susan Tedeschi
- Released: 2 November 2004
- Recorded: June 17, 2003, Austin City Limits, Austin, TX
- Genre: Blues
- Length: 77:06
- Label: New West
- Producer: Gary Briggs, Cameron Strang

Susan Tedeschi chronology
Wait for Me (2002)	Live from Austin TX (2004)	Hope and Desire (2005)

Live from Austin TX is the fourth album and the first live album by American blues artist Susan Tedeschi, released in 2004.

== Reception ==
Professional ratings
Review scores
Source	Rating
AllMusic	3.5/5 stars
The Penguin Guide to Blues Recordings	2.5/4 stars
The Encyclopedia of Popular Music	4/5 stars

In a review for AllMusic, Thom Jurek called the album "a nice collection of material... performed with a wonderful balance of passion and finesse," and stated that it "doesn't replace her studio outings in any way, but it complements them nicely."

The authors of The Penguin Guide to Blues Recordings praised Tedeschi's performance of Bob Dylan's "Don't Think Twice, It's All Right", which she "claims as her own with an intimate rendition."

Hank Kalet of PopMatters described Tedeschi as "a tremendous vocal stylist" who "finds the emotional core at the center of each song and allows her voice to wrap around it."

Regarding Tedeschi's guitar work, The Washington Post's Mike Joyce stated that she "contributes a few concise and expressive solos that get the job done," although "she can always get by on vocal talent alone."

== Track listing ==
1. "You Can Make It If You Try" (Sylvester Stewart) – 2:16
2. "The Feeling Music Brings" (Kofi Burbridge, Tedeschi, Derek Trucks) – 5:20
3. "Alone" (Tommy Sims) – 3:49
4. "Wait for Me" (Felix Reyes) – 5:58
5. "Hampmotized" (Jason Crosby, Ron Perry, Jeff Sipe, Tedeschi) – 7:41
6. "Love's in Need of Love Today" (Stevie Wonder) – 4:16
7. "Don't Think Twice, It's All Right" (Bob Dylan) – 4:34
8. "Voodoo Woman" (Koko Taylor) – 5:36
9. "In the Garden" (Tommy Shannon, Tedeschi) – 3:51
10. "Gonna Move" (Paul Pena) – 4:56
11. "Wrapped in the Arms of Another" (Tedeschi) – 3:06
12. "It Hurt So Bad" (Tom Hambridge) – 6:01
13. "Lost Lover Blues" (Don Robey) – 8:24
14. "I Fell in Love" (Hambridge, Tedeschi) – 4:45
15. "Angel from Montgomery" (John Prine) – 6:33

== Personnel ==
- Susan Tedeschi - guitar, vocals
- Jason Crosby - violin, keyboards, vocals
- William Green - Hammond organ, vocals
- Ron Perry - bass, vocals
- Jeff Sipe - drums, vocals

== Production ==
- Producers: Gary Briggs, Cameron Strang
- Executive producer: Cameron Strang
- Engineer: David Hough
- Mixing: Chet Himes
- Mastering: Jerry Tubb
- Design: Katherine Delaney
- Photography: Scott Newton
- Liner notes: Terry Lickona
