= Two Years Ago =

Two Years Ago

- "Two Years Ago", a 2015 song by Ellie Goulding
- "Two Years Ago", a 1990 track by Norman Cook
- "Two Years Ago", by Nelo (band)
