= Roadsongs (The Derek Trucks Band album) =

Live album by The Derek Trucks Band
- Released: June 22, 2010
- Recorded: April 8–9, 2009
- Venue: Park West (Chicago, Illinois)
- Genre: Southern rock, jam rock, blues-rock, soul rock, jazz rock, world fusion
- Length: 105:03
- Label: Masterworks
- Producer: Derek Trucks

The Derek Trucks Band chronology
Already Free (2009)	Roadsongs (2010)

Roadsongs is the second live album by The Derek Trucks Band, released in 2010. The album features many songs off the band's most recent album, Already Free. The album was recorded over two nights in April 2009 at Chicago's Park West. For the album, The Derek Trucks Band was joined by a horn section consisting of Paul Garrett (Trumpet), Mace Hibbard (Saxophone), and Kevin Hyde (Trombone).

== Reception ==
Professional ratings
Review scores
Source	Rating
AllMusic	4/5 stars
All About Jazz	4/5 stars
Glide Magazine	3.5/5 stars
One Way Out: The Inside History of the Allman Brothers Band	3/5 stars

In a review for AllMusic, Thom Jurek stated that the album is "full of fire, grit, and jaw-dropping musical performances," and commented: "this is the most sonically satisfying live record Trucks has released to date. It's full of dynamics, beautiful separation, and warm, present sound while capturing the raw, spontaneous energy the band plays with live."

Writing for All About Jazz, Doug Collette noted that Roadsongs "accurately summarizes the evolution of The Derek Trucks Band over its sixteen-year existence," while Trucks "continues to grow as a brilliant soloist."

Randy Ray of Jambands.com called the album "another career-defining moment for the group," featuring "some of the DTB's most inspired playing." He remarked: "Continuing to defy expectations and cynical and jaded guitar-drenched ears, [Trucks] plays with a passionate fire, which is quite extraordinary, and fairly impossible to ignore."

Jason Rooks of Glide Magazine wrote: "This live recording captures the band fresh from the studio with increased energy and fluidness complete with Trucks' staggering solos and New Orleans style horn section... Roadsongs is a documented testament of The Derek Trucks Band's growth over the past 15 years."

In an article for Relix, Amy Jacques commented: "Trucks and company once again prove that they can lock into a funky groove and produce their own brand of energetic, eastern-influenced Southern rock, jazz and blues with scorching solos."

Vintage Guitar's John Heidt stated: "Part of the beauty of this band is its versatility. Funky, horn-driven soul music has become a staple of its sets... If Trucks keeps this band together for the long haul, it just may one day be seen as 'the next Allman Brothers.'"

Pete Pardo of Sea of Tranquility remarked: "It's rare that an album can grab your interest with spectacular musical/instrumental performances and at the same time have you singing along, swinging your hips and tapping your feet. Roadsongs is that CD folks, a daring musical journey that is also highly accessible and fun."

Vintage Rock's Shawn Perry wrote: "To hear DTB fire off an arsenal of their own fervent selection of originals in a mine field filled with classics melds the very core of Roadsongs and its job of spotlighting the very best from one of the very best."

== Track listing ==
=== Disc 1 ===
No.	Title	Length
1.	"I'll Find My Way" (Jay Joyce, Derek Trucks)	6:18
2.	"Down in the Flood" (Bob Dylan)	6:21
3.	"Sailing On" (Frederick "Toots" Hibbert)	5:28
4.	"Get What You Deserve" (Doyle Bramhall II, Mike Mattison, Derek Trucks)	3:58
5.	"Days Is Almost Gone" (Kofi Burbridge, Mike Mattison, Derek Trucks)	5:25
6.	"Already Free" (Mike Mattison, Derek Trucks)	5:35
7.	"Afro Blue" (Mongo Santamaria)	14:31

=== Disc 2 ===
No.	Title	Length
1.	"I Know" (Mabel Louise Smith, Jack Taylor)	6:59
2.	"Down Don't Bother Me" (Mattison, Trucks)	5:17
3.	"Don't Miss Me" (Mattison, Trucks)	5:24
4.	"Rastaman Chant" (Traditional)	11:14
5.	"Key to the Highway" (Broonzy, Segar)	6:22
6.	"Get Out of My Life, Woman/Who Knows"" (Toussaint, Hendrix)	12:44
7.	"Anyday" (Clapton, Whitlock)	9:27

== Personnel ==
Derek Trucks Band

- Derek Trucks – guitars
- Kofi Burbridge – keyboards, flute, vocals
- Todd Smallie – bass, vocals
- Yonrico Scott – drums, vocals
- Count M'Butu – percussion, vocals
- Mike Mattison – lead vocals

Horn section

- Mace Hibbard – tenor saxophone
- Kevin Hyde – trombone
- Paul Garrett – trumpet

=== Production ===
- Steve Berkowitz – executive producer
- Gregory Davidson – A&R
- Derek Trucks – producer, additional photography
- Bobby Tis – recording
- Marty Wall – recording
- Chris Shaw – mixing at If & When Studios (Brooklyn, New York)
- Dave McNair – mastering at Sterling Sound (New York, NY)
- Laura Kszan – product development
- Jennifer Liebeskind – product development
- Tammy Van Aken – packaging manager
- Josh Cheuse – art direction, design
- Aaron Formella – title submission
- René Burri – cover photography
- Michael Weintrob – back cover photography
- Charles Izenstark – additional photography
- Michael Jozwiak – additional photography
- Josh Mintz – additional photography
- Joe Roman – additional photography
- Roger Skelly – additional photography
- W.L. Matthews – additional photography
- Bobby Bolton – coach operator

Management

- Blake Budney – management
- Mark Lowensstein – online management
- Alex Miller – general management
- Chris Trucks – merchandise
- Leslie Coleman-Smith – marketing
- Scott Farthing – marketing
- Kristen Foster – publicity
- Erica Gerard – publicity
- Wayne Forte – booking
