= Soul Serenade =

Soul Serenade is the name of several songs and albums produced by different artists, including:

- Soul Serenade (Derek Trucks album), a 2003 album by The Derek Trucks Band
- Soul Serenade (Gloria Lynne album), 1965
- Soul Serenade, a 2000 album by Gospellers
- "Soul Serenade" (King Curtis song), a 1968 jazz song by King Curtis
