= Ted Pecchio =

American bassist

- Born: Youngstown, Ohio, United States
- Occupation: Bassist
- Formerly of: Colonel Bruce Hampton and the Codetalkers

Ted Pecchio is an American bassist and currently a member of Doyle Bramhall II's touring group. Prior to that he played with Colonel Bruce Hampton and the Codetalkers and Susan Tedeschi. Pecchio was born in Youngstown, Ohio, and is the son of Daniel Pecchio, bassist for the bands Glass Harp and The Michael Stanley Band.

== Discography ==
- Now, The Codetalkers (Collard Green, 2006)
- 51 - OTT, Migraine (2007)
- 52 - Grasshopper, Migraine (2008)
- Sidewalk Caesars, Scrapomatic (Landslide, 2008)
- 142 - Ivan II - Static, Migraine (2008)
- Back to the River, Susan Tedeschi (Verve, 2008)
- 81a - Cracked, Migraine (2008)
- Already Free, The Derek Trucks Band (RCA Victor, 2009)
- 92 - Beep!, Migraine (2009)
- Never Going Back, Shemekia Copeland (Telarc, 2009)
- 112 - Echoes of Bats and Men, Migraine (2009)
- 131 - Gas Mask, Migraine (2009)
- ' 'Anyway You Love, We Know How You Feel" Chris Robinson Brotherhood
