= Nelo (band) =

American alternative rock band

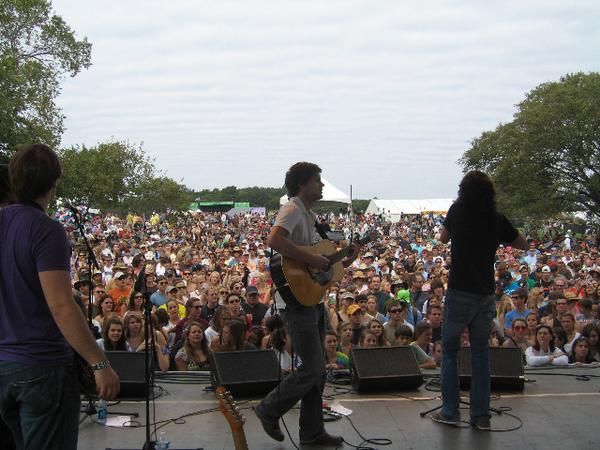
- Nelo performing at Austin City Limits Music Festival in October 2009

Background information
- Origin: Austin, Texas, U.S.
- Genre: Alternative rock
- Years active: 2005–present
- Members: Matt Ragland; Reid Umstattd; Matthew Muehling; Dave Scher; David Sierra
- Website: Official webpage

Nelo is an alternative rock band formed in Austin, Texas, United States in 2005. The band is composed of primary songwriter/ guitarist Matt Ragland, singer Reid Umstattd, keyboardist/saxophonist Brian Donohoe, guitarist Matt Muehling, and drummer David Sierra.

== History ==
Nelo was officially formed in 2005, but Ragland, Hill, Long, and Goodson started playing casually together years before in Dallas, Texas, where they attended the same high school. During these years, Ragland began writing songs and found an unsuspected singer in Umstattd, a long time friend at a summer camp in Burnet, Texas. Ragland and Umstattd became college roommates and started playing around Austin as an acoustic duo. After graduating college, Ragland brought the entire group together, with the addition of Mike St. Clair on bass. Upon the formation of the band in September 2005, Nelo immediately moved to Athens, Georgia and began playing at DT's Down Under, an underground bar that Ragland would later manage. The band moved on to regularly play other local venues including the 40 Watt Club and the Georgia Theatre.

In the spring of 2007, the group moved back to Texas to begin work on what would become their self-titled debut album in Austin. Recorded at Willie Nelson’s Pedernales Studios and released on Justice Records, Nelo was composed of songs written largely by Ragland and road tested over the previous years in Texas, Athens and across the Southeast. In April 2008 the record debuted at No. 21 on Billboard's Top Heatseekers Chart. The band spent the year touring to support the album.

The band returned to Pedernales Studios in December 2008 to record Two Years Ago, an EP. produced by Doug Lancio. The band and original member David Long parted ways at the end of 2008.

Nelo began touring in January 2009 in support of Two Years Ago, which was released by Justice Records one song at a time on iTunes beginning in March and ending as a completed E.P. on July 14. The E.P. was made available exclusively online and at live shows.

In March 2009, Nelo played the SXSW Music Conference in Austin for the second time and added saxophonist Brian Donohoe to the band. Nelo performed at Austin City Limits Music Festival on October 2, 2009. Soon after, the band and former members Chris Hill, Mike St.Clair and Stephen Goodson went their separate ways. The band released their second record, "Ordinary Scene", in October 2010 and supported it with shows across Texas and the southeast. "Ordinary Scene" was produced by Matt Ragland and mixed by C.J. Eiriksson (U2, Steve Lillywhite). "Ordinary Scene" debuted at No. 6 on the iTunes Rock Charts.

In March 2011, Nelo again played the SXSW music festival at Lustre Pearl in Austin. In late 2011, Nelo recorded an impromptu live session at Willie Nelson's Pedernales Studio just outside Austin. The band filmed the project and released the videos in anticipation of "Old Friends... (Live at Pedernales Studio", released on February 28, 2012. In the spring of 2012, Nelo started work on a new record with all new songs written by Ragland over the previous year.

Working with multiple mixing engineers on the project caused the release date to be pushed back numerous times. In the end Ragland co-mixed the album himself. On February 4, 2014 the new self-titled album debuted at No. 18 on the iTunes Rock Charts.

In mid 2017, Nelo released their first live acoustic album entitled "Roots (Live)", featuring two recorded shows performed by Matt and Reid as a duo. The first night was taped at the Listening Room in Austin, TX and the second night was taped as part of a songwriter's showcase in a church on campus at the University of Texas.

== Band members ==
Current members

- Matt Ragland – primary songwriter, guitar, piano and vocals (2005–present)
- Reid Umstattd – lead vocals (2005–2014)
- Brian Donohoe – keyboard, saxophone (2009–2014)
- Matt Muehling – guitar (2011–2014)
- Dave Sierra – drums (2012–2014)
- Dave Scher – bass, guitar (2014–2014)

Former members

- David Long – saxophone (2005–2008)
- Chris Hill – drums (2005–2009)
- Mike St. Clair – bass guitar (2005–2009)
- Stephen Goodson – guitar (2005–2009)
- Phil Aelony – guitar (2009–2010)
- Steve Pruitt – drums (2009–2010)
- Sean Jacobi – bass guitar (2009–2011)
- Ryan Jacobi – drums (2010–2011)

== Discography ==
- Nelo (2008)
- Two Years Ago EP (2009)
- Ordinary Scene (2010)
- Old Friends... (Live at Pedernales Studio) (2012)
- Nelo (2014)
- Roots (Live) (2017)
