= Here and Gone =

Studio album by David Sanborn
- Released: June 4, 2008
- Studio: Legacy Recording Studios and Hiatus Studios (New York City, New York); Studio 835 (Los Angeles, California)
- Genre: Jazz
- Length: 41:59
- Label: Decca
- Producer: Phil Ramone

David Sanborn chronology
Dreaming Girl (2008)	Here and Gone (2008)	Only Everything (2010)

Here and Gone is an album by David Sanborn released in 2008 on Decca Records. It features guest stars such as Derek Trucks, Eric Clapton, Joss Stone and Sam Moore.

== Track listing ==
1. "St. Louis Blues" (W.C. Handy) - 5:19
2. "Brother Ray" (Marcus Miller) - 5:39; featuring Derek Trucks
3. "I'm Gonna Move to the Outskirts of Town" (Casey Bill Weldon, Roy Jordan) - 4:47; featuring Eric Clapton
4. "Basin Street Blues" (Spencer Williams) - 4:54
5. "Stoney Lonesome" (Hank Crawford) - 4:08
6. "I Believe to My Soul" (Ray Charles) - 4:30; featuring Joss Stone
7. "What Will I Tell My Heart?" (Irving Gordon, Jack Lawrence, Peter Tinturin) - 4:47
8. "Please Send Me Someone to Love" (Percy Mayfield) - 3:21
9. "I've Got News for You" (Roy Alfred) - 4:27; featuring Sam Moore

== Personnel ==
- David Sanborn – alto saxophone
- Gil Goldstein – Rhodes electric piano (1, 4, 6, 8), Wurlitzer electric piano (2), Hammond B3 organ (3)
- Ricky Peterson – Hammond B3 organ (2, 6, 8, 9)
- Russell Malone – guitars
- Derek Trucks – guitars (2)
- Eric Clapton – guitars (3), vocals (3)
- Christian McBride – bass
- Steve Gadd – drums
- Howard Johnson – baritone saxophone
- Lou Marini – tenor saxophone
- Michael Davis – tenor trombone
- Keyon Harrold – trumpet
- Wallace Roney – trumpet (1)
- Lew Soloff – trumpet (1, 4, 6, 9)
- Charles Pillow – bass clarinet (1–4, 6, 9)
- John Moses – bass clarinet (5, 7, 8)
- Joss Stone – vocals (6)
- Sam Moore – vocals (9)

=== Production ===
- Dave Novik – A&R
- Phil Ramone – producer
- Joe Ferla – recording, mixing
- Lawrence Manchester – additional engineer
- Michael C. Ross – additional engineer
- Bobby Tis – additional engineer
- Missy Webb – mix assistant
- Dean Sharenow – Pro Tools programming and engineer
- Hyomin Kang – Pro Tools operator
- Steve Rodby – additional Pro Tools engineer
- Greg Calbi – mastering at Sterling Sound (New York City, New York)
- Evelyn Morgan – A&R administration
- Paul Altomari – A&R coordinator
- Jill Dell'Abate – production manager, music contractor
- Tom Arndt – package coordination
- Leif Covington – package coordination
- Garrett Shelton – release coordination
- Fanny Gotschall – creative direction
- Rebecca Meek – design
- Joanne Savio – photography
- Lynn Goldsmith – back and cover inlay photography
- Sofia Garcia – stylist
