= Already Free =

Studio album by The Derek Trucks Band
- Released: January 13, 2009
- Recorded: 2008
- Studio: Swamp Raga Studios (Jacksonville, Florida); Bakos Amp Works (Atlanta, Georgia); Electric Lady Studios (New York City, New York)
- Genre: Southern rock, blues rock, soul, rock, jam rock
- Length: 55:13
- Label: Legacy Recordings, Columbia Records
- Producer: Derek Trucks; Doyle Bramhall II

The Derek Trucks Band chronology
| Songlines (2006) | Already Free (2009) | Roadsongs (2010) |

Already Free is the sixth and final studio album by The Derek Trucks Band. It was released in the United States on January 13, 2009, by Legacy Recordings. A European release followed on February 20, 2009. The album has received very positive reviews, and debuted at #19 on the Billboard Top 200 reached #1 on the blues chart, #1 on the Internet chart, and #4 on the Rock chart. This marks the band's highest debut on the Billboard Top 200 chart to date. The album won the 2010 Grammy Award for Best Contemporary Blues Album, marking the band's first Grammy award.

The first single, "Down in the Flood", was released on November 4, 2008. Guest musicians include Doyle Bramhall II, Oteil Burbridge, Susan Tedeschi, and Eric Krasno (of Soulive). The song "Back Where I Started" was co-written by Trucks with fellow Allman Brothers Band guitarist Warren Haynes.

== Trucks' thoughts on the album ==
Derek Trucks was interviewed by The Washington Post upon the release of Already Free. The interviewer commented that in comparison to past albums by The Derek Trucks Band, this record reflects a more mature sound. Trucks himself responded by commenting that the album has a different feeling because in the past he always felt pressure to make a "guitar album". The difference, he maintains, is that the band has had more time to mature, and the album's sound is more balanced between the different contributions of its members, who developed its overall effect as they arranged the songs that were recorded for this album.

== Reception ==
Professional ratings
Review scores
| Source | Rating |
|---|---|
| AllMusic | 4/5 stars |
| PopMatters | 9/10 stars |
| Entertainment Weekly | B+ |
| Rolling Stone | 3.5/5 stars |
| One Way Out: The Inside History of the Allman Brothers Band | 4/5 stars |
| Glide Magazine | 4/5 stars |
| Daily Vault | A− |

In a review for AllMusic, Thom Jurek wrote: "There is a homegrown organic looseness to these proceedings that sets the album apart from all of Trucks' previous offerings... Its careful attention to feel creates a vibe that is altogether missing from the vast majority of recordings made in the last 30 years, yet it sounds timeless... because of the expert, tasteful nature of the playing and recording."

C. T. Heaney of PopMatters called the album Trucks' "best effort to date," and stated: "Forget the blues; forget genre, at all — Trucks and his crack band are serving up some of the best American music to be had in a fragmented, subgenre-obsessed popular music world."

Glide Magazine's Doug Collette commented: "Trucks' memorable presence, as player and producer, will ultimately compel repeated playings of Already Free. The humility that allows him to be integrated within the band is in direct proportion to the singularity of his individual skills."

Writing for OffBeat, Aaron Lafont described the album as "an intricate, well-conceived affair" with "impeccable production," and noted that Trucks' "ability to explore, seek out, and direct his vision speaks volumes about his growth as a bandleader."

In an article for Classic Rock History, Richard Lipner stated that the "mix of musical styles showcases an even tighter band who are at home as much with straight-ahead soul and funk, as they are with their brilliant more improvisational playing."

MLive's John Sinkevics noted that "It's so rare these days... to hear the kind of organically soulful, bluesy, Southern rock-infused music that Trucks and his commandingly sweet band churn out," and wrote that the album "pays tribute to a host of influential American musicians and artists, from blues to Southern rock, while blazing a trail of its own."

Jason Warburg of Daily Vault remarked: "Whether its distinctively earthy, back-porch-jam vibe fits your personal taste or not, you should take the time to try to understand -- this is what great music sounds like."

Writing for VintageRock.com, Shawn Perry commented: "Spread out on a bed of blues, soul, gospel, jazz and southern-flavored rock, the songs on Already Free are interconnected and part of a bigger tapestry, a mural of colors and pastels for the ears... thanks should go to The Derek Trucks Band for keeping the spirit and imagination of roots music alive and cooking for friends and family everywhere."

== Track listing ==
1. "Down in the Flood" (Bob Dylan) – 5:02
2. "Something to Make You Happy" (Paul Pena) – 5:01
3. "Maybe This Time" (featuring Doyle Bramhall II) (Derek Trucks, Doyle Bramhall II) – 5:03
4. "Sweet Inspiration" (Spooner Oldham, Dan Penn) – 4:38
5. "Don't Miss Me" (Trucks, Mike Mattison) – 4:16
6. "Get What You Deserve" (Trucks, Mike Mattison, Doyle Bramhall II) – 3:33
7. "Our Love" (featuring Doyle Bramhall II) (Doyle Bramhall II, Trucks) – 5:18
8. "Down Don't Bother Me" (Mike Mattison, Trucks) – 5:07
9. "Days Is Almost Gone" (Kofi Burbridge, Trucks, Mike Mattison) – 5:13
10. "Back Where I Started" (featuring Susan Tedeschi) (Trucks, Warren Haynes) – 4:20
11. "I Know" (Smith, Taylor) – 4:40
12. "Already Free" (Trucks, Mike Mattison) – 2:46

== Bonus tracks ==
Best Buy has an exclusive edition with three bonus tracks:

13. "Ballad of the Chicken Robber" (Trucks/Mattison) - 1:55
14. "Swamp Raga" (Trucks) - 6:31
15. "Long Time Man" (trad.) - 5:24

iTunes includes a bonus track with the purchase of the album:

13. "Goin' Home" (Trucks/Mattison) - 3:14

== Personnel ==
The Derek Trucks Band

- Derek Trucks – acoustic guitar (1, 7, 10–12), electric guitar (1, 7, 11, 12), bass (1), guitars (2–6, 8, 9), drums (4), vocals (6), sarod (10)
- Mike Mattison – lead vocals (1, 2, 4–6, 8, 9, 11, 12), backing vocals (1, 2, 4–6, 8, 9, 11, 12), acoustic guitar (5)
- Kofi Burbridge – acoustic piano (1, 7), Wurlitzer electric piano (1, 8, 9, 11), Hammond B3 organ (1–5, 7–9, 11), clavinet (1–3), vocals (4, 6, 8, 9), Moog bass (7)
- Todd Smallie – bass (2, 4, 8, 9, 11), vocals (4, 6, 8, 9)
- Yonrico Scott – drums (1, 2, 6–9, 11), percussion (1, 2, 4, 7, 8), vocals (4, 8, 9)
- Count M'Butu – percussion (1, 2, 6–9, 11), vocals (6, 9)

Additional musicians

- Mace Hibbard – tenor saxophone (1, 7, 9, 11)
- Kevin Hyde – trombone (1, 7, 9, 11)
- Paul Garrett – trumpet (1, 7, 9, 11)
- Doyle Bramhall II – electric guitar (2), backing vocals (2, 3, 7), lead vocals (3, 7), guitars (6), vocals (6), acoustic guitar (7)
- Eric Krasno – guitars (3)
- Ted Pecchio – bass (3, 5, 10)
- Oteil Burbridge – bass (7)
- Tyler Greenwell – drums (3, 5, 7), percussion (7, 10)
- Bobby Tis – percussion (12)
- Duane Trucks – percussion (12)
- Susan Tedeschi – backing vocals (4), vocals (8), lead vocals (10)

== Production ==
- Steve Berkowitz – A&R
- Derek Trucks – producer, recording, photography
- Doyle Bramhall II – co-producer (2, 3, 6, 7)
- Chris Shaw – recording, mixing
- Bobby Tis – recording
- Marty Wall – recording
- Jeff Bakos – horn recording (1, 7, 9, 11)
- Noah Goldstein – mix assistant
- Paul Suarez – mix assistant
- George Marino – mastering at Sterling Sound (New York, NY)
- Leslie Collman-Smith – project direction
- Adam Farber – project direction
- Tony Ward – project direction
- Josh Cheuse – art direction, design, cover photography
- Michael Schmelling – photography
- Blake Budney – additional photography, management for Milestone Music Management
- Joe Roman – additional photography
- Erica Trucks – additional photography
- Vincent Tseng – additional photography
- Ashley Kahn – liner notes
- John Snyder – liner notes

Crew

- Bobby Bolton – coach operator
- Chris Trucks – merchandise manager
- Bobby Tis – guitar technician, stage monitor technician
- Marty Wall – live sound engineer
