= The Derek Trucks Band (album) =

Studio album by the Derek Trucks Band
- Released: October 7, 1997 (CD); November 17, 2008 (Digital download)
- Recorded: September 30, October 1–4, 1996
- Studio: Dockside Studios (Maurice, Louisiana)
- Genre: Blues, jazz fusion, jam rock, Southern rock
- Length: 52:13
- Label: Landslide
- Producer: John Snyder

The Derek Trucks Band chronology
The Derek Trucks Band (1997)	Out of the Madness (1998)

The Derek Trucks Band (often called simply, Derek Trucks) is the debut album by American Jazz/Blues/R&B group the Derek Trucks Band, released on October 7, 1997. The album was recorded between September 30 and October 4, 1996, at Dockside Studios in Maurice, Louisiana. The album is composed mainly of re-arranged jazz and blues classics and the rest are original compositions by the band. Derek was seventeen years old at the time of the release of the album. In 2008, the album was made available digitally.

== Reception ==
Professional ratings
Review scores
Source	Rating
AllMusic	3.5/5 stars
Jambands: The Complete Guide to the Players, Music, & Scene	3.5/5 stars
One Way Out: The Inside History of the Allman Brothers Band	3.5/5 stars

In a review for AllMusic, Michael B. Smith called the album "a flawless recording," and described the band as "a group of tight-knit, talented musicians." He stated that Trucks "blazes through new arrangements of jazz and blues classics," and commented: "He turns the trumpet wizardry of Miles Davis into slide-guitar magic, and his readings of a couple of Coltrane tunes pack a terrific punch."

Writer Dean Budnick noted that the selection of tunes "provides the listener with a taste of each band member's considerable gifts," and also "demonstrates the group's affinity for jazz."

Bill Milkowski of JazzTimes praised Trucks' "monstrous slide guitar chops," and remarked: "Not many slide guitarists would bother to tackle material like John Coltrane's 'Mr. P.C.' and 'Naima,' Miles Davis' 'So What' or Wayne Shorter's 'Footprints,' but Trucks stretches on these jazzy vehicles with ferocious conviction."

Reviewer George Graham wrote: "Trucks still has the teenager's chutzpah that would lead him to attempt John Coltrane and Miles Davis on a slide guitar, but he already has enough experience and taste to make it come off remarkably well. The result is a very satisfying album with some impressive musicianship, and perhaps a surprise or two."

Author Alan Paul noted that the album "announced loud and clear that Trucks was not your average teenaged guitar whiz."

== Track listing ==
No.	Title	Writer(s)	Length
1.	"Sarod"	Derek Trucks	0:35
2.	"Mr. P.C."	John Coltrane	5:30
3.	"555 Lake"	lyrics: Bill McKay; music: Yonrico Scott, Todd Smallie, Trucks	6:33
4.	"D Minor Blues"	Larry Oakes, Trucks	6:01
5.	"#6 Dance"	Oakes, Trucks	2:39
6.	"Footprints"	Wayne Shorter	4:19
7.	"Out of Madness"	Scott, Smallie, Trucks	4:09
8.	"Naima"	John Coltrane	4:59
9.	"So What"	Miles Davis	4:37
10.	"Evil Clown"	McKay, Scott, Smallie, Trucks	4:30
11.	"Egg 15"	Ron Roper, Smallie, Trucks	7:40
12.	"Sarod Outro"	Trucks	0:41

== Personnel ==
Derek Trucks Band

- Derek Trucks – guitars, sarod
- Bill McKay – Roland electric piano, Wurlitzer electric piano, Hammond B3 organ, synthesizers, clavinet, vocals (3)
- Todd Smallie – six-string bass
- Yonrico Scott – drums, timpani, congas, shakers, tambourine, maracas, cabasa, chimes

Additional personnel

- Gary Gazaway – trumpet (3, 6), flugelhorn (3, 6)

=== Production ===
- John Snyder – producer
- Tony Daigle – engineer, mastering
- Johnny Sandlin – mixing
- Benny Graeff – assistant engineer, mix assistant
- James Flournoy Holmes – design, photography
