= Georgia Theatre =

Live music venue and event space in Athens, Georgia, USA

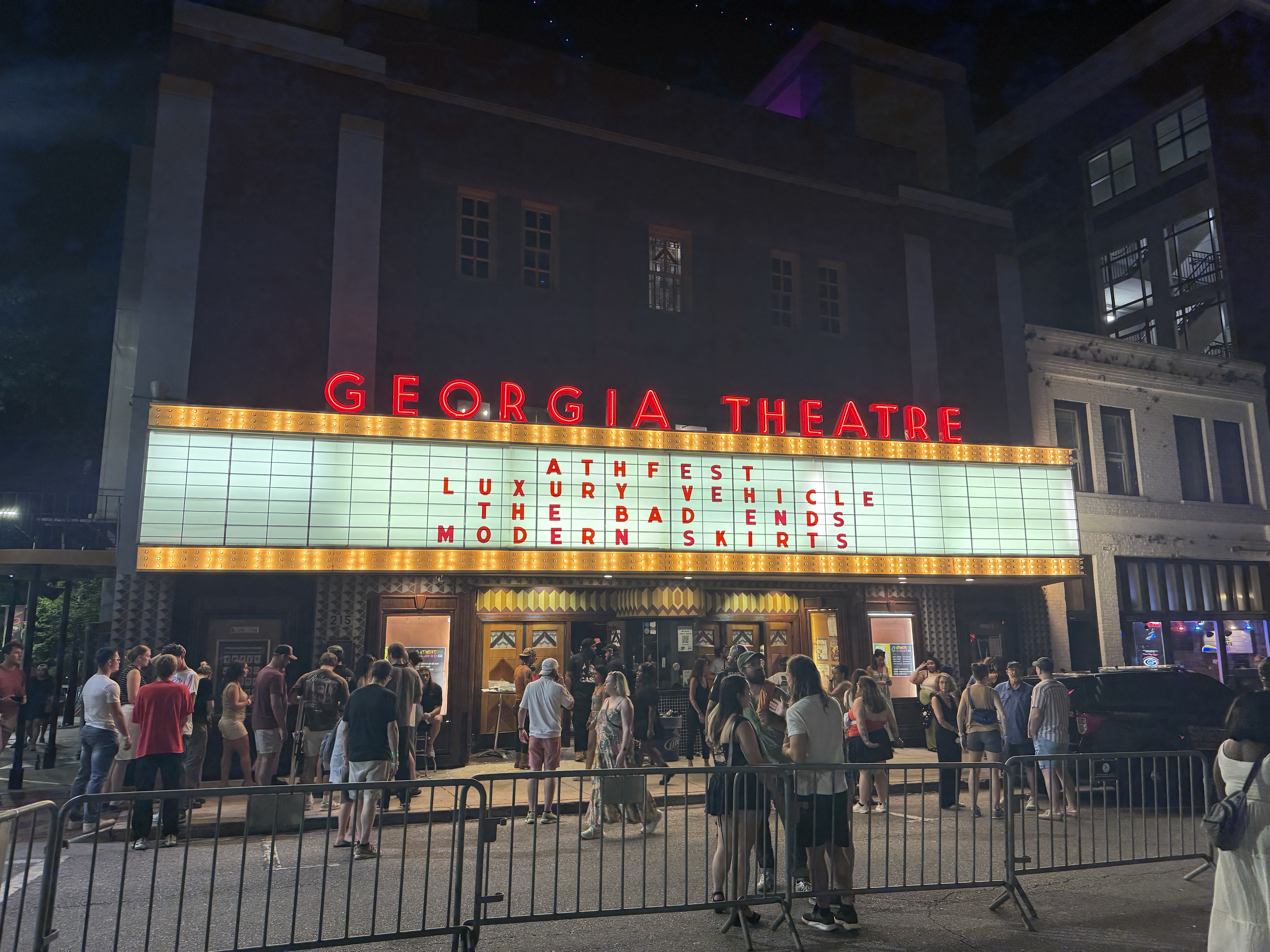
- Interactive map of Georgia Theatre
- Address: 215 N. Lumpkin Street; Athens, Georgia; United States
- Capacity: 1028
- Current use: Live Music Venue

Website
- www.georgiatheatre.com

Georgia Theatre is a live music venue and event space in Athens, Georgia. National and local acts across all genres have performed at the theatre, including rock, folk, country, indie, alternative, hip hop and electronic. The venue is on the Athens Music History Walking Tour sponsored by the Athens Convention and Visitors Bureau. Georgia Theatre opened as a music venue in 1978, but spent a few years in the early 1980s operating sporadically as a movie house. It was reopened as a music venue in 1989 and has since hosted many of the major touring acts that come through the state.

== History ==
In 1889, the YMCA of Athens bought the property on which Georgia Theatre now stands and built a building on the site. In its earliest days, this YMCA building served as home to the Georgia Bulldogs basketball team, from 1905 to 1911. Starting in 1913, a music store occupied the bottom floor while the YMCA continued to use the second and third floor. In 1926, the Masonic Temple Association of Athens bought the building and soon began sharing the space with Dorsey Furniture Co. In 1935, the Elite Theater opened in the location, building upon and expanding the foundation of YMCA building.

After many different uses over the years, in 1977 Sam Smartt, Hap Harris, George Fontaine and Sheffy McArthur converted the building into a concert hall. The B-52s paid to perform at Georgia Theatre on May 20, 1978, and the following year The Police played as part of the band's first U.S. tour.

Georgia Theatre briefly closed in 1981 and was reopened a year later by Carafe & Draft Theater as a movie house. Kyle Pilgrim and Bill "Duck" Anderson bought the building in 1989, planning to reopen Georgia Theatre as concert venue. Pylon performed the first show at the new Georgia Theatre, and in subsequent years the venue hosted Athens band Widespread Panic, Beck, Warren Zevon, J.J. Cale, David Byrne, Black Lips, Umphreys McGee, Dave Matthews Band, and members of R.E.M., among countless other acts of both national and international importance. The 2004 album Live at Georgia Theatre by Derek Trucks Band was recorded at the venue, as well as the video for John Mayer's 2002 song “No Such Thing”. In November 2004, Georgia Theatre was sold to Wilmot Greene who renovated and restored the building. In 2014, the venue was sold to Agon, who also owns Variety Playhouse in Atlanta, GA.

== Fire and renovation ==
On the morning of June 19, 2009, a major fire erupted in Georgia Theatre, causing severe damage to the building and collapsing the roof. The venue underwent renovations in 2010 and 2011 and reopened on August 1, 2011. Funding for the restoration came in part from ticket sales of a benefit concert hosted by Zac Brown Band and several guest artists at the Fox Theatre in downtown Atlanta. The concert was later released as a three-disk album titled Pass the Jar: Zac Brown Band and Friends Live from the Fabulous Fox Theatre In Atlanta. The fire and history of Georgia Theatre were recorded in a documentary film called Athens Burning (2012).

Since reopening, the venue has hosted acts including My Morning Jacket, Gregg Allman, Alabama Shakes, Willie Nelson, Basketball Team, Run The Jewels, and Kenny Chesney.
