= Out of the Madness =

Studio album by The Derek Trucks Band
- Released: October 20, 1998 (CD); November 17, 2008 (Digital download)
- Recorded: June 14, 1997–April 11, 1998
- Studios: Dockside Studios (Maurice, Louisiana); BMG Studios and Sound On Sound (New York City, New York)
- Genres: Blues rock, jazz fusion, jam rock, Southern rock
- Length: 63:13
- Label: House of Blues
- Producer: John Snyder

The Derek Trucks Band chronology
The Derek Trucks Band (1997)	Out of the Madness (1998)	Joyful Noise (2002)

Out of the Madness is the second studio album by American Jazz/Blues/R&B group The Derek Trucks Band, released on October 20, 1998. The album, a mix of blues classics and original compositions by the band, was recorded between June 14, 1997 and April 11, 1998 at Dockside Studios in Maurice, Louisiana. Derek was eighteen years old at the time of the release of the album. In 2008, the album was made available digitally, and is now available on iTunes, and other online retailers like Real, Rhapsody, Yahoo! Music, eMusic, Napster and Puretracks.

== Reception ==
Professional ratings
Review scores
Source	Rating
AllMusic	3/5 stars
Daily Vault	B
The Music Box	3/5 stars
One Way Out: The Inside History of the Allman Brothers Band	3/5 stars

In a review for AllMusic, Cub Koda noted that, in relation to Trucks' debut album, Out of the Madness "puts his playing and music more firmly in Southern American roots music territory," with "more of a jam session feeling... than that of a cohesive album." He concluded: "All in all, a young artist still showing promise."

Geoffrey Himes of The Washington Post called Trucks "a teenage blues guitarist of undeniable virtuosity and an uncertain grasp of the blues gestalt," and stated that the album contains "respectable but workmanlike versions of familiar standards." He commented: "Derek has absorbed a lot in a short time, but he still has a ways to go in matching the graceful jazz-blues-country-rock synthesis of the Allman Brothers."

OffBeat's Melissa Crory wrote: "From the opening track, 'Preachin' Blues' to the almost nine-minute scorcher, 'Kickin' Back,' Trucks' ability shines. Ain't no potential about this bluesman, he's already there."

Writing for The Music Box, John Metzger remarked: "Trucks' guitar screams with a powerful and relentless force that seems to draw from an older, wiser spirit... Though Out of the Madness is a little rough around the edges, it's an album that is full of promise."

In an article for Daily Vault, Christopher Thelen described the album as "a testament to the talent of Trucks and his band," and stated: "If you enjoy traditional blues as well as a bit of Southern rock thrown into the mix for texture, then Out Of The Madness will be a wonderful addition to your collection."

== Track listing ==
No.	Title	Writer(s)	Length
1.	"Preachin' Blues"	Son House	4:58
2.	"Younk Funk"	Jimmy Herring/Derek Trucks	4:49
3.	"Good Morning Little Schoolgirl"	Sonny Boy Williamson	5:39
4.	"Forty-Four"	Howlin' Wolf	5:38
5.	"Kickin' Back"	Herring/Jona Herbert/Oteil Burbridge	8:51
6.	"Look-Ka Py Py" (featuring Ruben Blades)	Zigaboo Modeliste/Art Neville/Leo Nocentelli/George Porter Jr.	4:07
7.	"Alright"	Herring/Ron Roper	2:48
8.	"Death Letter"	House	5:25
9.	"Pleasant Gardens"	Todd Smallie/Trucks	6:33
10.	"Spillway"	Herring	4:56
11.	"Ain't That Lovin' You"	Deadric Malone	6:37
12.	"Deltaraga"	Trucks	2:52

== Personnel ==
The Derek Trucks Band

- Derek Trucks – guitars
- Bill McKay – keyboards
- Todd Smallie – bass
- Yonrico Scott – drums, percussion

Additional personnel

- Jimmy Herring – guitars
- Warren Haynes – vocals (3, 4, 8), guitar (3, 4, 8)
- Larry McCray – vocals (11), guitar (11)
- Matt Tutor – vocals (1, 7)

=== Production ===
- John Snyder – producer
- Tony Daigle – recording (1–7, 9–11)
- Jay Newland – engineer for Warren Haynes (8), additional mixing, mastering
- Jim Watts - mixing, recording assistant (1–7, 9–11)
- Benny Graeff – recording assistant (1–7, 9–11)
- Jason Standard – assistant engineer (8)
- Flournoy Holmes – cover art, design, photography
- K. Tauches – design assistant
- Stacey Orzell – additional photography
- Blake Budney – management
