= Yonrico Scott =

American drummer and percussionist (1955–2019)

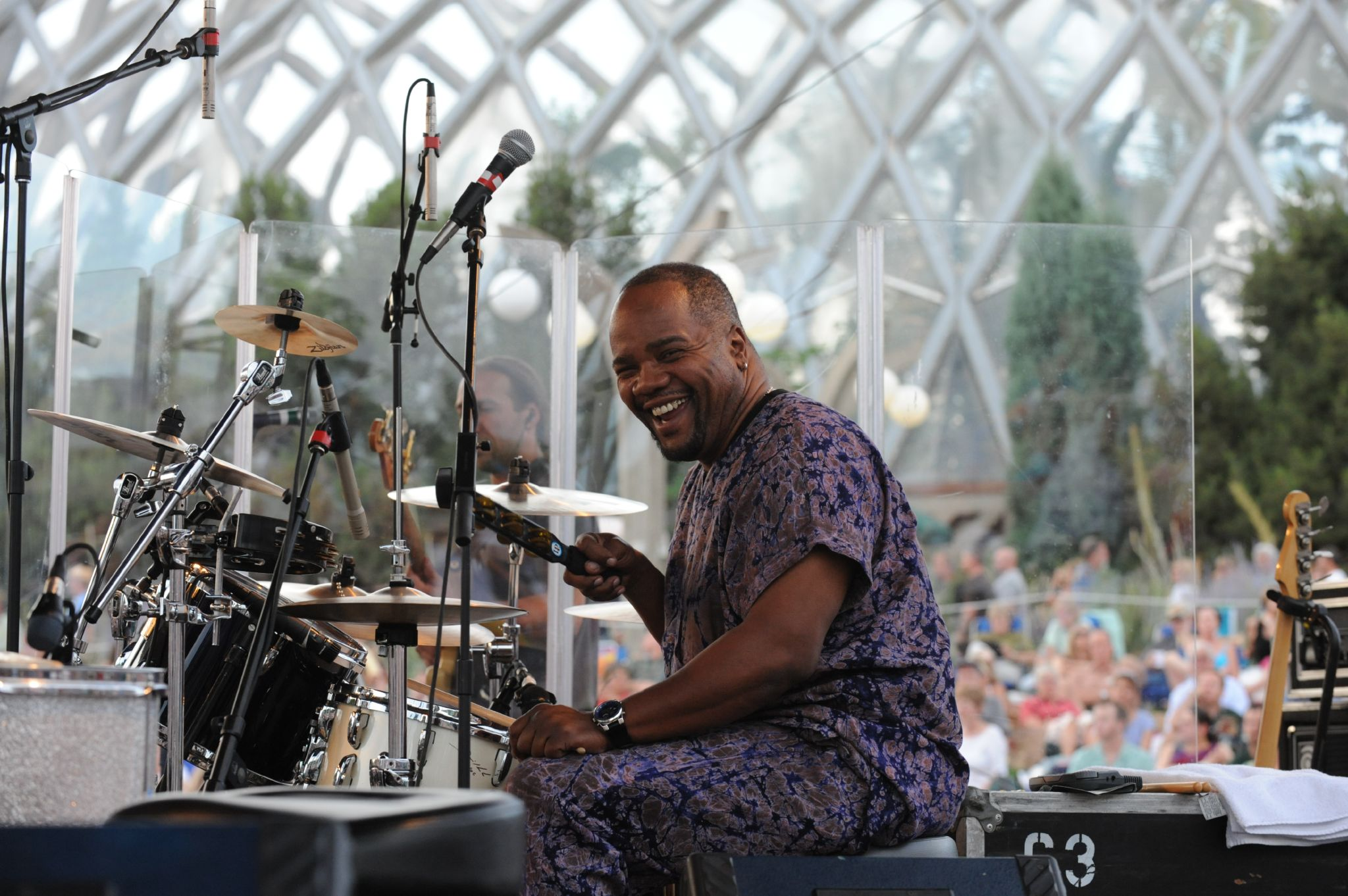
- Scott performing with the Derek Trucks Band; July 20, 2008

Background information
- Born: October 6, 1955; Detroit, Michigan, U.S.
- Died: September 19, 2019 (aged 63)
- Genres: Blues, blues rock, R&B, gospel
- Occupations: Musician, songwriter, record producer
- Instruments: Drums, tympani, conga drums, shakers, tambourine, maracas, sabasa, chimes
- Years active: 1995–2019
- Labels: Landslide Records, Legacy Recordings/Columbia Records, Sony Music, House of Blues
- Website: Yonricoscott.com

Yonrico Scott (October 6, 1955 – September 19, 2019) was an American drummer and percussionist. He was a longtime member of the Grammy winning The Derek Trucks Band, became a bandleader of his own ensemble, the Yonrico Scott Band, and later worked with the Royal Southern Brotherhood, with Cyril Neville. Having developed his craft not only from years of session work, roadwork, and study, the Cape Cod Times proclaimed him "a standout in the band... whose strong beats powered songs such as 'I'll Find My Way' off the group's Songlines CD".

== Musical career ==
=== Early years ===
Yonrico Scott was raised in Detroit, Michigan with a keen interest in music, encouraged by his family. He first showed interest in playing the drums, receiving lessons at age seven. For a period of time, while learning and practicing the drums, Scott moved on to playing gospel music, and at age fourteen had mastered all that was available in the metropolitan city the previous year, earning him a reputation as the best performer in that genre. Scott moved on and became a student Motown drummer George Hamilton, with a growing interest in R&B music in his teens. He later worked as a session musician for a large number of famous figures, including Stevie Wonder.

After high school graduation, Scott attended the University of Kentucky, where he graduated in 1978 with a Bachelor's Degree, in performance percussion. After college, Scott moved to Atlanta, Georgia. While in Atlanta, he recorded and performed with Atlanta jazz artists Joe Jennings and Howard Nicholson and their band Life Force, including on the 1981 album Fearless Warriors.

== Career ==
Scott recording at Sit-N-Spin Recording Studios

Scott joined The Derek Trucks Band in 1995. Scott was the second permanent member (after bassist Todd Smallie) of the blues rock band, which toured extensively. During the band's formative years, Trucks added two other musicians, but was unsatisfied with their contributions, but Scott remained, through a metamorphosis of both personnel and musical direction while Trucks was assembling the band's final lineup, which was complete in 2002 with the addition of Mike Mattison as vocalist, Kofi Burbridge (keyboards, flute and backing vocals), and occasional appearances by percussionist Count M'Butu, as well as Trucks himself. By 2010, Scott had contributed to the songwriting and performed on every one of the band's six studio albums and both of their live albums. In 2010, accepted the Grammy Award for Best Contemporary Blues Album for both himself and for all the other members of The Derek Trucks Band at the 52nd Grammy Awards, for their 2009 album, Already Free.

At the close of 2009, Derek Trucks dissolved the band for at least a year. Trucks' wife, Susan Tedeschi dismissed her sidemen, and joined Derek in a new project, The Tedeschi Trucks Band. Scott recorded on Tedeschi's album, Wait for Me, in 2002. He performed with Earl Klugh, and played many gigs with The Yonrico Scott Band throughout 2010.

Scott was also the studio and touring drummer for the Royal Southern Brotherhood, which toured across 27 countries in 2012–13 (according to bassist Charlie Wooton) and released their first album in late 2012, on which Scott is credited with some songwriting. He and Charlie Wooten became the backbone of a "supergroup" with Devon Allman, Cyril Neville and Mike Zito that was lauded all over the globe.

In 2015, Scott guest drummed on Jeremiah Johnson's album, Grind.

=== Artwork ===
Yonrico Scott is credited on the album Songlines for the set list illustration. The album gained its name from an Aboriginal concept that the world had been sung into existence by "totemic" elder beings who wandered the Australian continent along invisible pathways, breathing and singing the names of everything in creation. Those "songlines" became important as everything had been brought to life, and order in such a fashion. Scott's ability to represent this concept arrived both on the album cover and backdrop of the stage at the venues during The Derek Trucks Band's tour to support the album.

== Equipment ==
Scott used Pearl Drums, Zildjian sticks and cymbals, Lp Percussions, Everyones Drumming.

== Later works and death ==
Scott recorded his second solo album at Sit-N-Spin Recording Studios in Greenville, South Carolina. He died on September 19, 2019, at age 63.

== Discography ==
=== Solo ===
- Be In My World (2012)
- Quest of the Big Drum (2014)
- Only A Smile (2015)
- Life of a Dreamer (2016)

=== With The Derek Trucks Band ===
- The Derek Trucks Band (1997)
- Out of the Madness (1998)
- Joyful Noise (2002)
- Soul Serenade (2003)
- Live at Georgia Theatre (2004)
- Songlines (2006)
- Songlines Live (2006, DVD)
- Already Free (2009)
- Roadsongs (2010)

=== With Royal Southern Brotherhood ===
- Royal Southern Brotherhood (2012)
- Heartsoulblood (2014)

=== Other contributions ===
- Power (1986) (Kansas)
- A Woman's Intuition (1987) (Dardanelle)
- Half Past the Blues (1997) (Vernon Garrett)
- Live... With a Little Help from Our Friends (1998) (Gov't Mule)
- Wait for Me (2002) (Susan Tedeschi)
- Character Farm and Other Short Stories (2011) (Jonathan Scales)
- Some 1 I Used To Be (2014) (Sam Wheelock)
- Grind (2015) (Jeremiah Johnson)
- Strategy: Our Tribute to Philadelphia (2016) (The Three Degrees)
- Bad Penny (2018) (Vanja Sky)
- “Clearwater Live” (2019) (RJ Howson)
