= Wait for Me (Susan Tedeschi album) =

Studio album by Susan Tedeschi
- Released: 19 November 2002
- Genre: Blues rock
- Length: 45:30
- Label: Tone Cool
- Producer: Susan Tedeschi, Steve Berlin, Tom Dowd, Derek Trucks

Susan Tedeschi chronology
Just Won't Burn (1998)	Wait for Me (2002)	Live from Austin TX (2004)

Wait for Me is the third studio album by American blues artist Susan Tedeschi, released in 2002.

== Reception ==
Professional ratings
Review scores
Source	Rating
AllMusic	3/5 stars
The Penguin Guide to Blues Recordings	2/4 stars
The Encyclopedia of Popular Music	4/5 stars

The track titled "Alone" earned Tedeschi a nomination for "Best Female Rock Vocal Performance" at the 45th Annual Grammy Awards, while the album earned her a nomination for "Best Contemporary Blues Album" at the 46th Annual Grammy Awards.

In a review for AllMusic, Hal Horowitz wrote: "With classy yet scorching performances and songs infused with roots rock, blues, funk, and even pop, it's a crossover album that oozes with integrity, terrific playing, and a loose yet distinctive direction."

The authors of The Penguin Guide to Blues Recordings called Tedeschi's voice "flexible and soaring," but criticized the inclusion of songs that "are awash with clichés that suppress individuality."

Geoffrey Himes of The Washington Post noted that Tedeschi "possesses a powerful soprano, an appealing blues-mama persona and good taste in songwriters," and suggested that her collaboration with Derek Trucks "sound[s] so comfortable that one wishes the married couple would join forces permanently."

Writing for All About Jazz, Charlie B. Dahan stated that Tedeschi "has matured and thus as an artist she must progress. Wait For Me examines the soulful side of music and does a damn good job of it."

The Morning Call's Jodi Duckett called the album "a significant step forward," and noted that "Tedeschi has widened her musical scope considerably."

Chris Gardner of Jambands.com praised "the gritty authenticity of the music," and remarked: "The album cover suggests a woman trying hard to impress. The music within doesn't try to impress. It just does."

In an article for The Music Box, John Metzger described the album as "a welcome comeback — one that often recalls the gospel blues of Etta James mixed with the soulful folk of Van Morrison," but noted that "it still falls a bit short of what she is capable of producing."

== Track listing ==
1. "Alone" (Tommy Sims) – 4:21
2. "Gonna Move" (Paul Pena) – 4:23
3. "Wrapped in the Arms of Another" (Tedeschi) – 3:03
4. "'Til I Found You" (Tom Hambridge, Tedeschi) – 3:32
5. "Wait for Me" (Felix Reyes) – 4:47
6. "The Feeling Music Brings" (Kofi Burbridge, Tedeschi, Derek Trucks) – 7:15
7. "In the Garden" (Tommy Shannon, Tedeschi) – 3:45
8. "Hampmotized" (Jason Crosby, Ron Perry, Jeff Sipe, Tedeschi) – 3:10
9. "Don't Think Twice, It's All Right" (Bob Dylan) – 4:43
10. "I Fell in Love" (Tom Hambridge, Tedeschi) – 3:29
11. "Blues on a Holiday" (Paul Rishell) – 3:02

== Personnel ==
- Susan Tedeschi - rhythm guitar, vocals, soloist
- Paul Ahlstrand - tenor saxophone
- Scott Aruda - trumpet
- Tino Barker - tenor saxophone
- Kevin Barry - acoustic guitar, soloist
- Gordon Beadle - baritone saxophone
- Joe Bonadio - drums
- Kofi Burbridge - organ, piano
- Dean Cassell - bass
- Jason Crosby - organ, piano, violin, keyboards
- Drew Glackin - bass
- Col. Bruce Hampton - guitar
- Johnnie Johnson - piano
- Dave Mattacks - drums
- David McNair - bass, rhythm guitar
- Ron Perry - bass
- Annie Raines - harmonica
- Milt Reder - electric guitar
- Paul Rishell - guitar
- Yonrico Scott - percussion, drums
- Noah Simon - mellotron
- Jeff Sipe - drums
- Todd Smallie - bass
- Derek Trucks - guitar
- Tom West - organ

== Production ==
- Producers: Susan Tedeschi, Steve Berlin, Tom Dowd, Derek Trucks
- Executive producer: Richard Rosenblatt
- Engineers: Jeff Bakos, Nate Dube, David McNair, Noah Simon, Peter Thornton, Greg Trampe, André Zweers
- Mixing: David McNair
- Mastering: Robert Hadley
- Assistant: Joe Sullivan
- Horn arrangements: Paul Ahlstrand
- Design: Frank Olinsky

== Charts ==
Album - Billboard (North America)

Year	Chart	Position
2002	The Billboard 200	91
2002	Top Blues Albums	1
2002	Top Independent Albums	3
2002	Top Internet Albums	133
