= Hope and Desire =

Studio album by Susan Tedeschi
- Released: 11 October 2005
- Recorded: April 1–14, 2005
- Genre: Blues
- Label: Verve Forecast
- Producer: Joe Henry

Susan Tedeschi chronology
Live from Austin TX (2004)	Hope and Desire (2005)	Back to the River (2008)

Hope and Desire is the fourth studio album by Susan Tedeschi. It was released on October 11, 2005, on the Verve Forecast label. The album is a slight step away from Tedeschi's electrifying compositions and wild guitar work, as she concentrates on singing. All songs on Hope and Desire are covers of famous soul standards.

== Reception ==
Professional ratings
Review scores
Source	Rating
AllMusic	4/5 stars
ConcertLiveWire.com	3.5/5 stars
The Encyclopedia of Popular Music	3/5 stars
Twangville	4/5 stars

The album earned Tedeschi a nomination for "Best Contemporary Blues Album" at the 49th Annual Grammy Awards.

In a review for AllMusic, Thom Jurek stated that Tedeschi "digs deep into the soul and R&B fakebook for inspiration and comes out a winner." He wrote: "based on the evidence here, she can sing any damn thing she likes and move your heart, making you believe every word and wail in the grain of a song. That's as high a compliment as one can pay."

Twangville's Tom Osborne commented: "I don't care what she sings as long as she keeps making records... this album packs a wallop of soul and is outstanding from start to finish."

Mike Joyce of The Washington Post noted that Tedeschi "sings with soulful authority," and "has no trouble sustaining the right emotional pitch, whether the mood is inspired by gratitude... or guilt..., defiance... or despair."

Writing for ConcertLiveWire.com, John Halverson remarked: "Tedeschi's raspy voice, well-respected in the blues community, helps separate this soul album from the blue-eyed tripe of others... It's true that some of her earlier stuff had a little more grit, but what's wrong with matching up great songs with great voices, no matter who wrote it?"

== Track listing ==
1. "You Got the Silver" (Mick Jagger, Keith Richards) - 2:52
2. "Soul of a Man" (Oliver Sain) - 3:15
3. "Lord Protect My Child" (Bob Dylan) - 4:45
4. "Tired of My Tears" (James E. Holiday, Lewis) - 2:42
5. "Share Your Love with Me" (Alfred Braggs, Deadric Malone) - 3:49
6. "Evidence" (George Jackson, Raymond Moore) - 3:43
7. "Sweet Forgiveness" (Iris DeMent) - 4:47
8. "Security" (Otis Redding, Wesson) - 2:56
9. "Loving You Is Sweeter Than Ever" (Ivy Hunter, Stevie Wonder) - 3:57
10. "Magnificent Sanctuary Band (feat. The Blind Boys of Alabama)" (Dorsey Burnette) - 3:01
11. "Follow" (Jerry Merrick) - 6:48
12. "The Danger Zone" (Percy Mayfield) - 2:42

== Personnel ==
- Susan Tedeschi - vocals
- Paul Bryan - bass
- Niki Haris - background vocals
- Jean McClain - background vocals
- Derek Trucks - dobro, electric guitar
- Jay Bellerose - drums, percussion
- Jebin Bruni - Hammond organ
- Doyle Bramhall II - acoustic & electric guitar
- Dave Palmer - Hammond organ, electric piano
