= Live at Georgia Theatre =

Live album by The Derek Trucks Band
- Released: 2004
- Recorded: October 23, 2003
- Venue: Georgia Theatre (Athens, Georgia)
- Studio: Red Tuxedo Studios (Atlanta, Georgia)
- Genre: Blues-rock, jam rock, southern rock, world fusion
- Length: 1:20:14
- Label: Columbia Records

The Derek Trucks Band chronology
Soul Serenade (2003)	Live at Georgia Theatre (2004)	Songlines (2006)

Live at Georgia Theatre is the fifth album and first live album by American artist Derek Trucks and The Derek Trucks Band released in 2004 (see 2004 in music). The recording marks the first appearance of the band’s newest member, vocalist Mike Mattison.

This album is one of 10 "Live jam releases of this century" according to the August issue of Guitar One magazine.

== Reception ==
Professional ratings
Review scores
Source	Rating
AllMusic	4.5/5 stars
One Way Out: The Inside History of the Allman Brothers Band	3.5/5 stars

In a review for AllMusic, Thom Jurek called the album "an incendiary, soulful, and wildly adventurous set," and wrote: "This is the record to turn the heads of those who haven't gotten hip to Trucks' bottleneck magic. This performance is so inspired, so utterly spellbinding, it transcends the genre classifications it employs to get the music across."

Doug Collette of All About Jazz praised "the dual virtues of individual instrumental chops and band unity" on the album, and noted that "the profoundly imaginative approach Derek Trucks takes to electric guitar is all the more extraordinary given his comparative youth." He commented: "the purity of inspiration and execution over the course of two-plus hours will doubtless bring delight to any true aficionado of progressive music."

Writing for Jambands.com, Jesse Jarnow stated: "Despite the fact that Trucks lends his name to the outfit, the music here goes to great lengths to prove that they are, in fact, a band... The sense of interplay between them is palpable."

== Track listing ==
=== Disc one ===
1. "Kam-Ma-Lay" (Trucks) – 8:53
2. "Gonna Move" (Pena) – 6:29
3. "Volunteered Slavery" (Kirk) – 4:36
4. "Sahib Teri Bandi/Maki Madni" (Khan) – 15:03
5. "Leaving Trunk" (Estes) – 4:58
6. "I Wish I Knew" (Billy Taylor/Dick Dallas) – 5:29
7. "Angola" (Shorter) – 10:12
8. "Feel So Bad" (Chuck Willis) – 7:41

=== Disc two ===
1. "For My Brother" (Trucks) – 13:28
2. "Sonido Alegre" (Victoriano Ramirez) – 15:15
3. "Joyful Noise" (Trucks) – 11:58
4. "So Close, So Far Away" (Kofi Burbridge) – 5:52
5. "Freddie's Dead" (Mayfield) – 10:20

== Personnel ==
- Derek Trucks – guitars
- Kofi Burbridge – keyboards, flute, vocals
- Todd Smallie – bass, vocals
- Yonrico Scott – drums, percussion, vocals
- Count M'Butu – percussion
- Mike Mattison – lead vocals

== Production and Crew ==
- Marty Wall – recording, mixing, live sound engineer
- Alex Lowe – mixing, mastering
- Joe Main – band technician
- Chris Edwards – tour manager
- Bobby Bolton – coach operator
- Rick Stott – coach operator
- Josh Cheuse – art direction
- Jeff Wood – cover design
- Jason Chastain – photography
- Tamera Reisiger – photography
- Vincent Tseng – photography
- Blake Budney – management
- Wayne Forte – booking
