= Park West (music venue) =

Music venue and former movie theater in Chicago, Illinois, United States

Coordinates: 41.91861°N 87.63741°W

- Interactive map of Park West
- Former names: Lane Court Theatre (1916-35); Town Theatre (1935-67); Town Underground Theatre (1967-77)
- Address: 322 W Armitage Ave; Chicago, IL 60614-4711
- Location: Lincoln Park
- Owner: Jam Productions, Ltd.
- Capacity: 1,000 (general admission); 750 (seated)

Construction
- Opened: November 25, 1916
- Architect: Fred Prather

Website
- Venue Website

Park West (originally the Lane Court Theatre) is a concert venue located in Chicago, Illinois. The theater opened in 1916 as a vaudeville and movie theater by the Ascher Brothers. Currently, it can house up to 1,000 guests in a general admission setting.

== About ==
The theater opened in the 1910s, with a capacity of 1,000 people. In 1965, the theater became the "Town Theatre", eventually showing adult films and featuring live burlesque by 1967. In the 1970s, it was purchased by Dale Niedermaier and John May, refurbished and reopened as "Park West", the music venue and special events space May 11, 1977. The theater hosts a variety of bands, most of which perform classic rock or alternative rock. It is also home to many fundraising events, including the Starlight Foundation's "Dream Date Auction", and awards ceremonies, including the annual "Non-Equity Jeff Awards".

== Noted performers ==
- Adele
- Aimee Mann
- Ani DiFranco
- Anthony Newley
- Aretha Franklin
- Ben Folds Five
- Beth Hart
- Blondie (band)
- Bob Dylan
- Brandon Flowers
- Charlie Puth
- Chicago
- Chickenfoot
- Cyndi Lauper
- The Dandy Warhols
- The Darkness
- David Sylvian
- The Derek Trucks Band
- Don McLean
- Dionne Warwick
- Duran Duran
- Eurythmics
- Elton John
- Fall Out Boy
- Feist
- Gary Numan
- Gene Simmons
- Genesis
- Gil Scott-Heron
- Gloria Gaynor
- Gov’t Mule
- Grace Jones
- Hall & Oates
- Halsey
- Jamie Cullum
- John Prine
- Jon McLaughlin
- Kate Nash
- Kraftwerk
- John Kay & Steppenwolf
- King Crimson
- Logic
- Lucinda Williams
- Neil Sedaka
- Oh My Girl
- Paloma Faith
- Pat Benatar
- Patti Smith
- Paula Cole
- Pete Yorn
- The Police
- Poppy (singer)
- Prince
- Rakim
- Lou Reed
- Renaissance
- Rory Gallagher
- Todd Rundgren
- Saint Etienne
- Shawn Colvin
- Sheri Passalino
- Sister Sledge
- Tegan and Sara
- Thin Lizzy
- Tina Turner
- Tom Odell
- Trixie Mattel
- U2
- Van Morrison
- Whitney Houston
- "Weird Al" Yankovic

== Live media production venue ==
- 1980: Dionne Warwick:Live at Parkwest—broadcast of a 1980 concert by Dionne Warwick, as a part of the Soundstage series.
- 1982: The Name of This Band Is Talking Heads—a live album by Talking Heads. Features a live recording of "The Big Country" from 1978.
- 1983: Tina Turner: Live in Chicago—broadcast of a 1983 concert by Tina Turner, as a part of the Soundstage series.
- 1985: Aretha Franklin: Live at Park West—broadcast of a 1985 concert by Aretha Franklin, as a part of the Soundstage series.
- 1985: I Have a Pony— comedy album by Steven Wright, recorded at Wolfgang's in San Francisco and Park West.
- 1996: Costello & Nieve—a live album by Elvis Costello and Steve Nieve. Features five songs recorded at the theater in 1996
- 1997: Home—single released by Sheryl Crow. Contains four tracks recorded at the theater in March 1997.
- 1998: Live from the Choirgirl Hotel—radio and web broadcast of a concert by Tori Amos.
- 2001: Live—a live album by J. J. Cale.
- 2005: Arriving Somewhere..., a live DVD by Porcupine Tree released in 2006 and 2008.
- 2006: Songlines Live—a live album by The Derek Trucks Band.
- 2010: Live in Chicago—a live album by Renaissance from their 1983 tour.
- 2015: September '78—a live album by John Prine recorded at the theater in 1978.
