= Joyful Noise (album) =

Studio album by The Derek Trucks Band
- Released: September 2, 2002
- Studio: Bearsville Studios (Woodstock, New York); The Magic Shop (New York City, New York); The Sound Factory (Hollywood, California)
- Genre: Southern rock, jam rock, blues rock, jazz fusion, world music
- Length: 56:04
- Label: Columbia
- Producer: Russ Kunkel; Craig Street

The Derek Trucks Band chronology
Out of the Madness (1998)	Joyful Noise (2002)	Soul Serenade (2003)

Joyful Noise is the third studio album by The Derek Trucks Band, released on September 2, 2002. It features an eclectic mix of music, ranging from gospel, blues, jazz fusion, Latin music, to East Indian music. Many of the songs feature special guests, including Trucks' wife Susan Tedeschi, Rahat Fateh Ali Khan, the nephew of Ustad Nusrat Fateh Ali Khan and a respected singer in his own right, and soul artist Solomon Burke. The album was produced by noted producers Russ Kunkel and Craig Street and was recorded at the Bearsville and Sunset Sound Studios. This is also the first album to feature the songwriting and musical talents of the band's newest member, Kofi Burbridge; keyboardist, flautist, and backing vocalist for the band, as well as brother to Oteil Burbridge, bassist in The Allman Brothers Band, with whom Derek Trucks is also a member.

== Reception ==
Professional ratings
Review scores
Source	Rating
AllMusic	4/5 stars
Rolling Stone	3/5 stars
JazzTimes	(very favorable)
Jambands: The Complete Guide to the Players, Music, & Scene	4.5/5 stars
One Way Out: The Inside History of the Allman Brothers Band	4/5 stars
Daily Vault	B+

In a review for AllMusic, Hal Horowitz called the album "a powerful, uncompromising statement," and wrote: "Prodding into Latin, Indian, and fusion jazz, this stylistically varied effort exudes enough blues and funky R&B to keep the Allman Brothers Band fan's attention while expanding their boundaries -- sometimes radically -- beyond what the typical Southern rock fan might expect or even tolerate."

Christian Hoard of Rolling Stone commented: "Boring-ass eclecticism is the hobgoblin of the jam-band nation, but here the kid tames a stylistic sprawl with nothing more than a bottleneck slide."

Writing for JazzTimes, Lucy Tauss called Trucks "prodigiously gifted," and described the album as "a gloriously eclectic excursion that ranges far beyond the Allmans' Southern jam-rock sound."

Author Dean Budnick praised Trucks' "emotive counterpoints" and the "ebullient support from his bandmates," and called the album "a stellar representation of the DTB's world-soul."

In an article for PopMatters, Adrien Begrand remarked: "Far from a self-indulgent, noodling showman who opts for bland style, Trucks goes for the more understated substance... The album is slick, but not overproduced in the least, the jamming never gets too self-indulgent, and Trucks' diverse choices in guest vocalists, and his band's undeniable talent, make Joyful Noise sparkle with life."

Exclaim!'s Roman Sokal wrote: "Trucks... goes straight for the soul and spirit of music making... he overpowers without needing to be loud, and he allows all the musicians to be on top throughout; a magician, no less."

Reviewer George Graham stated that the album is "a first-rate recording from one of the bright young lights on the rock guitar scene," and commented: "In addition to being a fine player, Trucks' musical eclecticism is also impressive, incorporating everything from old-fashioned soul to unexpected world-music influences."

The Daily Vault's Jason Warburg remarked: "This is one of the most diverse albums I've heard in some time... These are four pure players who make a Joyful Noise indeed together, and this disc is a very worthy purchase for any fan of roots music or blues guitar who also has a sense of adventure."

== Track listing ==
No.	Title	Length
1.	"Joyful Noise" (J. Colon/Y. Scott/D. Trucks/K. Burbridge/T. Smallie)	5:47
2.	"So Close, So Far Away" (Scott/Trucks/Burbridge/Smallie)	4:38
3.	"Home in Your Heart" (feat. Solomon Burke) (O. Blackwell/W. Scott)	3:59
4.	"Maki Madni" (feat. Rahat Nusrat Fateh Ali Khan) (Nusrat Fateh Ali Khan)	8:11
5.	"Kam-Ma-Lay" (feat. Rubén Blades) (R. Blades/Colon/Scott/Trucks/Burbridge/Smallie)	7:08
6.	"Like Anyone Else" (feat. Solomon Burke) (Burbridge)	6:30
7.	"Every Good Boy" (Burbridge)	4:23
8.	"Baby, You're Right" (feat. Susan Tedeschi) (J. Brown, J. Tex)	4:14
9.	"Lookout 31" (Burbridge)	4:21
10.	"Frisell" (Colon/Scott/Trucks/Burbridge/Smallie)	6:53

== Personnel ==
The Derek Trucks Band

- Derek Trucks – guitars
- Kofi Burbridge – keyboards, flute, vocals,
- Todd Smallie – bass guitar, vocals
- Yonrico Scott - drums, percussion, vocals

Additional personnel

- Count M'Butu – congas, percussion
- Javier Colon – percussion (1, 2, 5, 10), vocals (1, 2, 5, 10)
- Solomon Burke – lead vocals (3)
- Rahat Fateh Ali Khan – lead vocals (4)
- Rubén Blades – lead vocals (5), cowbell (5), handclaps (5)
- Susan Tedeschi – lead vocals (8)

=== Production ===
- Yves Beauvais – A&R
- Craig Street – producer (1, 2, 4–7, 9, 10)
- Russ Kunkel – producer (3, 8)
- S. Husky Höskulds – engineer, mixing
- Nathan Burden – assistant engineer
- Juan García – assistant engineer
- Damian Shannon – assistant engineer
- Greg Calbi – mastering at Sterling Sound (New York, NY)
- Josh Cheuse – art direction, design
- James Minchin III – photography
- Yonrico Scott – illustration
- Jonathan Kraut – graphics
- Jiddu Krishnamurti – liner notes
- Blake Budney – management
- Kelly Elder – management

== Charts ==
Chart	Provider(s)	Peak position
US Billboard Top Heatseekers	RIAA	20
US Billboard Top Heatseekers (Northeast)	RIAA	5
US Billboard Top Internet Albums	RIAA	20
