= Songlines (The Derek Trucks Band album) =

Studio album by The Derek Trucks Band
- Released: February 21, 2006
- Recorded: 2005
- Studio: Tragedy/Tragedy (Nashville, Tennessee)
- Genre: Blues rock, Southern rock, world fusion, jam rock
- Length: 53:52
- Label: Columbia
- Producer: Jay Joyce

The Derek Trucks Band chronology
Live at Georgia Theatre (2004)	Songlines (2006)	Already Free (2009)

Songlines is the fifth studio album by American slide guitarist Derek Trucks and his group the Derek Trucks Band. This is the group's first studio album to feature an expanded sextet.

== Reception ==
Professional ratings
Review scores
Source	Rating
AllMusic	4.5/5 stars
All About Jazz	5/5 stars
One Way Out: The Inside History of the Allman Brothers Band	4/5 stars
Rolling Stone	3.5/5 stars

In a review for AllMusic, Thom Jurek wrote: "Songlines is the finest moment in the Derek Trucks Band's recording career. It's a fully mature, deeply reckoned studio album that bears repeated listening to reveal all its subtlety and the beauty of its creation."

Ben Ratliff of The New York Times called Trucks' guitar work "a delicious pleasure," and stated that the album "improves on the five that preceded it," noting that "There's more texture, more layers of sound, and the producer, Jay Joyce, has artfully dirtied it up with reverb and mixing techniques."

The Washington Post's Geoffrey Himes described the album as "the best jam-band album of the new decade," and noted that it "has set up the baby-faced kid in the blond ponytail as the movement's most likely leader into the next decade."

Writing for All About Jazz, Doug Collette commented: "This album completely captures the diverse strengths of the group and its leader... Trucks' deceptively unassuming presence becomes the focal point that inspires his band, elevating Songlines to an absolutely stellar level."

In an article for JazzTimes, Bill Milkowski wrote: "A remarkably expressive player, Trucks continues to explore on his instrument outside the confines of his regular touring gig with the Allman Brothers. This adventurous CD is the next step in his ongoing journey."

Reviewer George Graham remarked: "Some jam bands can go on for hours without much interesting music happening. Derek Trucks... has never been one to fall victim to jam-band noodling. His palette is wide, his playing is imaginative and his band still rocks."

== Track listing ==
1. "Volunteered Slavery" (Rahsaan Roland Kirk) – 2:05
2. "I'll Find My Way" (Trucks, Jay Joyce) – 4:23
3. "Crow Jane" (Skip James) – 3:53
4. "Sahib Teri Bandi/Maki Madni" (Nusrat Fateh Ali Khan) – 9:53
5. "Chevrolet" (Ed Young, Lonnie Young) – 2:24
6. "Sailing On" (Toots Hibbert) – 3:47
7. "Revolution" (Jay Joyce) – 3:08
8. "I'd Rather Be Blind, Crippled and Crazy" (Darryl Carter, Charles Hodges, Don Robey) – 4:33
9. "All I Do" (Trucks, Mike Mattison, Todd Smallie, Yonrico Scott, Kofi Burbridge) – 6:31
10. "Mahjoun" (Trucks) – 2:27
11. "I Wish I Knew (How It Would Feel To Be Free)" (Dick Dallas, Billy Taylor) – 4:07
12. "This Sky" (Trucks, Mike Mattison, Jay Joyce) – 6:31

== Personnel ==
Derek Trucks Band

- Derek Trucks – guitars, dobro
- Kofi Burbridge – keyboards, flute, vocals
- Todd Smallie – bass, vocals
- Yonrico Scott – drums, percussion, vocals
- Count M'Butu – congas, percussion
- Mike Mattison – vocals

With:

- Jay Joyce – additional keyboards
- Marty Wall – handclaps (11)

== Production ==
- Yves Beauvais – A&R
- Jay Joyce – producer, recording, mixing
- Jason Hall – recording, mix assistant
- Giles Reaves – recording
- Jim DeMain – mastering at Yes Master (Nashville, Tennessee)
- Josh Cheuse – art direction, design
- Jeff Wood – cover design, cover illustration
- James Minchin III – photography
- Yonrico Scott – setlist illustration
- Wayne Forte – booking
- Blake Budney – management

Crew

- Marty Wall – live sound engineer
- Chris Edwards – tour manager
- Bobby Bolton – coach operator
