= Soul Serenade (Derek Trucks album) =

Studio album by The Derek Trucks Band
- Released: August 5, 2003
- Recorded: February 13, 1999 – April 12, 2000; Gregg Allman recorded April 12, 2000
- Studio: Dockside Studios (Maurice, Louisiana); Reeltime Studios (Savannah, Georgia)
- Genre: Southern rock, jam rock, jazz fusion, blues rock, world fusion
- Length: 42:37 + 9:23 MOV files
- Label: Columbia
- Producer: John Snyder, Derek Trucks

The Derek Trucks Band chronology
Joyful Noise (2002)	Soul Serenade (2003)	Live at Georgia Theatre (2004)

Soul Serenade is the fourth studio album by American jam band The Derek Trucks Band, released in 2003. Soul Serenade may also be considered the band's third album, as it was recorded in its entirety before Joyful Noise, but was held up in legalities, and therefore released later.

Soul Serenade continues this band's exploration of genre ambiguity. Refusing to be tied to a single genre (Blues, specifically) alienated some fans, but has allowed Trucks and his band to express themselves creatively in ways that would not be possible if confined to a single genre. Increasingly, the band, with a blues base, embraces world music. This album was released as an Enhanced CD, and contains six QuickTime-format interview clips with Trucks.

== Reception ==
Professional ratings
Review scores
Source	Rating
AllMusic	3/5 stars
One Way Out: The Inside History of the Allman Brothers Band	3/5 stars

In a review for AllMusic, Robert L. Doerschuk wrote: "By almost any measure, this is a jazz album; the only references to rock can be heard in the overdriven tone and bluesy slide phrasing that Trucks consistently employs... The rhythm feel is subtle... with an understated swing that borrows from this or that corner of world music but unmistakably centers itself on jazz practice."

Justin Cober-Lake of PopMatters stated: "Each musician in the band is supremely talented and a large part of the band's success is due to the members' willingness to share time at the front of the sound... the album contains no filler... Although the individual artists may not have sought attention on Soul Serenade, the Derek Trucks Band deserves to be noticed."

Writing for JazzTimes, Brian Gilmore commented: "It won't matter how this album is classified... because it has it all... the Derek Trucks Band is hitting on all cylinders from start to finish... [the] band stays tight and focused at all times, letting the guitarist roam where he needs."

In an article for All About Jazz, C. Michael Bailey remarked: "Derek Trucks may safely be considered the logical extension of the art of Duane Allman without simply being an imitation... the guitarist proves himself a clever and capable leader, not afraid to visit new or old themes."

Billboard's Philip van Vleck noted that the tunes on the album "evince Trucks' continuing gravitation toward jazz in particular and eclecticism in general," and called his guitar work "adventuresome and powerful." He wrote: "He may be associated with the Allman Brothers Band, but when Trucks works with his group, Pat Metheny may be a more relevant reference."

Author Alan Paul called Gregg Allman's performance on "Drown in My Own Tears" "one of his best vocal tracks of the new millennium."

== Track listing ==
No.	Title	Length
1.	"Soul Serenade/Rasta Man Chant" (C. Ousley/L. Dixon/B. Marley)	10:37
2.	"Bock to Bock" (B. Montgomery)	5:59
3.	"Drown in My Own Tears" (H. Glover)	5:08
4.	"Afro Blue" (M. Santamaria)	5:42
5.	"Elvin" (Trucks/Smallie/Scott/McKay/Burbridge)	6:10
6.	"Oriental Folk Song" (Wayne Shorter)	6:43
7.	"Sierra Leone" (Trucks/Scott/Burbridge)	2:15

Enhanced CD interview tracks

No.	Title	Length
1.	"Soul Serenade"	1:24
2.	"Musical Evolution"	1:32
3.	"Indian Masters"	1:22
4.	"Spirituality in Music"	1:07
5.	"Being in the Moment"	1:22
6.	"Making Music Today"	2:36

== Personnel ==
Derek Trucks Band

- Derek Trucks – guitars, sarod
- Kofi Burbridge – keyboards, acoustic piano, Rhodes electric piano, clavinet, flute
- Todd Smallie – bass guitar
- Yonrico Scott – drums, percussion

Additional personnel

- Bill McKay – keyboards, Wurlitzer electric piano, Hammond B3 organ
- Gregg Allman – vocals (3)

=== Production ===
- John Snyder – producer
- Derek Trucks – producer
- Tony Daigle – engineer
- Robert Willis – engineer for Gregg Allman (3)
- Jim Mageras – mastering at Sound Bunker (Darien, Connecticut)
- Josh Cheuse – art direction, design, additional photography
- William Eggleston – cover photography
- Chris Floyd – additional photography
- Martin Shulman – videography, video editing
- Joe Capone – interviewer
- Wayne Forte – booking
- Blake Budney – management
- Marty Wall and Joe Main – crew

== Charts ==
Chart	Peak position
US Top Heatseekers (Billboard)	20
US Top Internet Albums (Billboard)	20
