= Scrapomatic =

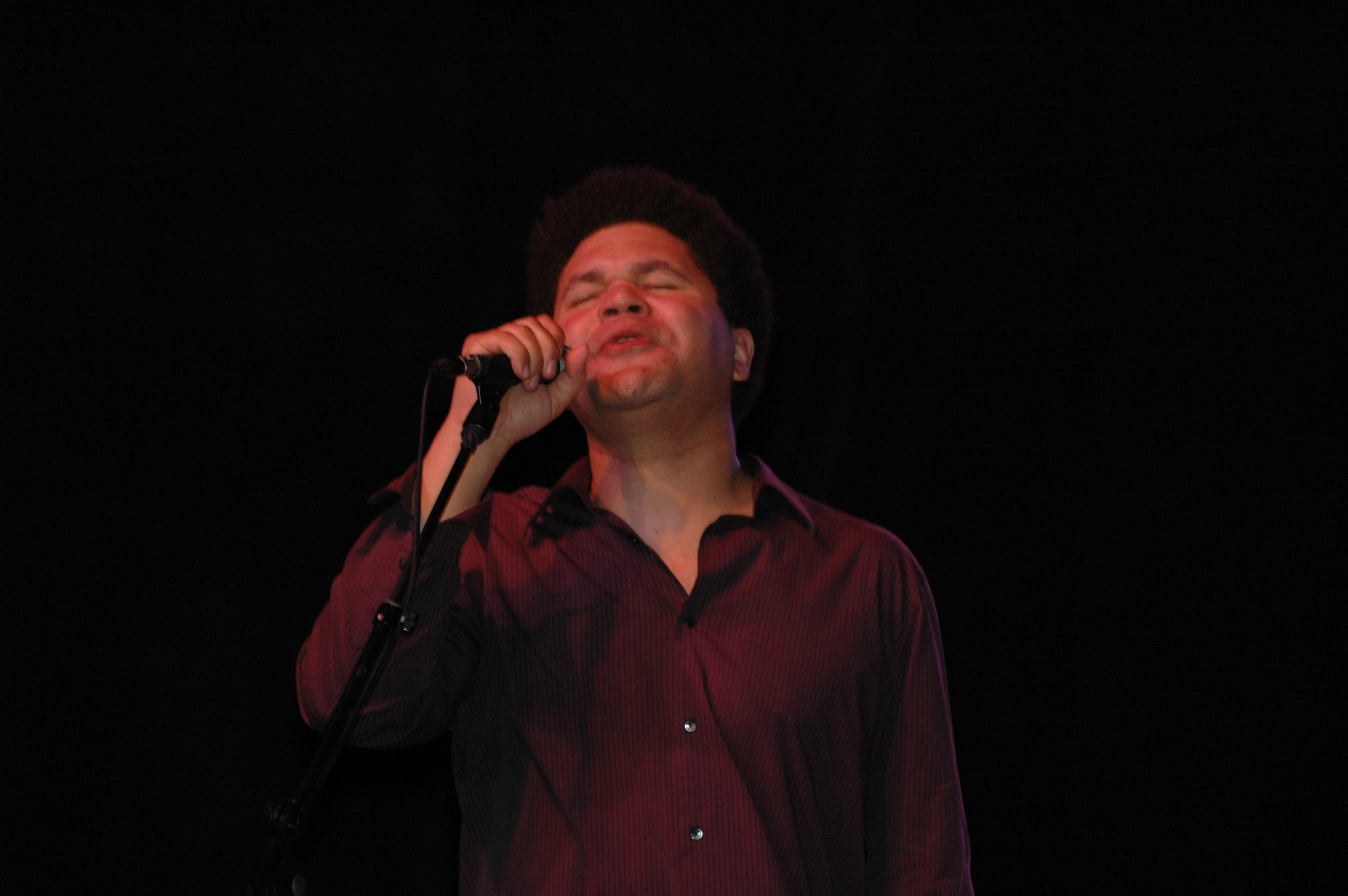
- Vocalist Mattison December 29, 2006

Background information
- Origin: Saint Paul, Minnesota United States
- Genres: Soul, jazz fusion, jam band, blues, blues rock
- Years active: 2002–present
- Labels: Alligator Records, Landslide Records, Artists House,
- Members: Mike Mattison; Paul Olsen; Dave Yoke
- Website: www.scrapomatic.com/

Scrapomatic is an American blues trio, consisting of Paul Olsen, Mike Mattison and Dave Yoke. Mattison and Olsen formed the band as a duo in the mid-1990s, and often opened for The Derek Trucks Band, which Mattison served as lead vocalist from 2002 until their breakup in 2010. Yoke began playing with Scrapomatic in 2007 and joined the band prior to the release of their fourth record, I'm a Stranger and I Love the Night.

== Biography ==
Scrapomatic was founded as a duo in Minneapolis-Saint Paul, Minnesota, by Paul Olsen and Mike Mattison, who were raised and schooled there. Both musicians were taught separately but came to embrace an Americana-flavored roots-based approach to music. Both had formal musical training and found common ground in jazz and funk rhythms. They gained recognition when the duo were nominated for Best R&B Group and Best Male Vocalist by the Minnesota Music Awards. After a move to Brooklyn, they have performed throughout New York City, and played Carnegie Hall.

Olsen is now primarily active as an ASCAP award-winning songwriter, producer and musical director. Mattison is involved in several projects that have sprung from his association with Derek Trucks, including his bands.

== Career ==
2003 was the year that the two men released their first self-titled album, Scrapomatic, receiving good reviews. Scrapomatic often are the opening act for The Derek Trucks Band and Susan Tedeschi.

== Discography ==
- 2002 - Scrapomatic (Artists House)
- 2006 - Alligator Love Cry (Alligator Records)
- 2008 - Sidewalk Caesars (Landslide Records)
- 2012 - I'm a Stranger and I Love The Night (Landslide Records)
