= Derek Trucks =

American guitarist, bandleader and songwriter (born 1979)

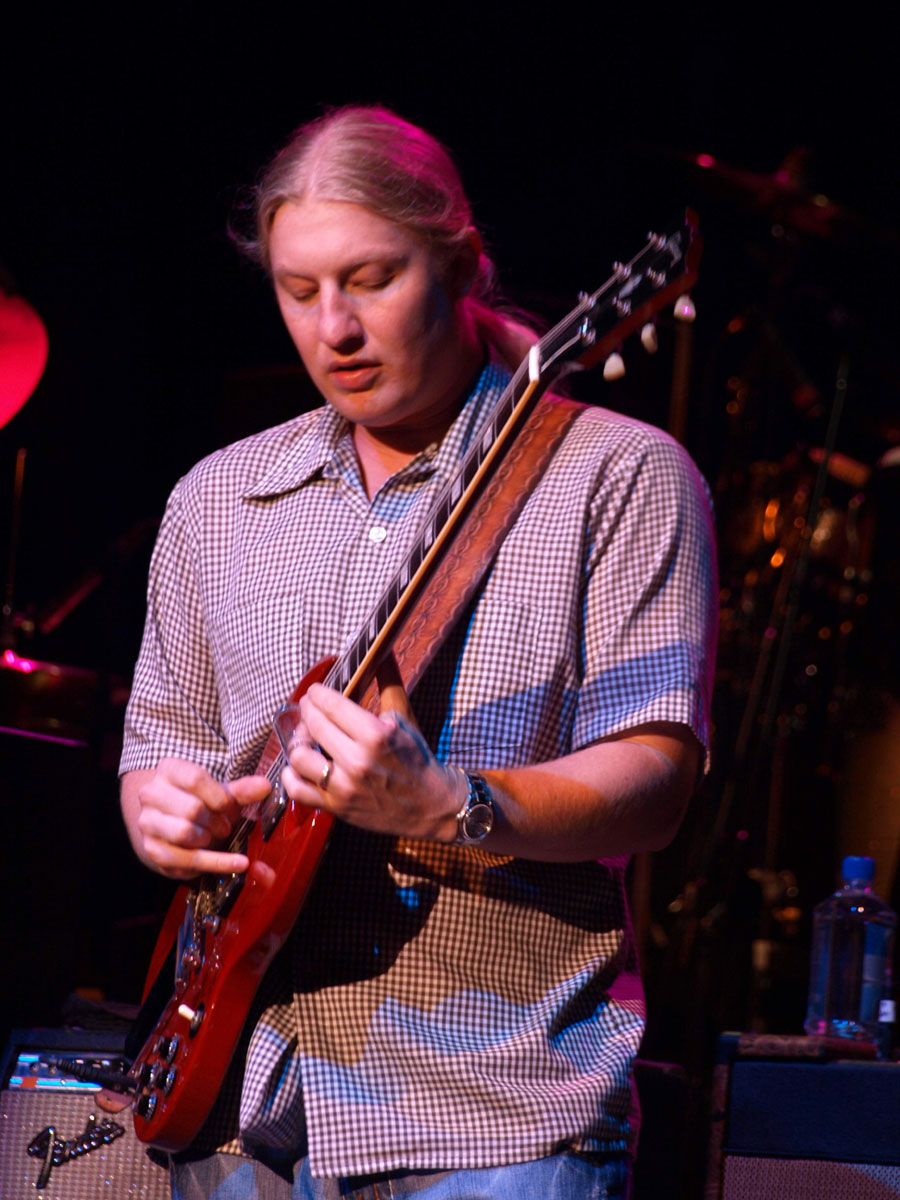
- Derek Trucks with a Gibson SG in 2009

Background information
- Born: June 8, 1979 (age 47); Jacksonville, Florida, U.S.
- Genres: Blues; rock; jazz; jam; soul; southern rock
- Occupations: Musician; songwriter
- Instruments: Guitar; sarod
- Years active: 1990–present
- Labels: Columbia; Legacy Recordings
- Member of: Tedeschi Trucks Band
- Formerly of: The Allman Brothers Band; The Derek Trucks Band
- Website: www.derektrucks.com

Derek Trucks (born June 8, 1979) is an American guitarist, songwriter, and founder of The Derek Trucks Band. He became an official member of The Allman Brothers Band in 1999. In 2010, he formed the Tedeschi Trucks Band with his wife, blues singer/guitarist Susan Tedeschi. His musical style encompasses several genres and he has twice appeared on Rolling Stone's list of 100 Greatest Guitarists of All Time. He is the nephew of the late Butch Trucks, drummer for the Allman Brothers.

== Early life ==
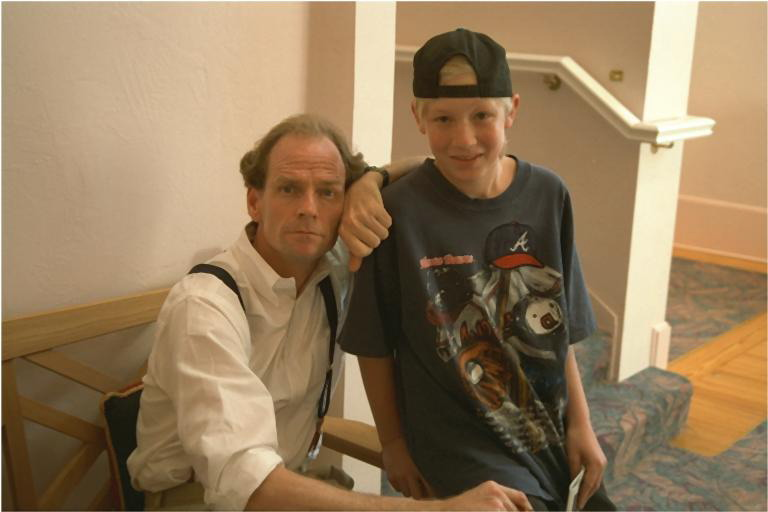
A young Trucks (right) with musician Livingston Taylor

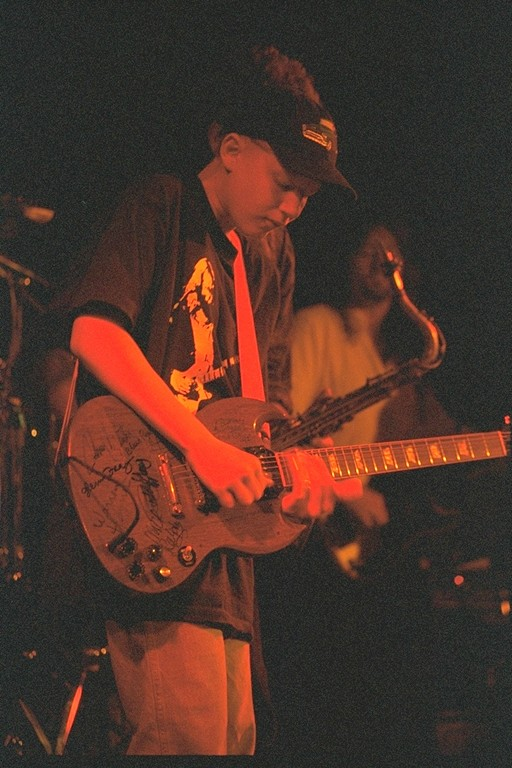
Trucks age 9–10 with the Gregg Allman band

Trucks was born in Jacksonville, Florida. Trucks bought his first guitar at a yard sale for $5 at age nine and became a child prodigy, playing his first paid performance at age 11. Trucks began playing the guitar using a slide because it allowed him to play the guitar despite his small hands as a young guitarist. By his 13th birthday, Trucks had played alongside Buddy Guy and toured with Thunderhawk.

== Career ==
Trucks formed The Derek Trucks Band in 1994, and by his 20th birthday, he had played with such artists as Bob Dylan, Joe Walsh, and Stephen Stills. In 1999, he toured as a member of Phil Lesh & Friends. After performing with The Allman Brothers Band for several years as a guest musician, Trucks became a formal member of the band in 1999 and appeared on the albums Peakin' at the Beacon, Live at the Beacon Theatre, Hittin' the Note and One Way Out. In 2006 Trucks began a studio collaboration with JJ Cale and Eric Clapton called The Road to Escondido and performed with three bands in 17 countries that year. Trucks was invited to perform at the 2007 Crossroads Guitar Festival, and after the festival, he toured as part of Clapton's band.

"Why Does Love Got to Be So Sad" (2007)
Sample of "Why Does Love Got to Be So Sad", performed by Eric Clapton's band featuring Derek Trucks, live at the 2007 Crossroads Guitar Festival

== Merging talents ==
Trucks built a studio in his home in January 2008, which he and his band used to record their album: Already Free. Trucks and his wife, Susan Tedeschi, combined their bands to form the Soul Stew Revival in 2007, and performed at the Bonnaroo Music Festival in June 2008. In late 2009, Trucks and his band went on hiatus, after which the band dissolved. In 2010, Trucks formed the Tedeschi Trucks Band with his wife. On January 8, 2014, Trucks announced that he and fellow guitarist Warren Haynes planned to leave the Allman Brothers Band at the end of 2014. That band announced its retirement, with Trucks playing as a member through their final show on October 28, 2014, at the Beacon Theatre in New York City.

== Musical style ==
Trucks credits guitarist Duane Allman and bluesman Elmore James as the two slide guitarists who influenced his early style, but he has since been inspired by John Lee Hooker, Ali Akbar Khan, Howlin' Wolf, Albert King, Miles Davis, Sun Ra, John Coltrane, Charlie Parker, Django Reinhardt, Charlie Christian, Wayne Shorter, Toy Caldwell, Johnny Winter, Freddie King and B.B. King.

His music is rooted in blues and rock, embracing jam band, Southern rock, and jazz. Trucks plays an eclectic blend of blues, soul, jazz, rock, qawwali music (a genre of music from Pakistan and western India), Latin music, and other kinds of world music Trucks became a fan of Khan, a Hindustani classical musician known for his virtuosity in playing the sarod and popularising Indian classical music in the West, often in conjunction with sitar virtuoso Ravi Shankar. Trucks studied at the Ali Akbar College of Music in San Rafael, California. Speaking of Khan, Trucks says "there are two recordings, which are part of my 'desert-island' disc… One is called Signature Series Volume II. Whenever I need to wipe the slate clean, I listen to it."

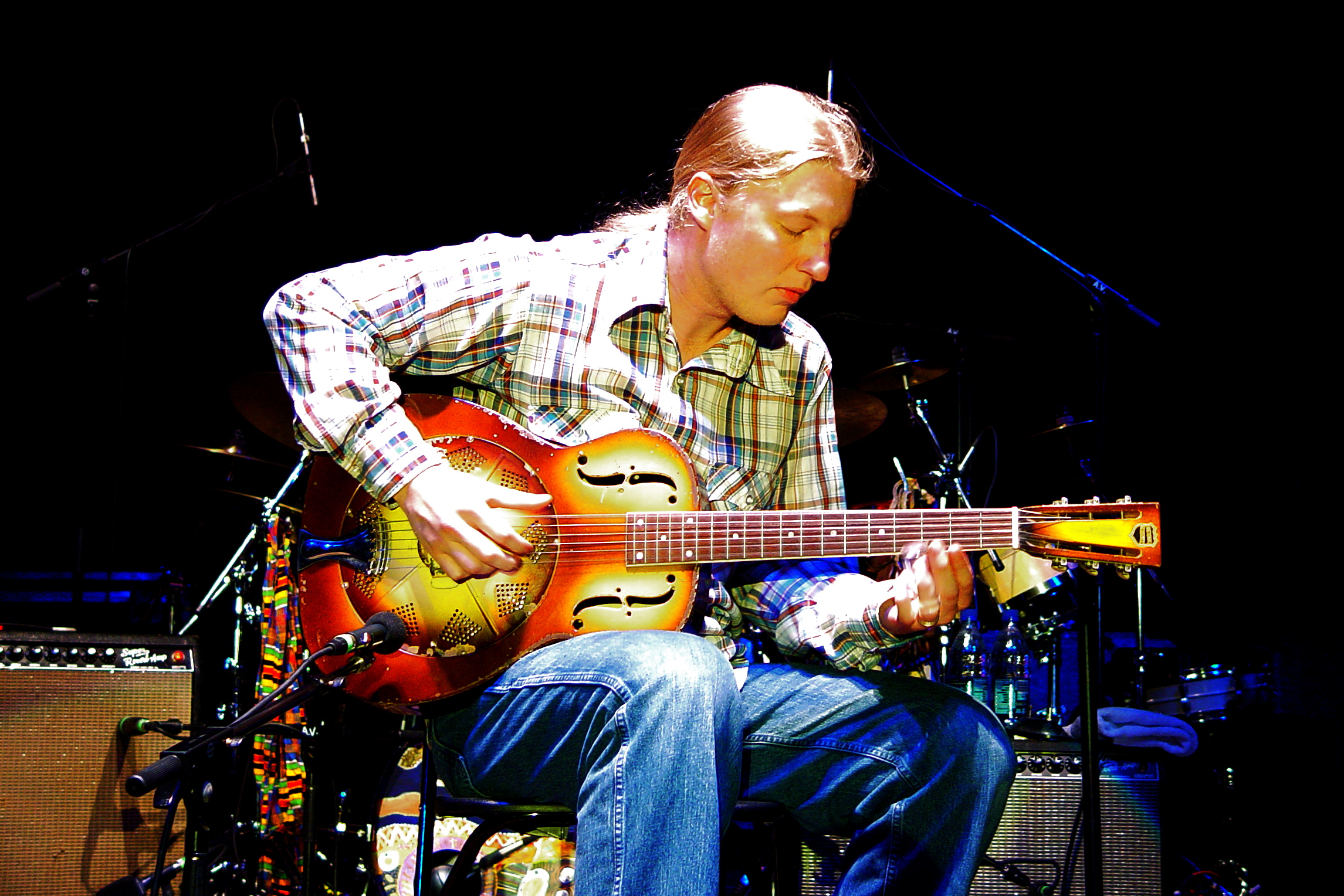
Trucks playing a resonator guitar

Trucks plays guitar in an open E tuning, using his signature glass slide by Dunlop, modeled off of an old Coricidin bottle but without the seam.

In 2006, two vintage (1965 and 1968) Fender Super Reverb amplifiers, a Hammond B-3 organ, two Leslie speaker cabinets, and a Hohner E-7 clavinet were stolen from Trucks and later recovered by the Atlanta Police Department.

== Reception ==
Trucks has appeared twice in Rolling Stone's list of "The 100 Greatest Guitarists of All Time". He was listed as 81st in 2003 and 16th in 2011. A 2006 article in The Wall Street Journal described him as "the most awe-inspiring electric slide guitar player performing today". In 2007, Trucks appeared on the cover of Rolling Stone for an article called the "New Guitar Gods". Trucks is a creative guitarist according to his uncle, the late Allman Brothers drummer Butch Trucks: "He never does the same thing twice". In 2009, Ernest Suarez of The Washington Post described Trucks' guitar style as "notes and chords that soar, slice, and glide, sounding like a cross between Duane Allman on a '61 Gibson Les Paul and John Coltrane on tenor sax". The Derek Trucks Band's album Already Free debuted at number 19 on the Billboard Top 200 chart, and number one on the Internet chart, number four on the rock chart, and number one on the blues chart.

In 2010, The Derek Trucks Band won the Grammy Award for Best Contemporary Blues Album for the album Already Free. In 2012, Trucks and Tedeschi won the Grammy Award for Best Blues Album for the Tedeschi Trucks Band's debut album Revelator. On February 12, 2012, Trucks accepted a Grammy Lifetime Achievement Award along with 10 other members of The Allman Brothers Band. On February 21, 2012, Derek Trucks and his wife joined other blues musicians for a performance at the White House for President Obama and his guests.

In September 2012, John Mayer and Derek Trucks joined B.B. King on stage at the Hollywood Bowl for an encore version of B.B.'s song "Guess Who". Concluding the performance, B.B. King made several remarks about Trucks's guitar work, ending with, "That's about as good as I've ever heard it—as good as I've ever heard it, and I mean it".

== Personal life ==
Trucks' late uncle, Butch Trucks, was a founding member and drummer of The Allman Brothers Band. His younger brother is Duane Trucks, who is a member of Widespread Panic and Hard Working Americans. His great-uncle, Virgil Trucks, was a major league baseball pitcher in the 1940s and 1950s, winning 177 games in his career.

In 2001, Trucks married singer and musician Susan Tedeschi, and they had a son in March 2002 and a daughter in 2004. Trucks is a fan of the Atlanta Braves, the Florida State Seminoles, and his hometown Jacksonville Jaguars.

== Discography ==
=== With the Derek Trucks Band ===
- The Derek Trucks Band (1997)
- Out of the Madness (1998)
- Joyful Noise (2002)
- Soul Serenade (2003)
- Live at Georgia Theatre (2004)
- Songlines (2006)
- Songlines Live (DVD) (2006)
- Already Free (2009)
- Roadsongs (2010)

=== With the Allman Brothers Band ===
- Peakin' at the Beacon (2000)
- Hittin' the Note (2003)
- One Way Out (2004)

=== With the Tedeschi Trucks Band ===
- Revelator (2011)
- Everybody's Talkin' (2012)
- Made Up Mind (2013)
- Let Me Get By (2016)
- Live from the Fox Oakland (2017)
- Signs (2019)
- High and Mighty EP (2019)
- Layla Revisited (Live at Lockn') (2021)
- I Am the Moon: I. Crescent (2022)
- I Am the Moon: II. Ascension (2022)
- I Am the Moon: III. The Fall (2022)
- I Am the Moon: IV. Farewell (2022)
- Mad Dogs & Englishmen Revisited (Live at Lockn') (2025)
- Future Soul (2026)

=== Collaborations ===
- 1994: Storm Warning, Tinsley Ellis
- 1996: To Cry You a Song: A Tull Tale, Various Artists/"Cat's Squirrel" (with Charlie Musselwhite, Clive Bunker, Mick Abrahams)
- 1996: The Circle, Planet Earth/Carey Nall
- 1996: Come On in This House, Junior Wells
- 1997: Searching for Simplicity, Gregg Allman
- 1999: Blues Power: Songs of Eric Clapton, Various Artists
- 1999: Tangled Up In Blues: Songs of Bob Dylan, Various Artists
- 1999: Whole Lotta Blues: Songs of Led Zeppelin, Various Artists
- 1999: Live... With a Little Help from Our Friends, Gov't Mule
- 2000: Croakin' at Toad's, Frogwings
- 2001: Project Z, Project Z
- 2002: Live in the Classic City, Widespread Panic
- 2002: Wait For Me, Susan Tedeschi
- 2003: Little Worlds, Béla Fleck and the Flecktones
- 2005: The Best Kept Secret, Jerry Douglas
- 2005: Hope and Desire, Susan Tedeschi
- 2006: The Road to Escondido, JJ Cale, Eric Clapton
- 2007: Guiding Star, Vusi Mahlasela
- 2008: Skin Deep, Buddy Guy
- 2008: Here and Gone, David Sanborn
- 2008: Sidewalk Caesars, Scrapomatic
- 2008: The Blues Rolls On, Elvin Bishop
- 2008: Back to the River, Susan Tedeschi
- 2008: Lifeboat, Jimmy Herring
- 2008: Guitars, McCoy Tyner
- 2010: The Imagine Project, Herbie Hancock
- 2010: Clapton, Eric Clapton
- 2011: The Secret, Bouriema Vieux Farka Touré
- 2012: Great Gypsy Soul, Tommy Bolin & Friends
- 2014: The Breeze: An Appreciation of JJ Cale, Eric Clapton
- 2015: Ol' Glory, JJ Grey & Mofro
- 2016: Blood From a Stone, Eric Krasno
