= Songlines Live =

Video by The Derek Trucks Band
- Released: July 11, 2006
- Recorded: January 28, 2006 in Chicago, IL
- Genre: Blues-rock, southern rock, jam rock, jazz fusion, world fusion
- Length: 138:44
- Label: Legacy
- Producer: Evan Haiman

Songlines Live is the seventh album and second commercially released live recording and first DVD by American jam band The Derek Trucks Band, released in 2006 (see 2006 in music). It was recorded at the Park West in Chicago, Illinois.

== Reception ==
In a review for All About Jazz Doug Collette stated that, on the DVD, the band "demonstrates what a wide vocabulary they possess, musically and intellectually, and how articulate they are in its use." He commented: "their stage presence is the natural theatre of serious musicians, intent on playing together in a way that maximizes the rapport they've built up over the years... it's clear they love to listen and watch one another, feeding ideas back and forth to enliven they playing."

== Track listing ==
0. Band interview introduction – 4:05
1. "Joyful Noise" (Burbridge/Trucks/Smallie/Scott/Colon) – 8:31
2. "Crow Jane" (Public domain) – 5:51
3. "Sahib Teri Bandi/Maki Madni" (Khan) – 10:38
4. "Volunteered Slavery" (Kirk) – 2:19
5. "I'll Find My Way" (Trucks/Joyce) – 4:44
6. "I Wish I Knew (How It Would Feel To Be Free)" (Taylor/Dallas) – 6:19
7. "Key to the Highway" (Broonzy/Segar) – 6:33
8. "I'd Rather Be Blind, Crippled and Crazy" (Carter/Hodges/Robey) – 6:40
9. "All I Do" (Trucks/Mattison/Smallie/Scott/Burbridge) – 5:45
10. "Mahjoun/Greensleeves" (Trucks)/(Traditional) – 9:59
11. "Sailing On" (Hibbert) – 5:10
12. "Chevrolet" (Young/Young) – 3:42
13. "Soul Serenade" (Dixon/Curtis) – 5:15
14. "For My Brother" (Trucks/Mattison/Smallie/Scott/Burbridge) – 9:04
15. "Feel So Bad" (Hopkins) – 7:39
16. "Let's Go Get Stoned" (Armstead/Ashford/Simpson) – 4:39
17. "Voices Inside (Everything Is Everything)/Fat Mama" (Evans/Powell/Upchurch)/(Hancock) – 11:04
18. "Anyday" (Clapton/Whitlock) – 7:54
19. "Maybe Your Baby" (Wonder) – 7:01
20. "Up Above My Head" (Tharpe) – 5:42

== Personnel ==
- Derek Trucks – guitars
- Kofi Burbridge – keyboards, flute, backing vocals
- Todd Smallie – bass, backing vocals
- Yonrico Scott – drums, percussion, backing vocals
- Count M'Butu – congas, percussion
- Mike Mattison – lead vocals

== Production and Crew ==
- Blake Budney – executive producer, management
- John Carlo Vernile – executive producer
- Hank Lena – director
- Evan Haiman – producer
- Sarah Iversen – associate producer
- Marty Wall – live sound engineer
- Mike Konopka – audio engineer
- Jay Joyce – audio mixing
- Mike Paragone – audio mixing
- John "Digger" Peleaz – audio finishing
- Ray Volkema – editing
- Andrew Mendelson – audio mastering at Georgetown Masters (Nashville, Tennessee)
- Chris Edwards – tour manager
- Bobby Tis – stage manager, technician
- Brad Mackie – lighting director
- William "IGGY" Ingoglia – lighting programmer
- Jeff Wood – set designer
- Bobby Bolton – coach operator
- Josh Cheuse – art direction, design
- Adam Farber – photography
- Julie Orlin – stylist
- Nicole Lund – management assistant
- Wayne Forte – booking
- Marc Ryan – bonus footage interview editing
- Marty Shulman – bonus footage
