= The Derek Trucks Band =

American rock and blues band (1994–2010)

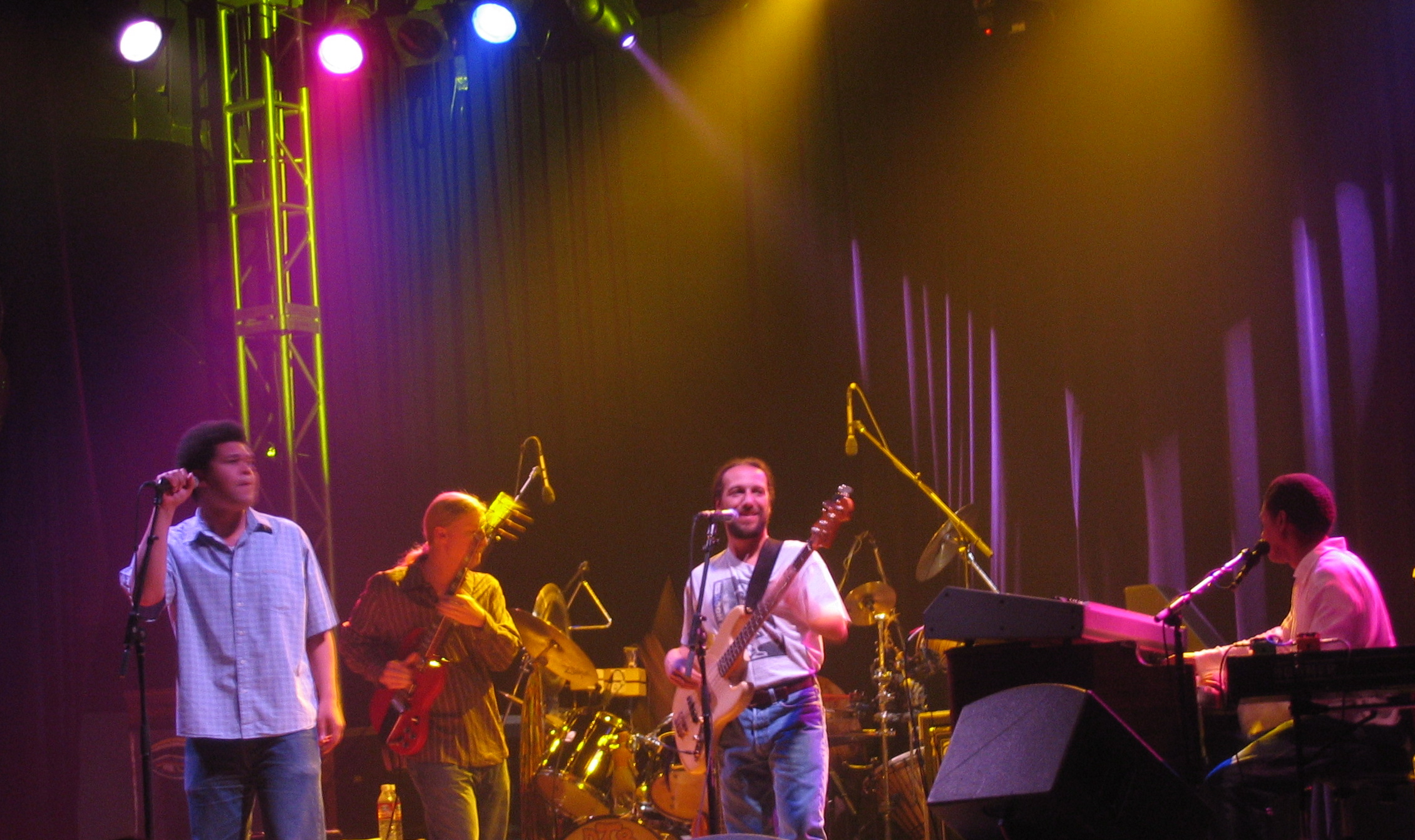
- The Derek Trucks Band performing in 2005. L to R: Mattison, Trucks, Smallie, Burbridge (Scott, rear)

Background information
- Origin: Jacksonville, Florida, U.S.
- Genres: Southern rock; blues rock; jazz rock; world music; jam band
- Years active: 1994–2010
- Labels: Columbia, Legacy, House of Blues
- Spinoffs: Tedeschi Trucks Band
- Past members: Derek Trucks; Todd Smallie; Mike Mattison; Bill McKay; Javier Colon; Kofi Burbridge; Yonrico Scott; Count M'Butu
- Website: www.derekandsusan.net, The Derek Trucks Band.com

The Derek Trucks Band was an American musical group from Jacksonville, Florida, formed in 1994 by guitarist Derek Trucks and bassist Todd Smallie.

Best known for Trucks' distinctive slide guitar style, the band's diverse sound blends blues, rock, and jazz with more exotic influences such as qawwali, afrobeat, and Hindustani classical music. Their lineup has rotated over the years, with Trucks and Smallie as constants; other longtime members include drummer Yonrico Scott, keyboardist Kofi Burbridge, and lead vocalist Mike Mattison.

The band has released six studio albums, the last of which, Already Free (2009), won the 2010 Grammy Award for Best Contemporary Blues Album.

The Derek Trucks Band disbanded in 2010, when Trucks, Mattison, and Burbridge joined Trucks' wife, singer and guitarist Susan Tedeschi, to form the Tedeschi Trucks Band.

== History ==
The Derek Trucks Band was founded by Trucks in 1994, with the introduction of Todd Smallie, an Atlanta jazz and blues-based musician playing bass guitar. As the first to join him, Trucks has said he feels that he's "kind of grown up with him."

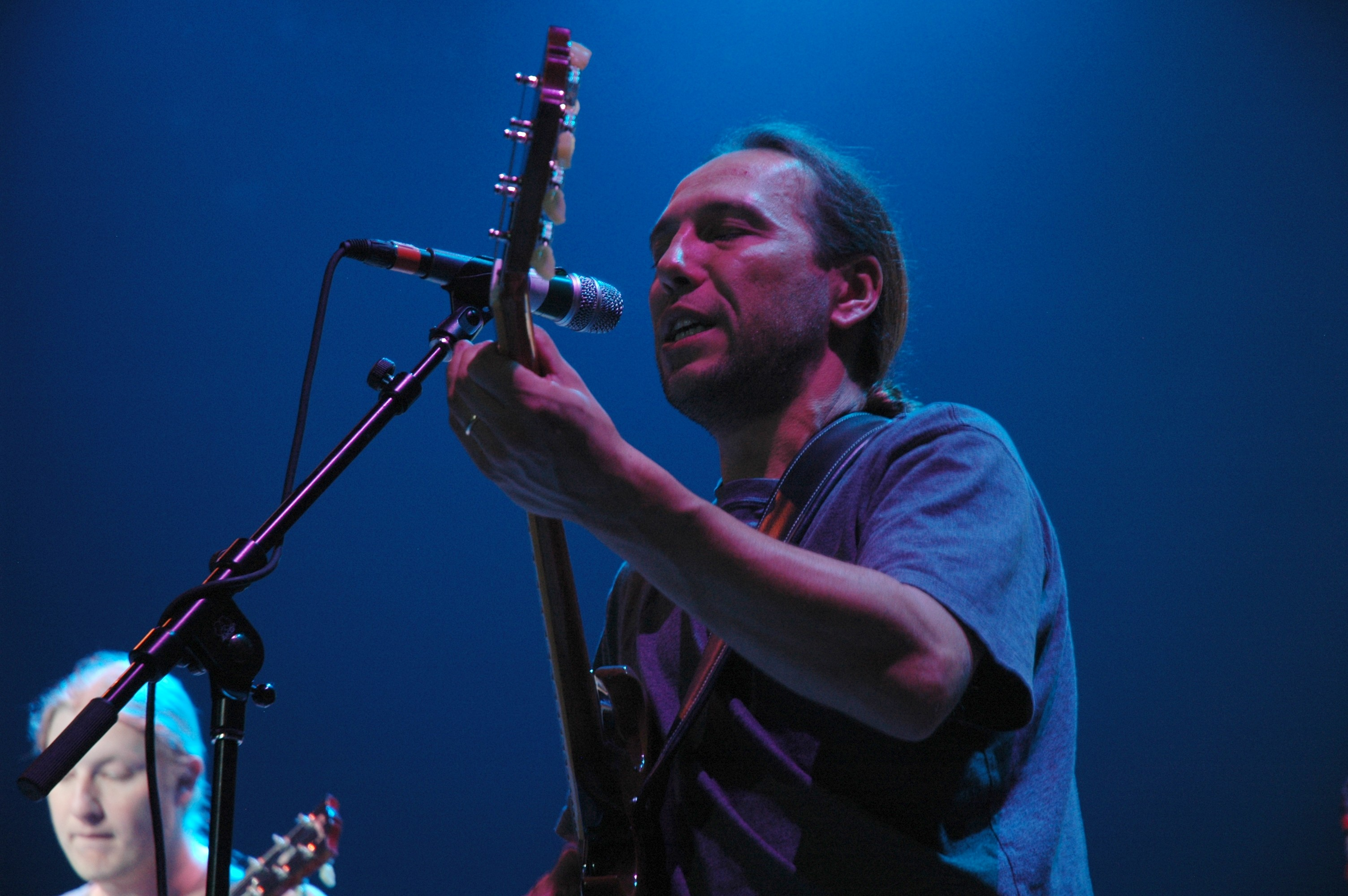
Trucks, left; Todd Smallie, bassist

The next year, in 1995, Smallie was followed by drummer Yonrico Scott, who initially filled the role of percussionist, as well as drummer, completing the band's first cohesive rhythm section. Scott began learning to play the drums when still a very young child. Originating in Michigan, with a Motown influence, he graduated from the University of Kentucky with a B.A. Degree in percussion performance. His songwriting collaborations with other band members appeared from their first eponymous debut album in 1997, followed by Out of the Madness in 1999, and have continued to date. Scott has been playing with Trucks for over 17 years as of 2009. According to Trucks: "We've developed a kind of 'musical ESP'.. it's nice to have somebody that you don't have to look at...he's just right there with you."

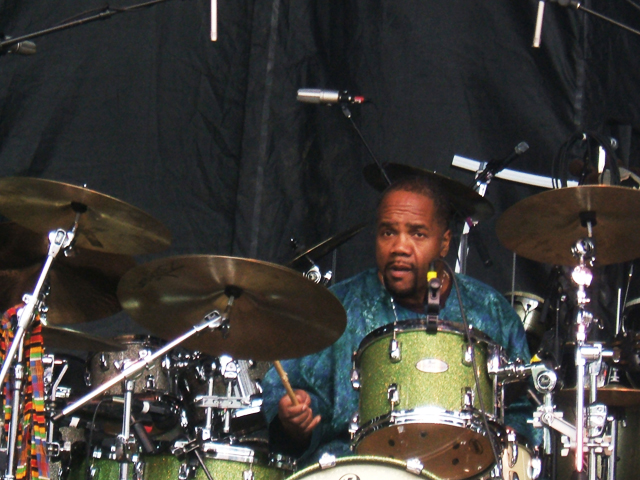
Yonrico Scott, on drums

Trucks continued to gather a steady group of talented musicians together, although two early members did not last. The band's initial keyboardist/vocalist, Bill McKay, left his mark in songwriting credits on the band's earliest albums.

Upon finding an opening for a keyboardist, the bandmates felt fortunate to find Kofi Burbridge, (brother of bass guitarist Oteil Burbridge, with whom Trucks plays in the Allman Brothers Band) to fill the role. Kofi Burbridge is a classically trained multi-instrumentalist, and he contributed to his versatility with keyboards, organ, flute, and backing vocals, in addition to his songwriting. Burbridge joined the band in 1999. In an interview upon the release of their 2002 album, Joyful Noise, Trucks commented "Kofi Burbridge has been with us maybe 2-3 years, and he's one of the few musical geniuses that I've had the chance to work with..." continuing, "I'm really anxious to see in the next few years to see where he takes this, because he's definitely a huge part of what's going on right now."

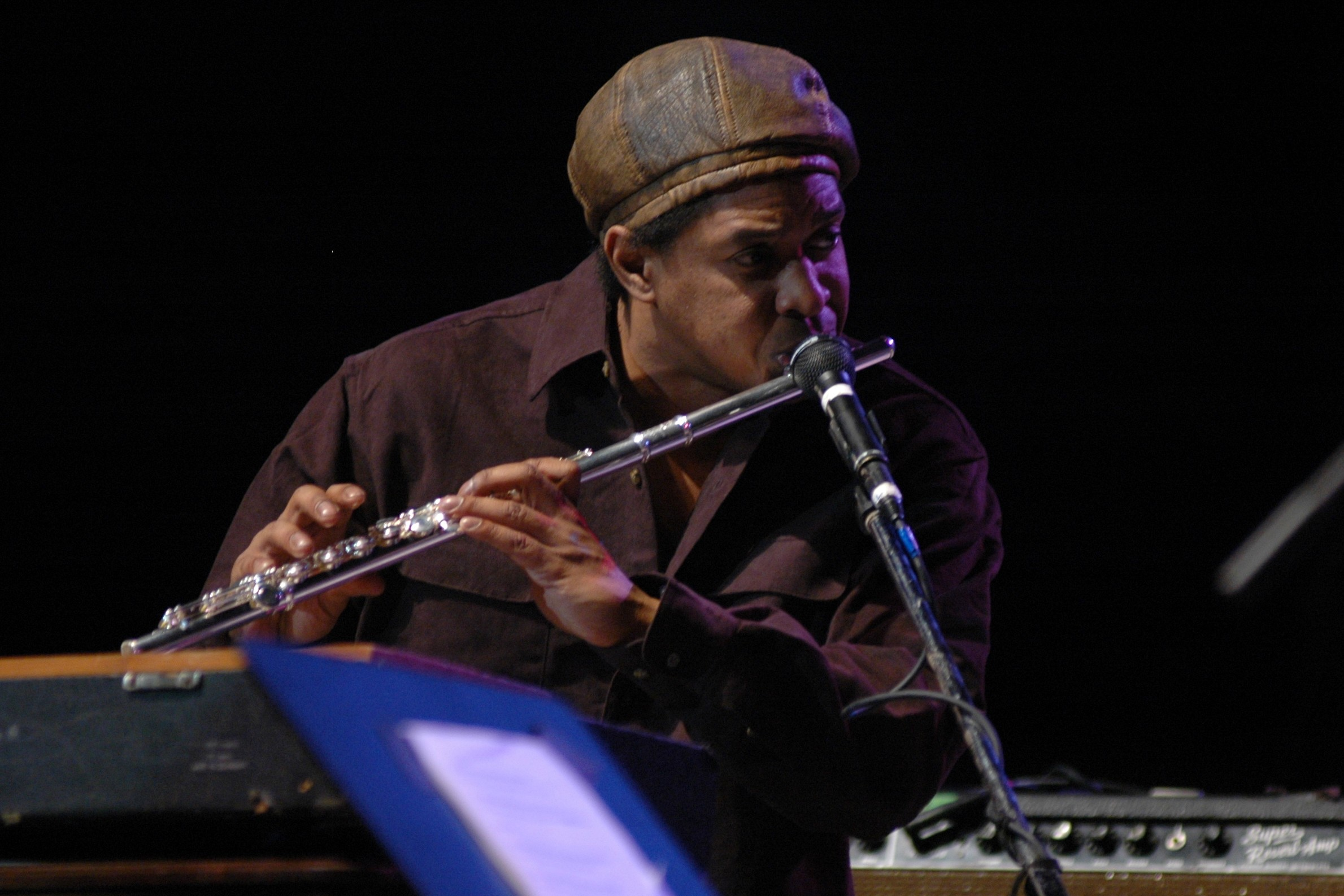
Kofi Burbridge Flute and Keyboards

In 2002 the band's producers, Craig Street and John Snyder recommended singer Mike Mattison to the band.

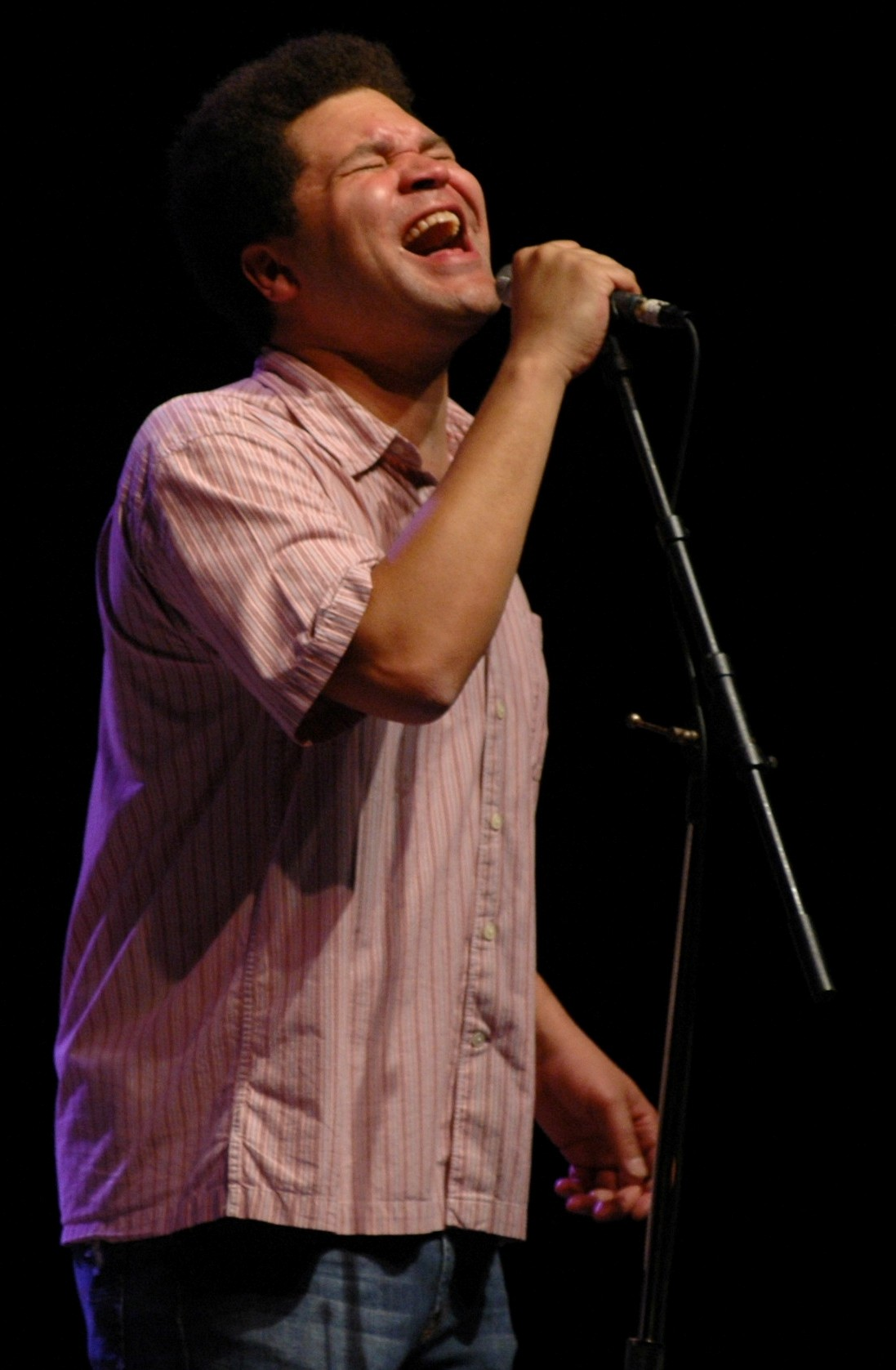
Mattison, Lead Vocalist

Mattison performed several shows with the band, and Trucks decided Mattison's soulful voice and calm stage presence completed the band's identity. Trucks said of Mattison, "He's got a huge range, so that helps us out a lot when we stretch into some of the different material we cover. It's like having three different vocalists onstage at times. It's a tough piece of the puzzle to find, you know -- a good singer who fits with what you're doing -- so we were very fortunate to hook up with Mike."

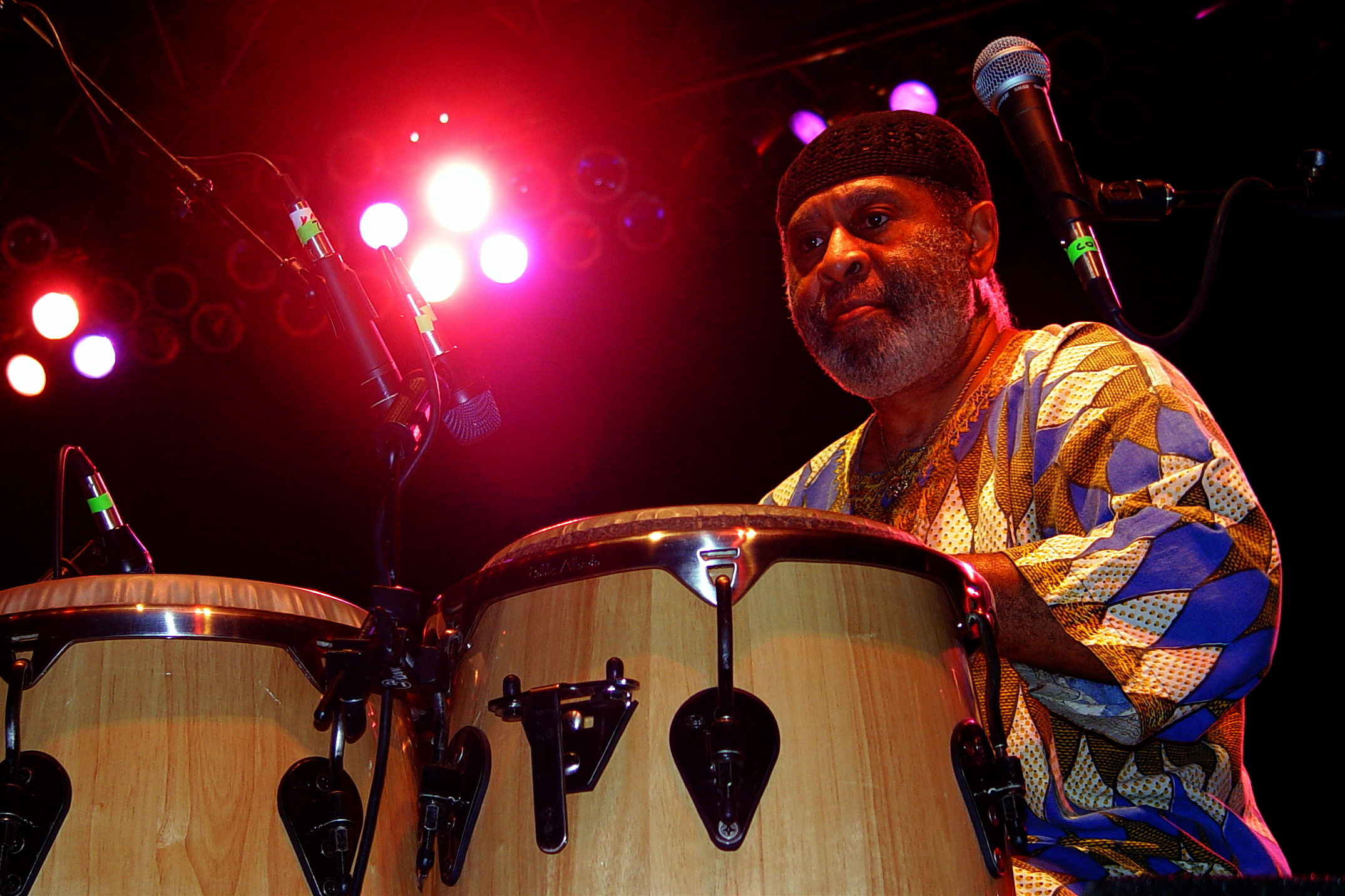
Count M’Butu, Percussionist

Mattison has collaborated with Trucks writing songs, on each album since joining the band, including the title track to the band's 2008 album, Already Free. Mattison had a previous band as well—a vocal duo, called Scrapomatic, with guitarist/vocalist Paul Olsen, with whom he still performs at occasional gigs, including some opening sets for The Derek Trucks Band.

The band's final member, Count M'Butu was the only band member that did not appear on every tour. M'Butu, the group's eldest member, played a variety of drums and percussion. Trucks and Scott both have known him for decades, before he joined the Derek Trucks Band, as M'Butu was a regular musical fixture in Atlanta; one of the bastions of the Allman Brothers fan bases. Thus, as of early 2009, M'Butu was the eldest member of the band, which has members whose ages are in their 20s, 30s 40s 50s and 60s. M'Butu has a great deal of African influence in his work, but lived in Sandersville, Georgia most of his life, "so he's got that Southern thing, too", Trucks concluded. His differing influences are compatible with the band's world music sound.

Since the last members joined in 2002, the bandmates have adjusted to near-constant travelling on the road, and have become comfortable with one another. Each member's experiences, tastes, and differing approaches to each piece are a bonus, says Mattison. Since the band embraces improvisation and musical exploration, he has said, "You're just part of the ensemble -- you do your bit and step back and let everybody else do theirs. It's fun to not have to carry the weight of the entertainer."

The band's album, Already Free, won the Grammy Award for Best Contemporary Blues Album at the 52nd Grammy Awards. That summer they released their live album, Roadsongs. In 2011, the band got a Blues Music Award as Band of the Year.

The Derek Trucks Band would occasionally play together with the band of Trucks' wife, Susan Tedeschi, in a collective known as "Soul Stew Revival". This allowed the couple to spend more time with each other when they would otherwise both be out on the road separately. Trucks and Tedeschi formed a new group called the Tedeschi Trucks Band, with Mike Mattison and Kofi Burbridge both joining from the Derek Trucks Band. As a result, the Derek Trucks Band has been on hiatus since 2010. Kofi Burbridge and Yonrico Scott both died in 2019. Count M'Butu died in 2021.

== Personnel ==
Current members

- Derek Trucks – Guitar, slide guitar, sarod, dobro (1994–present)
- Todd Smallie – bass backing vocals (1994–present)
- Mike Mattison – lead vocals (2002–present)

Former members

- Yonrico Scott – drums, percussion, vocals (1995–2019; his death)
- Kofi Burbridge – keyboards, flute, vocals (1999–2019; his death)
- Bill Mckay – keyboards, vocals (1995–1999)
- Javier Colon – lead vocals (2000–2002)
- Count M'Butu – percussion, including a variety of drums (2004–2021; his death)

== Discography ==
- The Derek Trucks Band (1997)
- Out of the Madness (1998)
- Joyful Noise (2002)
- Soul Serenade (2003)
- Live at Georgia Theatre (2004)
- Songlines (2006)
- Songlines Live (2006, DVD)
- Already Free (2009)
- Roadsongs (2010)
