= Five by Five (Rolling Stones EP) =

EP by the Rolling Stones
- Released: 14 August 1964
- Recorded: 11 June 1964
- Studio: Chess, Chicago
- Genre: Rock
- Length: 12:49
- Label: Decca
- Producer: Andrew Loog Oldham

The Rolling Stones chronology
The Rolling Stones (1964)	Five by Five (1964)	The Rolling Stones No. 2 (1965)

Five by Five is the second EP by the Rolling Stones and was released in 1964. Captured during a prolific spurt of recording activity at Chess Studios in Chicago that June, Five by Five was released that August in the UK shortly after their debut album, The Rolling Stones, had appeared. The title of Five by Five is a play on words—five tracks recorded by a band with five members.

== History ==
Because Mick Jagger and Keith Richards were still honing their songwriting skills, only "Empty Heart" and "2120 South Michigan Avenue" were credited to "Nanker Phelge", a pseudonym for band-written compositions. The rest of the EP is composed of R&B covers from some of their favorite artists. Andrew Loog Oldham produced Five by Five and even contributed liner notes where he lists the band's achievements thus far (and stretches the truth by claiming the Rolling Stones' debut album had spent 30 weeks at No. 1 when it, in fact, was at the top for 12).

The full recording of "2120 South Michigan Avenue", now heard on the remastered 12 X 5, was faded early here for lack of time available on a conventional EP in 1964.

== Release and reception ==
Professional ratings
Review scores
Source	Rating
AllMusic	4/5 stars

Five by Five reached number one in the UK EP chart, while its five tracks and namesake would form the basis for their second American album, 12 X 5, later in 1964.

In his book The Rolling Stones: An Illustrated History, British rock critic Roy Carr wrote that "along with the Beatles' Long Tall Sally four-tracker, 5 X 5 is unquestionably the first and last great EP."

Five by Five was reissued on CD in 2004 on the Singles 1963–1965 box set through ABKCO Records. In November 2010, it was made available as part of a limited edition vinyl box set titled The Rolling Stones 1964-1969, by itself digitally at the same time, and in 2011 as part of the 60's UK EP Collection digital compilation.

On 20 April 2013, the EP was reissued on 7-inch vinyl record as a part of Record Store Day 2013.

== Track listing ==
Side one

1. "If You Need Me" (Wilson Pickett/Robert Bateman/Sonny Sanders) – 2:03
2. "Empty Heart" (Nanker Phelge) – 2:37
3. "2120 South Michigan Avenue" (Nanker Phelge) – 2:07

Side two

1. "Confessin' the Blues" (Jay McShann/Walter Brown) – 2:48
2. "Around and Around" (Chuck Berry) – 3:05

== Personnel ==
The Rolling Stones

- Mick Jagger – lead vocals, tambourine, harmonica
- Keith Richards – guitar and backing vocals
- Brian Jones – guitar, backing vocals, and harmonica
- Bill Wyman – bass guitar
- Charlie Watts – drums
- Ian Stewart – organ and piano

== Cover versions ==
MC5 covered "Empty Heart". George Thorogood and the Destroyers covered "2120 South Michigan Avenue" on the album of the same name.
