= Levee Town (band) =

- Origin: Kansas City, Missouri, United States
- Genres: Blues rock
- Years active: 2002–present
- Members: Brandon Hudspeth; Jacque Garoutte; Adam Hagerman
- Past members: Jan Faircloth; Jimmie Meade
- Website: Official website

Levee Town is an American blues rock group, formed in 2002 in Kansas City, Missouri, United States. Over the past two decades, Levee Town have self-released eight albums, including their most recent collection, Trying to Keep My Head Above Water.

== Career ==
Levee Town was formed in 2002 by Brandon Hudspeth, Jimmie Meade, Jan Faircloth and Jacque Garoutte, all musicians with previous experience. Hudspeth (guitar, vocals) was born in Muskogee, Oklahoma, and previously played alongside Cal Collins and Clark Terry. After relocating to Kansas City, he backed many local musicians such as Lee McBee. Meade (harmonica, vocals) was from Chicago, Illinois, and was educated at the Old Town School of Folk Music, studying with Joe Filisko. Later moving to Lawrence, Kansas, he also studied with Lee McBee, before moving on to Kansas City. Garoutte (bass guitar, vocals) has toured with both Randy McAllister and Smokin' Joe Kubek. Faircloth (percussion, vocals) moved to Kansas City in January 1999 from Garden City, Kansas. Levee Town self-released their debut album, Exit Here, in 2003. This was followed by a live album, Snapshot (2005). In 2006, the band issued its second studio based recording, Unstable Table, which one reviewer noted "displayed a strong penchant for solid songwriting and inventive lyrics". The band twice represented the Kansas City Blues Society in the International Blues Challenge, in Memphis, Tennessee, being placed in the top ten in 2009. The same year, the band's next album, Levee Town, was released.

Pages of Paperwork (2011) was the final album issued by the band's original line-up. The collection contained fourteen tracks, thirteen of them written by Brandon Hudspeth and Jacque Garoutte, plus one penned by Jimmie Meade. Following a fallow period and a change in the band's line-up, the next recording was Takin' & Givin' (2016), which was their sixth album. Slimmed down to a trio, Levee Town now comprised Hudspeth, Garoutte, and Adam Hagerman on drums. The album was released on June 3, 2016, with Hudspeth and Garoutte penning all but one of the collection's tracks. The exception was "I'm a Damn Good Time", written by the Oklahoma Jazz Hall of Fame inductee, Ace Moreland. Takin and Givin' charted on the Roots Music Report listings. In 2019, City Hall, was the trio's next recorded work.

In 2022, the band released their eight album, Trying to Keep My Head Above Water. That same year, Levee Town were nominees for a Blues Blast Music Award in the 'Rock Blues Album' category. On October 28, 2022, Trying to Keep My Head Above Water, was in the top 20 of the Roots Music Report's Top Blues Rock Album Chart for 2022.

== Band members ==
- Brandon Hudspeth : Guitar, vocals
- Jacque Garoutte : Bass guitar, vocals
- Adam Hagerman : Drums

== Discography ==
=== Albums ===
Year	Title	Label
2003	Exit Here	Self-released
2005	Snapshot (live album)	Self-released
2006	Unstable Table	Self-released
2009	Levee Town	Self-released
2011	Pages of Paperwork	Self-released
2016	Takin' and Givin'	Self-released
2019	City Hall	Self-released
2022	Trying to Keep My Head Above Water	Self-released
