= Jim Suhler =

American singer (born 1960)

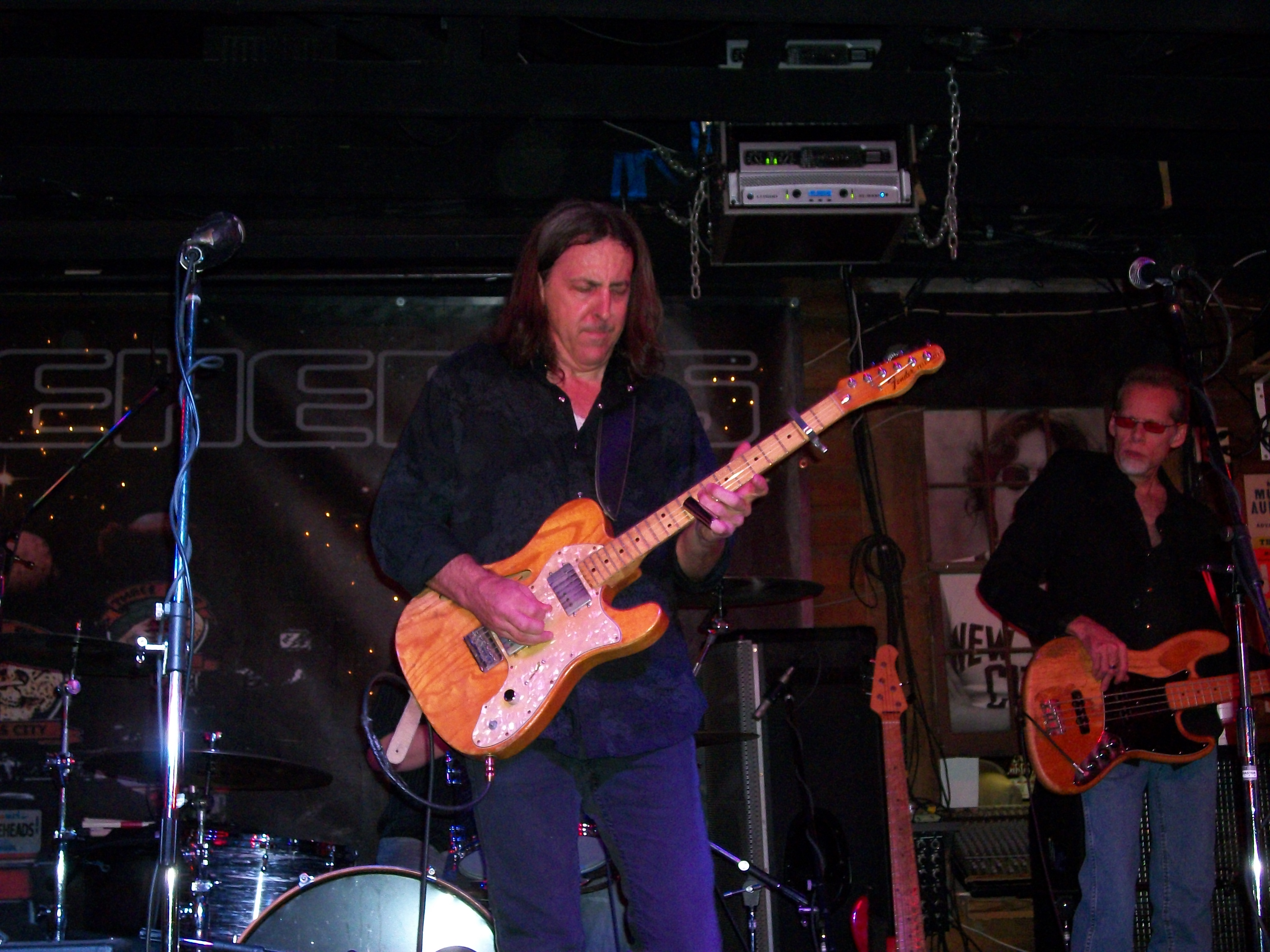
- Suhler performing in 2011

Background information
- Born: December 30, 1960 (age 65); Dallas, Texas United States
- Genres: Blues, rock and roll
- Occupations: Musician, songwriter, Bandleader, Record Producer
- Instruments: Vocals, guitar
- Years active: 1980–present
- Labels: EMI, Eagle, MCA, CMC, Lucky Seven, Topcat, Underworld, Continental Blue Heaven, Black Top, Pee Wee, Delta Groove, Easydisc
- Website: jimsuhler.com

Jim Suhler (born December 30, 1960, in Dallas, Texas, United States) is an American Texas blues guitarist. Suhler has been playing professionally since the 1980s and has performed with a variety of Blues musicians that include George Thorogood, Johnny Winter, AC/DC, Buddy Whittington, Billy F. Gibbons, Joe Bonamassa, Elvin Bishop, and Buddy Guy, along with many other notable musicians. He resides in Dallas, Texas, and plays locally in and around Texas' major cities, especially Dallas/Fort Worth with his own band, Jim Suhler & Monkey Beat, in addition to the remainder of the United States and also the majority of Canada.

He and his band have also gained a large following in Europe, particularly in the Netherlands, Denmark, Norway, England and Ireland.

The current Monkey Beat lineup includes: Shawn Phares on keyboards/accordion (joined in 2000); Patrick Smith on bass (joined in 2019); and Beau Chadwell on drums/percussion (joined in 2011). Former members include Jimmy Morgan & Paul Hollis (both on drums) and also Carlton Powell on bass guitar/vocals (co-founding member), and Christopher Alexander on bass guitar.

Since 1999, Suhler has been the Rhythm / Lead Guitarist for George Thorogood & The Destroyers on all the band's releases and tours.

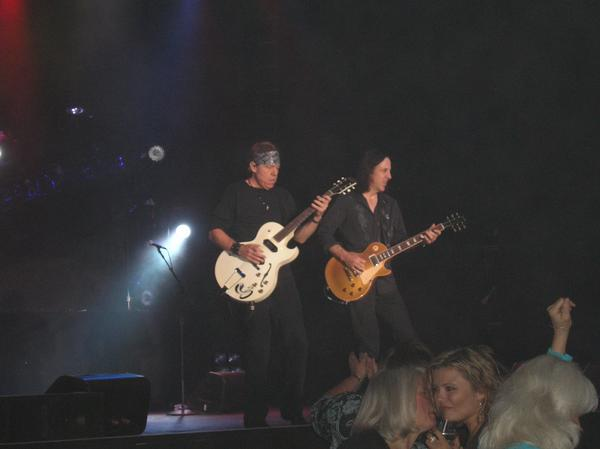
Suhler performing with George Thorogood at Crossroads, Kansas City, Missouri on August 20, 2010

== Early Life and Career Influences ==
Jim Suhler was born in Dallas, Texas on December 30, 1960. He grew up in the Lakewood area of Dallas, Texas and attended Hillcrest High School. His first exposure to music was by The Beatles, The Rolling Stones, and other British Invasion bands on Dallas AM top 40 radio station KLIF in the 1960s. His major influences at that point were Lynyrd Skynyrd, The Allman Brothers Band, ZZ Top, Johnny Winter, Led Zeppelin and Rory Gallagher among others. During these formative years, Suhler was exposed to Texas guitar talent performing in local North Texas nightclubs like Bugs Henderson, Stevie Ray Vaughan, Anson Funderburgh, Jimmie Vaughan and Rocky Hill. Suhler played in an array of forgotten cover and original bands during these years, initially backing other vocalists or guitarists. He knew at an early age he definitely wanted to be a musician (he started playing guitar at the age of 14) but it was not until a trip to Mississippi where he met Son Thomas, that he knew for certain that he wanted to play the blues. Suhler said of this visit, "He was really gracious – he let me come in and we played together. It was really special".

Suhler never had the privilege of sharing the stage with Stevie Ray Vaughan, but he did get the opportunity to meet the bluesman on a couple of occasions, initially in 1989 at his father's jewelry store in Dallas when Vaughan stopped in to have a watch repaired. When Suhler's father asked Vaughan if he had any advice for his musician son, his reply was "Yeah, keep it clean" – meaning stay clear of drugs, advice which Suhler took to heart. When Vaughan did not return to pick up the watch, Suhler decided to try to return it to him – "Vaughan was playing in Dallas at Fair Park, I take his watch to him, get backstage and he's very amused that I'm even there bringing him his watch—he was very polite, a very sweet, soft-spoken man. And I'm not big on vibes and auras and stuff like that but I swear on everything that's holy to me that when Stevie walked up to me he radiated a light, he had an aura about him. And I don't even like to say things like that because people say 'Yeah, sure' – but he was a big inspiration to me".

Suhler's first bar band was called Stray Kats. They played a few gigs in 1980 at St. Christopher's, one of Vaughan's Dallas venues at that time. Suhler played guitar for the hard rock band Overlord in 1985, playing Dallas' punk/underground venues including the Twilite Room, Theater Gallery and also Nairobi Room. Suhler then co-fronted the Road Hogs from 1986 to 1988, with harmonica player/vocalist Memo Gonzalez, recording a long lost 45rpm for Pee Wee Records, "Dogged & Driven b/w "Hot & Bothered". Suhler was playing a more traditional form of blues than he is now known for, reflecting the style of T-Bone Walker, Magic Sam and B. B. King. Following the demise of the Road Hogs, Suhler's next band was The Homewreckers. This lineup played together from 1989 to 1991, recording a cassette only release called "Hit It & Git It". It was during this period Suhler was a DJ at Dallas' KNON radio station, hosting a three-hour weekly blues show called Radio Mojo every Tuesday night (1987–1990).

== Monkey Beat / George Thorogood and The Destroyers ==
Monkey Beat performing at Knuckleheads Saloon in Kansas City, Missouri on July 11, 2010

While later playing a Homewreckers set at a Memphis, Tennessee club called Huey's, he was discovered by George Thorogood, eventually joining the Destroyers in 1999. Thorogood was impressed with Suhler's playing, arranging and songwriting skills, and consequently the two struck up a friendship. After the Homewreckers imploded in mid-1991, Suhler formed power trio Monkey Beat, with drummer Paul Hollis and bassist/vocalist Carlton Powell. At that time, Suhler sent a four-song demo to Thorogood's producer/engineer Terry Manning, after Thorogood told Suhler, "Terry would love you guys". Manning was impressed with Monkey Beat, agreeing to engineer and release an album on Manning's fledgling label, Lucky Seven Records. The albums Radio Mojo (1992) and Shake (1995) were the result of this initial collaboration. Several tours opening for Thorogood & the Destroyers across North America in 1993–95 followed. Thorogood also had Suhler appear with him on numerous radio shows and make in-store appearances with him to get Monkey Beat more exposure. Suhler became a full-time member of George Thorogood & The Destroyer's in 1999 and has appeared on every release by the band since then, playing rhythm/lead guitar, as well as co-writing some of the band's material.

In April of 2026, Jim was inducted as a Member of George Thorogood & The Destroyers into the Musicians Hall of Fame and Museum in Nashville, Tennessee alongside Nicky Hopkins, John Boylan (music producer), Dann Huff, Keith Urban, Michael McDonald (musician) and Dolly Parton.

After the recording of the Mike Morgan/Jim Suhler CD Let The Dogs Run, Monkey Beat went to the Compass Point Studios in Nassau, Bahamas to again record with Manning. Shake soon followed. For the next few years, Jim Suhler & Monkey Beat toured throughout the United States and Europe, playing clubs, theaters, and festivals for their fan base.

Bad JuJu, which was produced by Jim Gaines was the most fully realized Monkey Beat album to date, and released by Lucky Seven Records in 2001.

Tijuana Bible was released in 2009. It was recorded in Nashville with Tom Hambridge producing, and included guest artists Elvin Bishop, Jimmy Hall and Joe Bonamassa. Tijuana Bible included covers of tracks by Rory Gallagher, AC/DC, and Elvin Bishop, as well as 13 of Suhler's originals. The album was nominated for a Blues Music Award in the category of Best Blues-Rock Recording.

Panther Burn was released on February 18, 2014, on Underworld Records. Contributors to this album included Kim Wilson of The Fabulous Thunderbirds, Asleep at the Wheel's Ray Benson, Carolyn Wonderland and Jason Elmore. The album was nominated by Blues Blast magazine for Best Blues Rock Album for 2014.

Live At The Kessler Theater (produced by Suhler), featuring 16 tracks (including two new songs) was recorded at the historic theater in Dallas on November 28, 2015, and released on June 16, 2016, also on Underworld Records.

== Later career ==
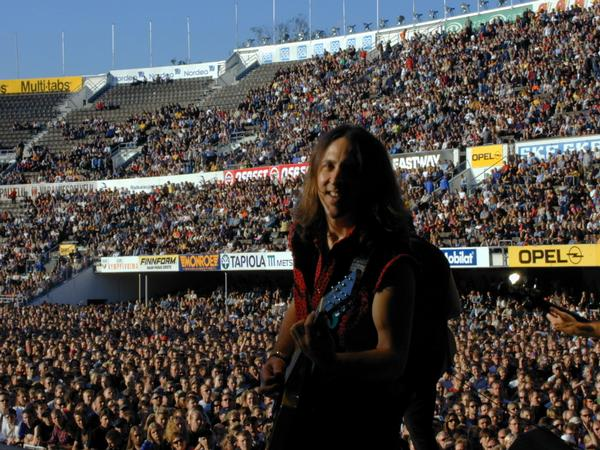
Suhler onstage performing with George Thorogood & The Destroyers – Opening for AC/DC in Helsinki, Finland 2002

Also on Suhler's resume is scoring the PBS documentary Larry vs. Lockney, and having his compositions used in major motion picture releases and television worldwide. In 2002, Suhler fulfilled a lifelong dream by playing two shows with AC/DC during their Stiff Upper Lip Tour, in Helsinki, Finland and Hamburg, Germany.

Suhler has also played publicly onstage with Les Paul, James Cotton, Hank Williams, Jr., Duke Robillard, Peter Wolf, Willie Nelson, Irma Thomas, Dr. John, Pinetop Perkins, Lazy Lester, Steve Miller, Elvin Bishop, Son Seals, The Fabulous Thunderbirds, Johnny Rivers, Joe Bonamassa, Cross Canadian Ragweed and others. Suhler also appears on the 2008 Elvin Bishop album, The Blues Rolls On.

Suhler co-produced an album in 2010 for another Texas-based blues band, Jason Elmore & Hoodoo Witch (Jason Elmore: lead guitar/vocals, Brandon Katona: bass, Mike Talbot: drums) entitled Upside Your Head, He also contributed consulting/performance work on Hoodoo Witch's second album, Tell You What, which was released on March 19, 2013. This album was nominated by Blues Blast magazine for Best Blues Rock Album for 2013.

On June 19, 2013, the Dallas Observer named Suhler number 4 on the list of "The 10 Greatest Dallas Blues Artists".

== Personal life ==
In 2002, Suhler and Lauri Miles were married by the "Reverend Willy G", aka Billy F Gibbons of ZZ Top in Houston, Texas. Gibbons became ordained in order to perform the ceremony and has subsequently married several other couples.

In 2007, Suhler had his divorce decree from the aforementioned wedding "blessed" by Texas humorist/writer/musician/politician, Kinky Friedman.

Also in 2002, Suhler's daughter Brittany was killed in an automobile accident. Suhler started the Brittany Suhler Memorial Foundation in her honor. The acoustically driven Dirt Road was released by Topcat Records later in the year, shortly after his daughter's death.

== Discography ==
Monkey Beat (denoted with *) and collaborations with other artists:

- Radio Mojo* (1993)
- Robert Ealey's If You Need Me (1995)
- Let The Dogs Run (1994) with Mike Morgan (Mike Buck on drums and Keith Ferguson on bass guitar)
- Shake* (February 7, 1995, Lucky Seven Records)
- Blues Guitar Duels (1997)
- Live at the Blue Cat Blues (Recorded in 1998, Released in 2000) with Alan Haynes
- Bad JuJu* (2001)
- Dirt Road (2002)
- Starvation Box* (2003)
- Elvin Bishop's The Blues Rolls On (2008)
- Jim Suhler & Monkey Beat at the Granada – Real Time Live in Texas* DVD (2008)
- Tijuana Bible* (2009) with Joe Bonamassa, Elvin Bishop The album was in 2010 for the Blues Music Award in the category of best blues-rock recording.
- Texas Scratch (2011) with Buddy Whittington, Vince Converse (Released June 2, 2023, in digital format only on Quarto Valley Records)
- Panther Burn* (2014) The album was nominated by Blues Blast magazine for Best Blues Rock Album for 2014.
- Live At The Kessler Theater* (2016)

With George Thorogood & The Destroyers:

- Live In '99 (1999)
- Ride 'Til I Die (2003)
- George Thorogood and the Destroyers: 30th Anniversary Live DVD (2004)
- The Hard Stuff (2006)
- The Dirty Dozen (2009)
- 2120 South Michigan Ave. (2011) Nominated for the Blues Music Award for "Best Rock Blues Album"
- Live At Montreux 2013 (2014)
