= Prime Blues =

Studio album by Jim Allchin
- Released: September 21, 2018
- Recorded: Blackbird Studios, Nashville, and Studio 3038, Seattle, Washington
- Genre: Blues rock
- Length: 52:40
- Label: Sandy Key Music LLC
- Producer: Tom Hambridge

Jim Allchin chronology
Decisions (2017)	Prime Blues (2018)	Costa Azul (2021)

Prime Blues is the fourth widely available studio album by American musician and computer scientist Jim Allchin. The release date of the album was September 21, 2018 by Sandy Key Music. The album contains 14 new contemporary blues songs. The front grill cover of the amplifier shown on the album artwork highlights all the prime numbers through one million.

== Reception ==
Prime Blues reached the No. 1 Top Blues Album on the Roots Music Report which tracks American Roots Music radio airplay in 2018. It entered the RMR charts on October 6, 2018, charting in at No. 35. Since Oct 13, 2018, Prime Blues has remained in the top 10 Blues Albums according to RMR and as of January 12, 2019 was the No. 2 Blues album and No. 1 Contemporary Blues album. As of May 20, 2019, Prime Blues has been on the Roots Music Report chart for 33 weeks. Even though released in September 2018, Prime Blues finished as the 16th most played Contemporary Blues album for 2018 according to RMR.

Prime Blues was a Silver Medal Winner in the Global Music Awards in 2018.

"Two Bad Dreams" from the Prime Blues won second place in the International Songwriting Competition in the Blues category from over 19,000 entries.

"Give It Up" the first track from Prime Blues was a finalist in the 2018 UK Songwriting Contest in the Jazz/Blues category.

Prime Blues was first reviewed September 6, 2018 by Rick Bowen and published in the NorthWest Music Scene magazine.

Album reviews especially noted Allchin's songwriting, musicianship, and guitar technique.

== Track listing ==
No.	Title	Writer(s)	Length
1.	"Give It Up"	Jim Allchin, Tom Hambridge	3:42
2.	"Devil Don't Sleep"	Jim Allchin, Tom Hambridge, Richard Fleming	3:12
3.	"Voodoo Doll"	Jim Allchin, Tom Hambridge, Richard Fleming	3:51
4.	"Snuggle Up"	Jim Allchin, Tom Hambridge, Richard Fleming	3:19
5.	"Jimmy's Boogie"	Jim Allchin	2:52
6.	"Summer Sunrise"	Jim Allchin, Tom Hambridge, Richard Fleming	4:51
7.	"Enough is Enough (feat. Mike Zito)"	Jim Allchin, Tom Hambridge, Richard Fleming	3:08
8.	"Found The Blues"	Jim Allchin	3:19
9.	"Two Bad Dreams (feat. Bobby Rush)"	Jim Allchin, Tom Hambridge, Richard Fleming	5:04
10.	"Pawn Shop Man"	Jim Allchin, Tom Hambridge, Richard Fleming	2:55
11.	"Lost My Mind"	Jim Allchin, Tom Hambridge, Richard Fleming	3:43
12.	"Up To Destiny"	Jim Allchin	4:26
13.	"Tech Blues"	Jim Allchin	4:06
14.	"Logoff"	Jim Allchin, Tom Hambridge, Richard Fleming	3:10

== Personnel ==
Musicians

- Jim Allchin – guitar, vocals, arrangements
- Bob Britt – rhythm guitar
- Kenny Greenberg – rhythm guitar
- Tom Hambridge – drums, percussion
- Kevin McKendree – keyboard
- Rob McNelley – rhythm guitar
- Glenn Worf – bass

Guest musicians

- Bobby Rush – vocal and harmonica on "Two Bad Dreams"
- Mycle Wastman – background vocals
- Mike Zito – vocal on "Enough Is Enough"
- The Memphis Horns – horns

Production

- Tom Hambridge – produced
- Ernesto Olvera-Lapier – tracking and mixing engineer engineering
- Zach Allen – engineering (Bobby Rush vocal and Harmonica solo) engineering
- Sean Badum (Studio D) – assistant engineer
- Jason Mott (Studio E) – assistant engineer
- Evan Nickels – project assistant
- Tommy MacDonald – project assistant
- John Heithaus – project executive
- The Switchyard – mixing and mastering
