= David Ramirez (musician) =

American singer-songwriter (born 1983)

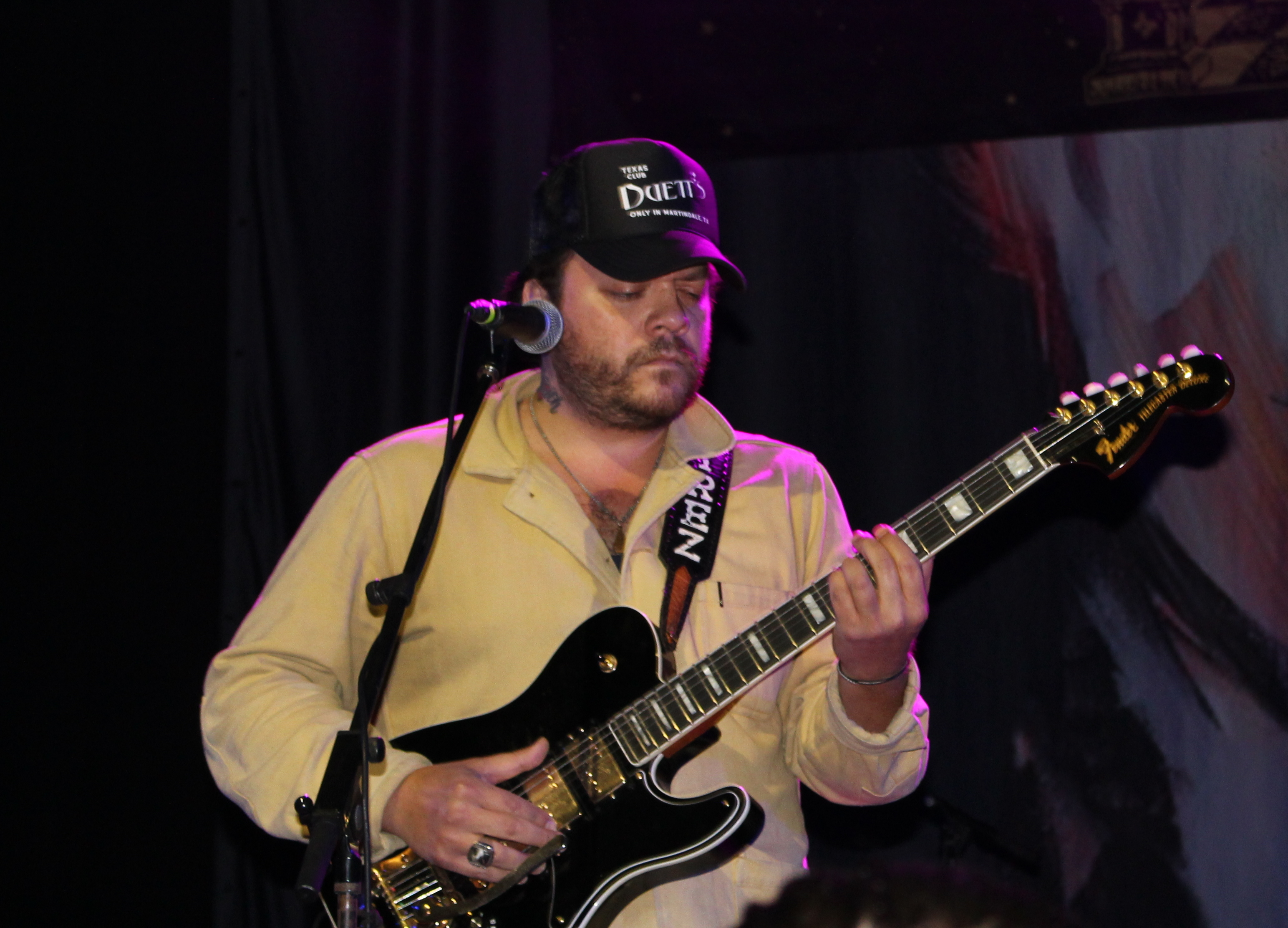
- At the Rialto Theatre, Tucson, Arizona in 2023

Background information
- Born: August 26, 1983 (age 43); Houston, Texas, U.S.
- Genres: Americana; Blues; Country folk; Contemporary folk music; Gospel; Indie folk
- Occupations: Singer-songwriter; Musician
- Website: davidramirezmusic.com

David Ramirez is an American Americana singer-songwriter based in Austin, Texas. Most of Ramirez music contain themes of sorrow, moral tribulation, love, and redemption. He is known for his deep and reverberant baritone voice. In 2020, he was awarded Songwriter of the Year by The Austin Chronicle.

== Early life ==
David Ramirez was born in Houston, TX, August 26, 1983, days after Hurricane Alicia made landfall. He dropped out of college to pursue his career in music.

== Career ==
Ramirez has released six full-length albums.

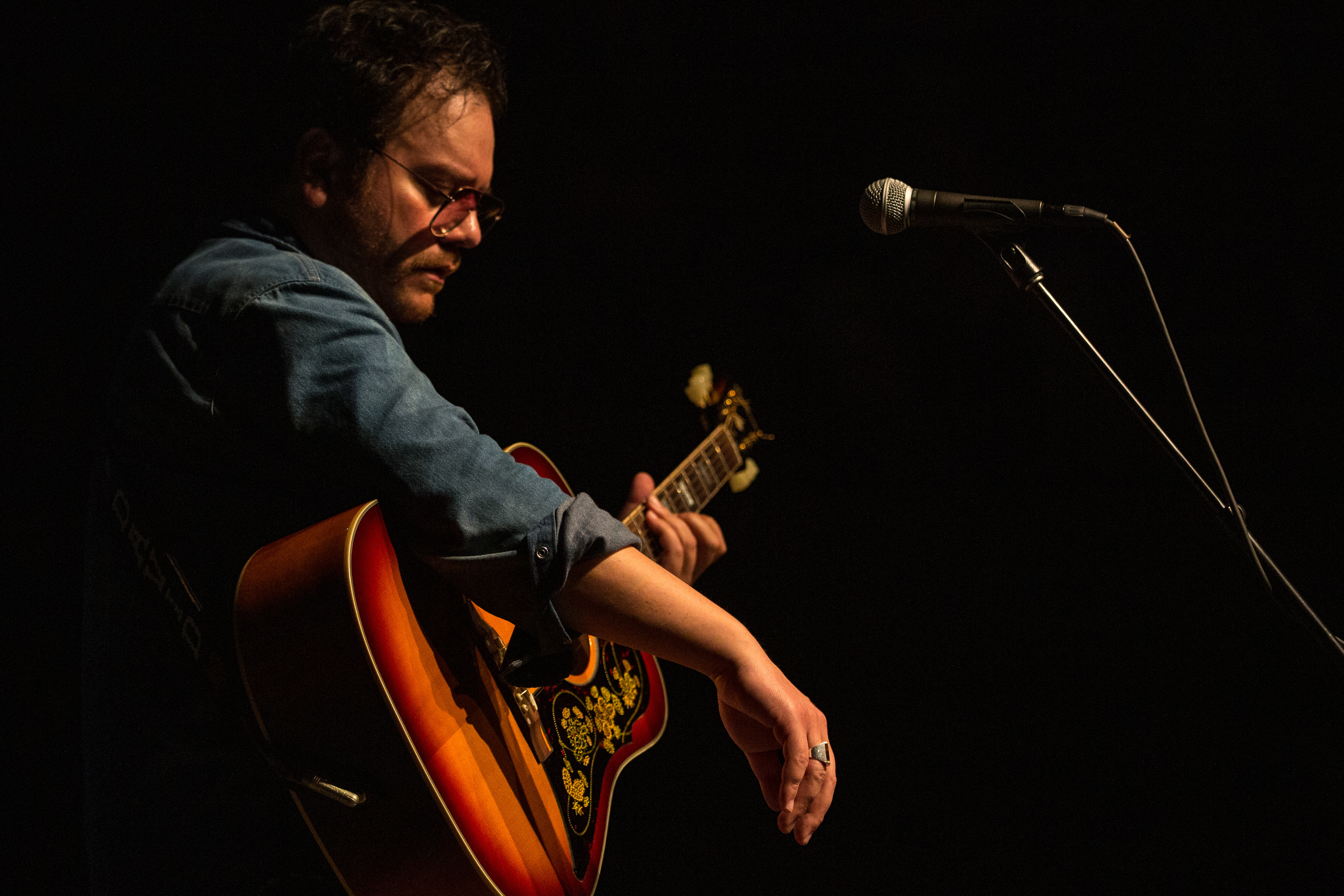
David Ramirez at the Kessler Theater, 2022.

In 2009, he self-released his first full-length album American Soil. In 2012, his second album Apologies was also self-released. The following four albums were released by Thirty Tigers.

The 2015 release of Fables received critical acclaim and was recorded in Seattle, produced by Noah Gundersen. In 2017, We're Not Going Anywhere was released, and produced by Sam Kassirer, who recorded the album at his studio in Maine. In 2020, My Love is a Hurricane was released and included a wider range of musical styles than his previous albums. Later that same year, Ramirez was awarded Songwriter of the Year by The Austin Chronicle.

In 2021, he signed with Red 11 Music, whose roster includes Turnpike Troubadours, Shooter Jennings, Old 97's, Jack Ingram and American Aquarium, among others. Later that year he released Backslider, a gospel album. In 2024, Ramirez announced a new album, All The Not So Gentle Reminders.

== Discography ==
Studio albums

- American Soil (2009, self-released)
- Apologies (2012, self-released)
- Fables (2015, Thirty Tigers)
- We're Not Going Anywhere (2017, Thirty Tigers)
- My Love is a Hurricane (2020, Thirty Tigers)
- Backslider (2021, Sweetworld)
- All The Not So Gentle Reminders (2025, Blue Corn Music)

EPs

- Strangetown – EP (2011, self-released)
- The Rooster – EP (2013, self-released)
- Rules & Regulations – EP (2022)

Collaborations

- Glorietta (2018, Bread & Butter) – Glorietta (w/Noah Gundersen, Matthew Logan Vasquez, Kelsey Wilson, Adrian Quesada, Jason Robert Blum).
