= Overclocked =

Overclocked may refer to:

- Overclocked: Stories of the Future Present, collection of short stories by Cory Doctorow
- Overclocked: A History of Violence, a 2008 video game
- Overclocked (album), a 2011 album by Jim Allchin
- OverClocked ReMix, a non-profit organization dedicated to preserving and paying tribute to video game music
- Overclocking, configuration of computer hardware to operate at a faster rate than certified by the manufacturer
