= Brian Holland =

American songwriter and record producer (born 1941)

- Born: February 15, 1941 (age 85); Detroit, Michigan, U.S.
- Genres: R&B; soul; funk
- Occupations: Producer; songwriter; arranger
- Years active: 1960s–present
- Labels: Motown; Invictus; Hallmark

Brian Holland (born February 15, 1941) is an American songwriter and record producer. He is the brother of songwriter and record producer Eddie Holland.

== Biography ==
=== Early life ===
Brian Holland was born in Detroit, Michigan. His older brother is Eddie Holland, a songwriter and producer with whom he has often collaborated.

=== Career ===
For a short time, Holland partnered with Robert Bateman, and together they were known as "Brianbert", collaborating on hits such as "Please Mr. Postman" for the Marvelettes, released in 1961 by Tamla Records.

He is best known as a member of Holland–Dozier–Holland, which consisted in the Holland brothers and Lamont Dozier, with Holland serving as the team's musical arranger and producer, and which was the Motown songwriting and production team responsible for much of the Motown sound and for numerous hit records by artists such as Martha and the Vandellas, the Supremes, the Four Tops, and the Isley Brothers. He has written or co-written 145 hits in US and 78 in the UK.

Holland has also had an on-and-off career as a performer. He released a solo single in 1958 under the name of "Briant Holland". He and his longtime friend and future songwriting partner Freddie Gorman were in a short-lived group called "the Fidalatones", and was also later (1960–62) a member of the Motown recording act the Satintones, as well as being a member of the "Rayber Voices", a quartet that backed up several early Motown recording acts.

Then, Holland released, under the name "Holland–Dozier", a lone single in 1963, "What Goes Up, Must Come Down" for Motown, but later was inactive for a number of years, and was revived in the early and mid-1970s, scoring a number of medium-sized R&B hits. He resumed his solo recording career in 1974, hitting the charts as a solo artist in 1974 and 1975.

=== Later life ===
Holland also composed songs for the First Wives Club musical, in 2009.

== Author ==
In 2019, Brian (along with brother Eddie and Dave Thompson) co-authored an autobiography of Holland–Dozier–Holland, entitled Come and Get These Memories, named after the hit single by Martha and the Vandellas.
