= 12 × 5 =

Studio album by the Rolling Stones
- Released: 17 October 1964
- Recorded: 25 February – 29 September 1964
- Studio: Chess, Chicago: Regent Sound, London
- Genre: Rock and roll; R&B; blues
- Length: 30:50
- Label: London, Decca, ABKCO
- Producer: Andrew Loog Oldham

The Rolling Stones American chronology
England's Newest Hit Makers (1964)	12 × 5 (1964)	The Rolling Stones, Now! (1965)

12 × 5 is the second American studio album by the English rock band the Rolling Stones, released in 1964 following the success of their American debut England's Newest Hit Makers. It is an expanded version of the EP Five by Five, which had followed their debut album in the UK.

The five songs on the British EP were fleshed out with seven additional tracks to bring the work to LP length. Among the additional tracks were the UK single-only release "It's All Over Now", a cover of a Bobby Womack song that was the group's first UK number one hit, an alternative version of "Time Is on My Side", which appears in a more familiar form on other albums, and three Jagger/Richards originals.

== Composition ==
The album, like its predecessor, largely features R&B covers. However, it also contains three compositions by the developing Mick Jagger/Keith Richards songwriting team, as well as two group compositions under the pseudonym "Nanker Phelge". 12 × 5 is notable for featuring the first, and less often heard, of the Stones' two versions of Jerry Ragovoy's "Time Is on My Side", with a prominent electronic organ instead of the better-known version's electric guitar.

"I loved everything about this album as a kid," recalled Joe Satriani. "It was those second-generation electric blues players that I loved, but I had no idea where they got that music from. It took my teenage years to discover that."

After sessions in Chicago in June 1964, the Stones' UK label Decca Records released the five-song EP Five by Five. Because EPs were never a lucrative format in the US, London Records – their American distributor at the time – spread its songs across an album, adding seven new recordings to create a release of 12 songs by five musicians, hence the album's title. The rest of the songs were singles "It's All Over Now" and "Time Is on My Side" with their B-sides, plus three that were later included on The Rolling Stones No. 2. Decca would use the same cover (minus the lettering) for the band's second UK album, The Rolling Stones No. 2, in early 1965.

== Critical reception ==
Professional ratings
Review scores
Source	Rating
AllMusic	5/5 stars
Entertainment Weekly	C+
The Rolling Stone Album Guide	5/5 stars
Tom Hull	A−
Encyclopedia of Popular Music	4/5 stars
MusicHound Rock	4/5 stars

The album was included in Robert Christgau's "Basic Record Library" of 1950s and 1960s recordings, published in Christgau's Record Guide: Rock Albums of the Seventies (1981).

== Remastered version ==
In August 2002, 12 × 5 was reissued in a new remastered CD and SACD digipak by ABKCO Records. This edition includes stereo versions of "Around and Around", "Confessin' the Blues", "Empty Heart", "It's All Over Now", an extended version of "2120 South Michigan Avenue", and "If You Need Me".

== Track listing ==
Side one
No.	Title	Writer(s)	Length
1.	"Around and Around*" (originally released on the Five by Five EP)	Chuck Berry	3:03
2.	"Confessin' the Blues*" (originally released on the Five by Five EP)	Jay McShann, Walter Brown	2:46
3.	"Empty Heart*" (originally released on the Five by Five EP)	Nanker Phelge	2:35
4.	"Time Is on My Side (US single version)"	Norman Meade	2:50
5.	"Good Times, Bad Times"	Mick Jagger, Keith Richards	2:32
6.	"It's All Over Now*"	Bobby Womack, Shirley Womack	3:27
Total length:			17:13

Side two
No.	Title	Writer(s)	Length
1.	"2120 South Michigan Avenue*" (originally released on the Five by Five EP)	Nanker Phelge	2:03
2.	"Under the Boardwalk"	Arthur Resnick, Kenny Young	2:48
3.	"Congratulations"	Mick Jagger, Keith Richards	2:28
4.	"Grown Up Wrong"	Mick Jagger, Keith Richards	2:04
5.	"If You Need Me*" (originally released on the Five by Five EP)	Robert Bateman, Wilson Pickett	2:03
6.	"Susie Q"	Eleanor Broadwater, Stan Lewis, Dale Hawkins	1:51
Total length:			13:17

Note

- The 2002 CD edition features an extended version of "2120 South Michigan Avenue", at 3:41. The marked tracks are in true stereo on a rare later issue UK Decca EP and on the ABKCO 2002 CD.

== Personnel ==
=== The Rolling Stones ===
- Mick Jagger – lead vocals, harmonica, güiro
- Keith Richards – acoustic and electric guitar, backing vocals
- Brian Jones – electric and acoustic guitar, harmonica, tambourine, maracas, backing vocals
- Charlie Watts – drums
- Bill Wyman – bass guitar, backing vocals, triangle

=== Additional musicians ===
- Ian Stewart – piano, organ

== Charts ==
Chart (1964–1965)	Peak position
Australian Albums (Kent Music Report)	2
US Billboard 200	3

== Certifications ==
Region	Certification	Certified units/sales
United States (RIAA)	Gold	500,000^{^}
^{^} Shipments figures based on certification alone.
