= Q.E.D. (Jim Allchin album) =

Studio album by Jim Allchin
- Released: September 10, 2013
- Recorded: 2013 at Studio X. Rogue Island Studios, The Church, and Studio 3038, Seattle, Washington
- Genre: Blues rock
- Length: 47:58
- Label: Sandy Key Music LLC
- Producers: Jim Allchin, Ben Smith, Eric Oz

Jim Allchin chronology
Overclocked (2011)	Q.E.D. (2013)	Decisions (2017)

Q.E.D. is the second widely available studio album by American blues rock musician and computer scientist Jim Allchin. It was released on September 10, 2013 by Sandy Key Music. The title of the album is a reference to quod erat demonstrandum or Q.E.D which is sometimes used to denote the completion of a mathematical proof.

== Reception ==
Q.E.D. received widespread positive comments and ratings by reviewers—including "Q.E.D. is a guitar player’s dream, but it also showcases Jim Allchin’s songwriting and vocal gifts as well. They’ll be talking about this one for a while in the guitar magazines.", "There are many gifted artists in the world but there are a very few who reach this level.", "In translation, “Q. E. D." is Latin for "that which must be proved. As for Jim Allchin, he’s got absolutely nothin’ left to prove as a bluesman. And, in the world of contemporary blues, we’ll close with another well-turned phrase that explains Jim best–“Veni Vidi Vici"—he came, he saw, and he conquered!", "...a brilliant collection of music exposing the talent of Allchin", "He reminds me a bit of Robben Ford with his vocals and his amazing dexterity on the six-string. Microsoft's loss is the blues world's gain. This one is a keeper.", "I have listened to an album over the last few days that i think is one of the best blues albums of the year, Q.E.D. by Jim Allchin. ", "I remember the first time I heard Stevie Ray Vaughan. All I could think was, man, that's some guitar! The first time I heard Jim Allchin, ditto. Maybe he isn't Stevie Ray Vaughan, but he's Jim Allchin all over the freakin' place and I figure if you have a love for the rockin' side of R&B and rock 'n' roll, you'll feel the same. Allchin can play! I know you've heard it before, but he's a step beyond. I swear. You love jammin' guitar, you have got to hear this guy."

== Track listing ==
No.	Title	Writer(s)	Length
1.	"Stop and Go"	Jim Allchin	3:06
2.	"Getting Old"	Jim Allchin	3:19
3.	"Chime Blues"	Jim Allchin	3:20
4.	"Reap What You Sow"	Jim Allchin	3:35
5.	"Trust Me Feat. Mycle Wastman"	Jim Allchin	3:57
6.	"Thinking of You"	Jim Allchin	4:06
7.	"Trash"	Jim Allchin	3:16
8.	"Runnin Away"	Jim Allchin	3:48
9.	"Tried and True"	Jim Allchin	3:33
10.	"Drownin"	Jim Allchin	5:01
11.	"Evil Minded Woman"	Jim Allchin	4:41
12.	"Come on Home"	Jim Allchin	3:18
13.	"No Way Out"	Jim Allchin	2:57

== Personnel ==
Musicians

- Jim Allchin – guitar, vocals, arrangements
- Ben Smith – drums, percussion
- Dan Dean – bass
- Brooke Lizotte – keyboard

Guest musicians

- Mycle Wastman – vocals on "Trust Me"
- Keely Whitney – vocals on "Gettin Old"
- Martin Ros, Mycle Wastman, Keely Whitney – background vocals
- Owen Gurry – strings
- New York Brass – horns

Production

- Ben Smith – production assistance, engineering
- Eric Oz – production assistance, engineering, mixing
- Reed Ruddy, Andrew Ching, Andy Park, Gary Lodge, Eric janko – engineering
- Jay Franco – mastering, Sterling Sound, New York
