= Ride 'Til I Die =

Studio album by George Thorogood and the Destroyers
- Released: March 25, 2003
- Recorded: 2002
- Studio: Rumbo Recorders
- Genre: Blues rock; Boogie rock
- Length: 47:03
- Label: Eagle
- Producer: Jim Gaines, Delaware Destroyers

George Thorogood and the Destroyers chronology
Half a Boy/Half a Man (1999)	Ride 'Til I Die (2003)	The Hard Stuff (2006)

Singles from Ride 'Til I Die
- 1. "You Don't Love Me, You Don't Care" Released: 2003; 2. "American Made" Released: 2003

Ride 'Til I Die is the twelfth studio album by American blues rock band George Thorogood and the Destroyers. It was released on March 25, 2003 by the label Eagle Records. The album peaked at No. 2 on the Billboard Top Blues Album chart. Ride 'Til I Die is the final Destroyer's album to feature Hank "Hurricane" Carter, a 23-year member of the band.

== Recording ==
The album was recorded in early 2002, and produced by Jim Gaines. The title track was recorded at a soundcheck before a show in Texas on April 26, 2002.

== Release ==
Eagle Records released Ride 'Til I Die on March 25, 2003. The album peaked at No. 2 on the Billboard Top Blues Album chart, and No. 49 on the Billboard Top Independent Albums chart. "You Don't Love Me, You Don't Care," and "American Made" were released as singles. The Destroyers toured the US and UK in support of the album.

== Critical reception ==
Ride 'Til I Die received generally positive reviews from critics.

Professional ratings
Review scores
Source	Rating
AllMusic	3.5/5 stars
Classic Rock	7/10 stars

AllMusic's Tim Sendra says that "Thorogood's strength will always be good-time blooze 'n' boogie, he can do a credible job on acoustic blues too. The sound of the Ride 'Til I Die album is not a surprise; the surprise is that the record is as good as it is."

George Thorogood considers Ride 'Til I Die the and Born to Be Bad the best albums he ever made.

== Track listing ==
Ride 'Til I Die Track Listing
No.	Title	Writer(s)	Length
1.	"Greedy Man"	Eddie Shaw	3:21
2.	"American Made"	Charlie Midnight, Steve Hunter	4:06
3.	"Sweet Little Lady"	George Thorogood, Jim Suhler	3:50
4.	"Don't Let the Bossman Get You Down"	Elvin Bishop	2:50
5.	"Devil in Disguise"	J. J. Cale	3:10
6.	"She's Gone"	Theodore Roosevelt "Hound Dog" Taylor	3:44
7.	"The Fixer"	Richard Fleming, Tom Hambridge	3:19
8.	"You Don't Love Me, You Don't Care"	Ellas McDaniel	3:50
9.	"My Way"	Eddie Cochran, Jerry Capehart	2:53
10.	"That's It, I Quit"	Nick Lowe	2:37
11.	"I Washed My Hands In Muddy Water"	Joe Babcock	4:20
12.	"Move It"	Chuck Berry	4:47
13.	"Ride 'Til I Die"	John Lee Hooker, Jules Taub	4:07
Total length:			47:03

== Personnel ==
=== Musicians ===
- George Thorogood – rhythm guitar, slide guitar, vocals
- Jim Suhler – lead guitar
- Bill Blough – bass
- Jeff Simon – drums
- Hank Carter – saxophone, vocals

=== Technical ===
- Delaware Destroyers – producers
- Jim Gaines – producer
- Mike Donahue – executive producer
- Jeremy Blair – engineer
- Shawn Berman – engineer
- Leon Zervos – mastering
- John Hampton – mixing
