= 2120 South Michigan Avenue =

Instrumental by the Rolling Stones

from the EP Five By Five
- Released: 14 August 1964 (UK); 17 October 1964 (US 12 X 5 album)
- Recorded: 11 June 1964
- Studio: Chess, Chicago
- Genre: Instrumental rock; blues rock; R&B
- Length: 2:07
- Label: Decca (UK); London (US)
- Songwriter: Nanker Phelge
- Producer: Andrew Loog Oldham

"2120 South Michigan Avenue" is an original instrumental by the Rolling Stones, recorded for their second EP Five by Five. It was also released on their second US album 12 X 5 in 1964. Composer credit goes to Nanker Phelge, a title giving credit equally to all members of the band. In the book Rolling with the Stones, Bill Wyman recalls that the composition process started with him playing a bass riff and that the others followed on jamming.

The title refers to the address of the offices and recording studios of Chess Records and Checker Records in Chicago, where the five selections for the EP were recorded in June 1964.

AllMusic reviewer Richie Unterberger described the track as "a great groovin' original blues-rock jam". The tune was originally released at just over two minutes in length, fading early for lack of time available on a conventional EP in 1964. A full-length (3:38 minute) version appears on the 1964 West German Decca LP Around And Around, and the 2002 CD re-release of 12 X 5. There is also a rarer second take which has a rougher, more blues-based sound than the better known Five by Five rock-groove version. This version, with its short but distinctive tremolo guitar riff, was under consideration as the title track of an eventually unreleased 1964 blues album.

When the Stones appeared on The Ed Sullivan Show on May 2, 1965, the band played "2120 South Michigan Avenue" for 1 minute and 18 seconds during the closing credits. Mick Jagger played the harmonica solo, while Brian Jones, who played the harmonica on the original record, played rhythm guitar. An off-screen announcer read brief advertisements for Easy-Off Spray Starch and Pillsbury Flour during the performance.

In 2011, George Thorogood and the Destroyers released an album called 2120 South Michigan Ave., which includes a cover of the Stones' piece as well as covers of other Chess Records artists.

The song "Space Rock Pt. 2" which came out in 1967 by the Cleveland, Ohio band, The Baskerville Hounds, was based on this track, although composition is credited solely to D.J. Kohler.

== Personnel ==
- Bill Wyman – bass guitar
- Brian Jones – harmonica
- Charlie Watts – drums
- Keith Richards – guitar
- Ian Stewart – organ
- Mick Jagger – tambourine
