= The Hard Stuff (George Thorogood and the Destroyers album) =

Studio album by George Thorogood and the Destroyers
- Released: May 30, 2006
- Recorded: 2006
- Studio: Ardent Studios; Castle Oaks Studios; Glenwood Place Studios
- Genre: Blues rock; Boogie rock
- Length: 56:40
- Label: Eagle
- Producer: Jim Gaines; The Delaware Destroyers; Tom Hambridge

George Thorogood and the Destroyers chronology
| Ride 'Til I Die (2003) | The Hard Stuff (2006) | The Dirty Dozen (2009) |

The Hard Stuff is the thirteenth studio album by American blues rock band George Thorogood and the Destroyers. It was released in 2006 by the label Eagle Records. The album peaked at No. 2 on the Billboard Top Blues Album chart. It was their first album to feature Buddy Leach on saxophone following the departure of longtime saxophonist Hank "Hurricane" Carter.

== Release ==
Eagle Records released The Hard Stuff on May 30, 2006. The album peaked at No. 2 on the Billboard Top Blues Album chart.

== Critical reception ==
The Hard Stuff received generally positive reviews from critics.

Professional ratings
Review scores
| Source | Rating |
|---|---|
| AllMusic | 3.5/5 stars |
| Classic Rock | 7/10 stars |
| The Trades | A− |

AllMusic's Tim Sendra says "While the record doesn't exactly capture the loose, rock hard feel of albums he cut in his glory days, it is no patch on them and should remind people that Thorogood is a master of good time rockin' blues." A Billboard reviewer wrote "Thorogood shows not the slightest inclination to reinvent the wheel, happy to keep rolling down the hard -rocking road of which he is a master."

== Track listing ==
The Hard Stuff Track Listing
| No. | Title | Writer(s) | Length |
|---|---|---|---|
| 1. | "The Hard Stuff" | George Thorogood, Jim Suhler, Tom Hambridge | 3:51 |
| 2. | "Hello Josephine" | Dave Bartholomew, Antoine "Fats" Domino Jr. | 3:05 |
| 3. | "Moving" | Chester Arthur Burnett | 4:13 |
| 4. | "I Got My Eyes On You" | Mike Morgan | 3:32 |
| 5. | "I Didn't Know" | Thorogood, Hambridge | 2:56 |
| 6. | "Any Town U.S.A." | Thorogood, Suhler, Hambridge | 4:16 |
| 7. | "Little Rain" | Ewart Abner, Jimmy Reed | 4:09 |
| 8. | "Cool It!" | Suhler | 3:01 |
| 9. | "Love Doctor" | Richard Fleming, Hambridge | 3:39 |
| 10. | "Dynaflow Blues" | Johnny Shines | 3:45 |
| 11. | "Rock Party" | Holland K. Smith | 4:22 |
| 12. | "Drifter's Escape" | Bob Dylan | 3:15 |
| 13. | "Give Me Back My Wig" | Theodore Roosevelt "Hound Dog" Taylor | 4:25 |
| 14. | "Takin' Care Of Business" | Rudy Toombs | 4:12 |
| 15. | "Huckle Up Baby" | Bernard Besman, John Lee Hooker | 3:59 |
| Total length: | | | 56:40 |

== Personnel ==
=== Delaware Destroyers ===
- George Thorogood – guitar, vocals
- Jim Suhler – guitar
- Bill Blough – bass
- Jeff Simon – drums
- Buddy Leach – saxophone

=== Additional musicians ===
- Rick Steff – accordion, piano

=== Technical ===
- Delaware Destroyers – producer
- Jim Gaines – producer
- Tom Hambridge – producer
- Mike Donahue – executive producer
- Shawn Berman – engineer
- Leon Zervos – mastering
- Joshua Blanchard, Jason Gillespie, Jay Goin, Adam Hill – assistant engineers
- Henry Marquez – art direction
- Chris Cuffaro – photography
- Steve Morse – liner notes
