= Decisions (Jim Allchin album) =

Studio album by Jim Allchin
- Released: June 16, 2017
- Recorded: Blackbird Studios, Nashville, and Studio 3038, Seattle, Washington
- Genre: Blues rock
- Length: 50:36
- Label: Sandy Key Music LLC
- Producer: Tom Hambridge

Jim Allchin chronology
Q.E.D. (2013)	Decisions (2017)	Prime Blues (2018)

Decisions is the third widely available studio album by American blues rock musician and computer scientist Jim Allchin. It was released on June 16, 2017 by Sandy Key Music. The title of the album is a reference to the decisions we make in our life about identity, relationships, and how to live life authentically.

== Reception ==
Decisions received positive comments and ratings by reviewers.

== Track listing ==
No.	Title	Writer(s)	Length
1.	"Artificial Life"	Jim Allchin	3:42
2.	"The Mexican End"	Jim Allchin	3:16
3.	"Bad Decisions"	Jim Allchin, Tom Hambridge, Richard Fleming	3:04
4.	"Healing Ground, feat. Keb' Mo'"	Jim Allchin, Tom Hambridge, Richard Fleming	3:45
5.	"Blew Me Away"	Jim Allchin	3:14
6.	"She is It"	Jim Allchin, Tom Hambridge, Richard Fleming	2:59
7.	"Just Plain Sick"	Jim Allchin	2:42
8.	"Friends"	Jim Allchin	4:48
9.	"You Might Be Wrong"	Jim Allchin	3:00
10.	"After Hours"	Jim Allchin	4:04
11.	"Don't Care"	Jim Allchin	3:18
12.	"Stop Hurting Me"	Jim Allchin	5:14
13.	"My Father's Eyes"	Jim Allchin	4:10
14.	"Destiny"	Jim Allchin	2:46

== Personnel ==
Musicians

- Jim Allchin – guitar, vocals, arrangements
- Tom Hambridge – drums, percussion
- Michael Rhodes – bass
- Reese Wynans – keyboard
- Rob McNelley – guitar
- Steve Mackey – bass on "After Hours," "Destiny"
- Kenny Greenberg – guitar on "After Hours," "Destiny"
- James Wallace – keyboard on "After Hours," "Destiny"
- Pat Buchannan – guitar

Guest musicians

- Keb' Mo' – vocals on "Healing Ground"
- Mycle Wastman – background vocals on "She is It," "You Might Be Wrong," "Healing Ground"
- Wendy Moten – background vocals on "Healing Ground"
- The Heart Attack Horns – horns

Production

- Tom Hambridge – produced
- Ernesto Olvera-Lapier – tracking and mixing engineer engineering, mixing
- Sean Badum (Studio D) – assistant engineer
- Jason Mott (Studio E) – assistant engineer
- Tommy MacDonald – project assistant
- John Heithaus – project executive
- The Switchyard – mastering
