= Mike Morgan (musician) =

American blues musician

- Born: November 30, 1959 (age 65); Dallas, Texas, United States
- Genres: Texas blues, electric blues
- Occupations: Guitarist, harmonicist, singer, songwriter
- Instrument(s): Guitar, harmonica, vocals
- Years active: Late 1980s-present
- Labels: Various, including Rounder and Black Top
- Website: Official website

Michael Robert Morgan (born November 30, 1959, in Dallas, Texas) is an American Texas and electric blues musician. He has released 14 albums to date, on various record labels including Rounder, Black Top and Severn Records. The majority of his releases have featured his long-standing backing band, The Crawl. Morgan has played alongside Darrell Nulisch, Lee McBee, Gary Primich, and Randy McAllister.

== Biography ==
Morgan was born in Dallas, but grew up in Hillsboro, Texas. He received his first guitar at an early age, and initially concentrated on playing rock music. In 1985, he converted to blues and blues-rock, before relocating back to Dallas in 1986. There he met Darrell Nulisch, who was one of the founding members of The Crawl. The group was named for a Lonnie Brooks song.

Mike Morgan and the Crawl earned a reputation playing around Dallas and the Fort Worth area, before Nulisch left them in 1989, to be replaced by the singer and harmonica player, Lee McBee. Following a performance at the New Orleans Jazz & Heritage Festival, their debut 1990 album, Raw & Ready, saw them undertake national and international tours. Further albums including Full Moon Over Dallas, and Ain't Worried No More, ensued, before Morgan recorded without his backing group on Let The Dogs Run (1994) with Jim Suhler. In 1994, Mike Morgan and the Crawl appeared on the bill at the Notodden Blues Festival. Later group releases included their Black Top swansong, I Like the Way You Work It, but at the end of the 1990s, McBee left the band. Buoyed by the experience of playing behind Nulisch, Keith Dunn, and Chris Whynaught, 2000's Texas Man saw Morgan's vocalist debut. Live in Dallas (2004) followed before Morgan's latest effort, Stronger Every Day, released in March 2008, which included further accompaniment from McBee and Randy McAllister.

Recent activity has seen a reduction in touring, and Morgan is working as a sales manager in a Mesquite, Texas, motorcycle dealership.

== Discography ==
- Raw & Ready (1990) - Black Top Records
- Mighty Fine Dancin' (1991) - Black Top
- Full Moon Over Dallas (1992) - Black Top
- Ain't Worried No More (1994) - Black Top
- Let the Dogs Run (1994) - Black Top
- Looky Here! (1996) - Black Top
- Lowdown and Evil (1997) - Zensor [compilation of Black Top material]
- The Road (1998) - Black Top
- I Like the Way You Work It (1999) - Black Top
- Texas Man (2000) - Severn Records
- Live in Dallas (2004) - Severn
- Free Ourselves (2005) - Mike Morgan Productions
- Stronger Every Day (2008) - Severn
- The Lights Went Out in Dallas (2022) - M.C. Records

== See also ==
- List of Texas blues musicians
- List of electric blues musicians
