= If You Need Me =

Single by Solomon Burke

from the album If You Need Me
- B-side: "You Can Make It If You Try"
- Released: April 1963
- Recorded: March 15, 1963
- Genre: Soul
- Length: 2:35
- Label: Atlantic
- Songwriter(s): Robert Bateman, Wilson Pickett, Sonny Sanders
- Producer(s): Bert Berns

Solomon Burke singles chronology
"Words" (1963)	"If You Need Me" (1963)	"Can't Nobody Love You" (1963)

"If You Need Me" is a 1963 song co-written and originally recorded by Wilson Pickett. It was made into a bigger hit by Solomon Burke, who sent the song to #2 on the R&B charts that year.

== Overview ==
The song was written by Wilson Pickett with two former members of the Satintones, Robert Bateman (who had also co-written "Please Mr. Postman") and Sonny Sanders. It was recorded originally by Pickett on March 15, 1963, for Lloyd Price's Detroit-based Double L Records. It had been rejected by Jerry Wexler (Atlantic), who nevertheless had purchased the publishing rights. According to Burke, Pickett gave the song to him on a tour bus: "Wilson sang the song for me in a bus on a tour. I loved it so much that I got Wilson to do it. Atlantic refused to sign him at that time, so we got Wilson to release the song on the Lloyd-Logan label. We were the best of friends. As a matter of fact, I promoted his record and he promoted mine." However, Pickett claims Wexler lifted it from demo tapes he had sent Atlantic. Burke recalled in 2003: "I was furious when Wexler rejected Pickett", and when radio personality the Magnificent Montague started spinning Pickett's original version, Wexler rushed out Burke's, with both in Billboard 's "Singles Review" column on April 13 and both featured on Billboard's "Artists' Biographies" on May 4, 1963. Although Burke ultimately won the chart war, Burke broke rank and supported his rival: "I would go to the radio stations and say, ‘Hi, I'm Solomon Burke, and I'm here promoting the new record “If You Need Me”…by Wilson Pickett.’"

== Release and reaction ==
Despite his efforts, Burke's version jockeyed with Pickett's for position in the Hot 100, before "beating Pickett to the punch" because of "Solomon’s popularity and Atlantic’s distribution." Both versions had Cissy Houston singing backup vocals. Despite his anger, in 1964, Pickett signed with Atlantic because he needed the "bread." While Burke's version spent 5 weeks at #2 in the R&B charts in the American summer of 1963, kept from the number one position by Jackie Wilson's "Baby Workout" and Sam Cooke's "Another Saturday Night", Pickett's original stalled at #64 in the Pop charts and #30 on the R&B chart. "If You Need Me" was "the first of several great preaching scorchers": "Can’t Nobody Love You", "You’re Good For Me", and "Goodbye Baby, Baby Goodbye", which were all arranged by Gary Sherman, the man behind many Garnet Mimms hits.

=== Chart performance ===
==== Solomon Burke ====
Chart (1963)	Peak position
US Billboard Hot 100	37
US Billboard Hot R&B Singles	2

==== Wilson Pickett ====
Chart (1963)	Peak position
US Billboard Hot 100	64
US Billboard Hot R&B Singles	30

== Cover versions ==
- The song was covered by the Rolling Stones on their album 12 x 5 released in October 1964.
- It was covered by the Hep Stars in 1965 on the B-side of their third single and on their first live album Hep Stars on Stage.
- Tom Jones recorded the song as one of the tracks of his 1965 debut album Along Came Jones.
