= Sonny Sanders =

American soul singer-songwriter and record producer-arranger (1939–2016)

William Nelson "Sonny" Sanders (August 6, 1939 – October 12, 2016) was an American soul music singer, songwriter, arranger, and record producer.

Born in Chicago, Sanders made his first recording in 1955, on "Tears of Love" / "Roxanna" by Sax Kari and the Qualtones. He formed the Satintones in Detroit in 1957, with Robert Bateman, James Ellis and Sammy Mack. They became the first vocal group signed to Motown, and released their first record, "Going to the Hop" / "Motor City" in 1960. Sanders also worked as a backing singer at Motown, on such records as Marv Johnson's "You Got What It Takes" and Barrett Strong's "Money (That's What I Want)"; and as an arranger.

After the Satintones disbanded, Sanders left Motown in the early 1960s, but continued to work as an arranger on records including the Reflections "Just Like Romeo and Juliet". In 1965 he was recruited to work with record producer Carl Davis in Chicago, and arranged songs for Mary Wells, Edwin Starr's "Agent Double-O-Soul", and Jackie Wilson’s "Higher and Higher", and "I Get the Sweetest Feeling". Other artists with whom he worked, notably at Brunswick Records, included Gene Chandler, the Chi-Lites, and Tyrone Davis.

With Eugene Record of the Chi-Lites, he co-wrote Barbara Acklin's "Am I the Same Girl", the backing track of which later became "Soulful Strut" credited to Young-Holt Unlimited; and, with Wilson Pickett and former Satintones bandmate Robert Bateman, he co-wrote "If You Need Me", first recorded by Pickett and also a chart hit for Solomon Burke; it was later recorded by the Rolling Stones. Sanders also worked with Bateman's nephew, Jeffree (singer of the Steppers classic "Love's Gonna Last") on Jackie Wilson's Beautiful Day album. In the 1970s, he worked with Chubby and the Turnpikes, who later became Tavares; and the band Manchild, who included the musician Babyface. In 1998 Sanders and Carl Davis produced Eugene Record's last album, Let Him In. He also set up a gospel music publishing company, Joy Over One.

Sanders died in Detroit during the fall of 2016. He was 77.
