= Jim Allchin =

American computer scientist, philanthropist and guitarist

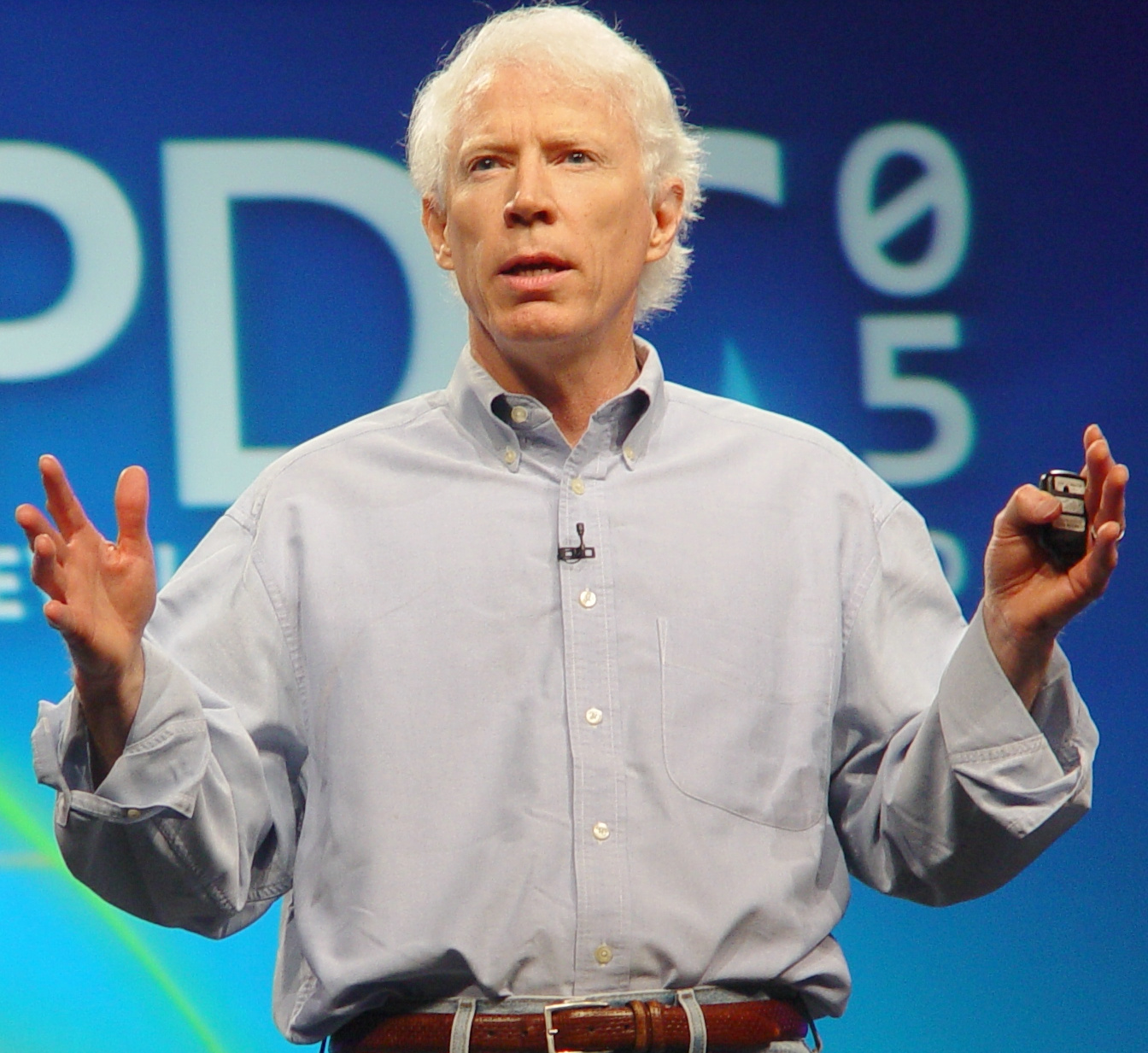
- Allchin in 2005

Background information
- Born: 1951 (age 74–75); Grand Rapids, Michigan, United States
- Genres: Blues rock; blues
- Occupations: Musician; Computer scientist
- Instruments: Guitar; vocals
- Website: jimallchin.com
- Education: University of Florida (BS); Stanford University (MS); Georgia Institute of Technology (PhD)
- Known for: His work at Microsoft; Guitar

James Edward Allchin (born 1951, Grand Rapids, Michigan, United States) is an American computer scientist, philanthropist and guitarist best known for being a former Microsoft executive.

He assisted Microsoft in creating many of the system platform components including Microsoft Windows, Windows Server, server products such as SQL Server, and developer technologies. He built Microsoft's server business and lead foundational releases of Windows 2000, Windows XP and Windows Vista. He is also known for his leading role in the architecture and development of the directory services technology Banyan VINES.

He has won numerous awards in his career such as the Technical Excellence Person of the Year in 2001. Jim Allchin led the Platforms division at Microsoft, overseeing the development of Windows client from Windows 98 to Windows Vista, Windows Server from NT Server 4.0 to Windows Server 2008, as well as several releases of Microsoft server products as well as Windows CE and Windows Embedded line of products. After serving sixteen years at Microsoft, Allchin retired in early 2007 when Microsoft officially released the Windows Vista operating system to consumers. He is now a professional musician.

== Biography ==
=== Early years ===
Allchin was born in Grand Rapids, Michigan, in 1951. His father originally worked as a warehouse worker. While he was still an infant, the Allchin family moved to Keysville, Florida, where his parents worked on a citrus farm. Allchin grew up in a tin-roof house built by his father. When he and his brother Keith were children, they earned by hoeing weeds on the farm's orange orchard. As a child, he spent some of his free time learning music. Allchin first began playing the trumpet but later switched to the guitar. He had an aptitude for science and engineering, and would repair go-karts and tractors around the farm. Neither of his parents attended college, but his father had a natural talent for math and would perform business calculations off the top of his head.

While in high school, he got a job as an intern at a payroll-processing company in Winter Haven, Florida. While there, he wrote his first computer program, which determined the day of the week based on the date input. He studied electrical engineering at the University of Florida, but dropped out to play in a number of bands, including Rain, Tudor Rose, and Red, White and Blue. They played various clubs and roadhouses in the South, before he decided that he did not enjoy life on the road. He later returned to the university and graduated with BS in Computer Science in 1973.

After receiving his degree, Allchin joined Texas Instruments, where he helped build a new operating system. Afterwards, he followed a former lecturer, Dick Kiger, to Wyoming, where he helped him to start a new company offering computer services nationwide, before moving on to start another company with Kiger in Dallas, Texas.

Allchin returned to his studies, earning the degree of MS in Computer Science from Stanford University in 1980. Allchin wrote a language-independent, portable file system while at Stanford. While pursuing his PhD in Computer Science at Georgia Institute of Technology in the early eighties, he was the primary architect of the Clouds distributed object-oriented operating system; his PhD thesis was entitled "An Architecture for Reliable Decentralized Systems".

In 1983, Allchin was recruited to Banyan by founder Dave Mahoney, eventually being Senior Vice President and Chief Technology Officer. During his seven years at Banyan, he created the VINES distributed operating system, which included the StreetTalk directory protocol as well as a series of network services based on the Xerox XNS stack.

Bill Gates tried to recruit a reluctant Allchin to join Microsoft for a year, yet successfully convinced him to join in 1990. Gates told him that whatever he created would have a wider customer base through Microsoft than anyone else.

Allchin is known as a prolific computer programmer/engineer. Allchin is also known for debugging systems remotely by having the person on the phone toggle in hexadecimal via front panel switches of early computers to correct problems.

=== Microsoft ===
Initially, Gates put Allchin in charge of revamping LAN Manager, using his networking expertise. However, Allchin scrapped the project, citing the need to start fresh.

Allchin's first high-profile project at Microsoft was the Cairo technology, which was intended to add on to Windows NT to create the next version of the operating system. At the NT Developer Conference in July 1992, Allchin gave a presentation about the future Microsoft operating system. One of the main goals for Cairo was the ability for users to locate files based on their content as opposed to their name. Users would also have access to files stored on other machines on a network as easily as they had access to files on their own hard drives. Cairo was scheduled to ship as a single package in 1994. After several delays, it was finally released in pieces; the technology was shipped in successive operating system releases. The Cairo and Windows NT groups were combined, and Allchin created a new client and server organization focused on business and IT users. Allchin replaced Dave Cutler as the lead developer on Windows NT version 3.5 onwards. This led to conflict with Vice President Brad Silverberg, who was in charge of the development of Windows 95, the operating system which was aimed at the personal computer market as opposed to Windows NT's business computer market. Allchin and Silverberg also came into conflict over whether Windows or Internet Explorer should be Microsoft's flagship product, and Allchin eventually won despite Silverberg's promotion of IE.

In 1999, Microsoft re-organized its corporate structure. The Consumer Division, which maintained versions of Windows for home users and the Business & Enterprise Division, which maintained Windows NT, were combined into a single operating system division: the Platform Group. Allchin became the vice president of the new combined group. This promotion put him in charge of the development of both the home and business versions of Windows. With the release of Windows XP in 2001, both business and client versions of the operating system utilized the same code base. The server business grew substantially during this period of time.

Allchin fostered an environment of transparency in the Windows division, with the company providing the public with regular updates on the development process.

Allchin was diagnosed with cancer in late 2002 and took a leave of absence for part of 2003. He recovered from the illness, which changed his perspective on life. He decided at that time to retire from Microsoft, although Gates suggested that Allchin stay with the company for a while longer.

On September 20, 2005, Microsoft announced that Allchin would become co-president of a new Platform Products and Services Group, which combined the old Platform Group, Server and Tools Group, and the MSN Group. Microsoft also announced that Allchin would retire after Windows Vista shipped, leaving Kevin Johnson as the president.

Allchin was a member of the Senior Leadership Team at Microsoft – a small group responsible for developing Microsoft's core direction along with Steve Ballmer and Bill Gates. He was claimed to be blunt, technical, and "straightforward." Bill Gates complimented him:

"He's a brilliant technologist, visionary, and a strong leader."

According to exhibits filed in 2006 by the plaintiff in the case of Comes v. Microsoft, Allchin wrote a memo to Bill Gates and Steve Ballmer in January 2004, one which was critical of Microsoft and Longhorn. The letter said that Gates and Ballmer had lost their way and compared them to Apple who he believed had not.

I am not sure how the company lost sight of what matters to our customers (both business and home) the most, but in my view we lost our way. I think our teams lost sight of what bug-free means, what resilience means, what full scenarios mean, what security means, what performance means, how important current applications are, and really understanding what the most important problems our customers face are. I see lots of random features and some great vision, but that doesn't translate into great products. I would buy a Mac today if I was not working at Microsoft.... Apple did not lose their way....

Allchin was also critical of Microsoft relaxing its requirements for computers to carry the 'Vista Capable' badge. The seal, designed to inform customers of a computer's ability to run the Windows Vista operating system, was not initially intended for computers running Intel's 915 chipset. This was overturned, however, after Intel voiced their dissatisfaction with the decision. In an email to Microsoft's Steve Ballmer, Allchin wrote:

I believe we are going to be misleading customers with the Capable program. OEMs will say a machine is Capable and customers will believe that it will run all the core Vista features. ...We must avoid confusion. It is wrong for customers.

=== Controversies ===
Running the most profitable product areas within Microsoft caused Allchin to be involved in many controversies and disputes along with his business and technical leadership responsibilities.

Brad Silverberg, the Microsoft executive who had been responsible for Windows 95, emailed several people in Microsoft September 27, 1991:

... after IBM announces support for DR-DOS at comdex, it's a small step for them to also announce they will be selling NetWare Lite, maybe sometime soon thereafter. but count on it. We don't know precisely what ibm is going to announce. my best hunch is that they will offer dr-dos as the preferred solution for 286, os 2 2.0 for 386. they will also probably continue to offer msdos at $165 (drdos for $99). drdos has problems running windows today, and I assume will have more problems in the future.

Jim Allchin replied:

You should make sure it has problems in the future. :-)

During the United States v. Microsoft antitrust trial, emails sent by Allchin to other Microsoft executives were considered as an evidence by the government lawyers to back up their claim that the integration of Internet Explorer and Windows had more to do with their competition with Netscape Communications Corporation than innovation.

During the Caldera v. Microsoft case, emails from Allchin to Bill Gates were introduced as an evidence. One email, from September 1991, included Allchin telling Gates that "We need to slaughter Novell before they get stronger."

In August 1998, Allchin asked an engineer named Vinod Valloppillil to analyse the open source movement and the Linux operating system. Valloppillil wrote two memos which were intended for Senior Vice-President Paul Maritz, who was the most senior executive at that time after Bill Gates and Steve Ballmer. Both memos were leaked and popularly known as the Halloween documents.

On September 29, 1998, Allchin was deposed to respond to the testimony of Professor Edward Felten. Later he testified in court from February 1 to 4, 1999. Some of his testimony centered on the possibilities of removing Internet Explorer as stated by Felten. While Allchin proved his written testimony was correct in court, a video-taped demonstration created by Microsoft attorneys, which supposedly illustrated Allchin's points, was shown to be misleading. David Boies believed it was an avoidable mistake made by the Microsoft attorneys.

In May 2002, Allchin testified before Judge Colleen Kollar-Kotelly during the settlement hearing between Microsoft and the nine states (as well as the District of Columbia) involved in the United States v. Microsoft antitrust trial. Allchin was called to testify on two issues, the first of which gained the most publicity. In relation to the issue of sharing technical API and protocol information used throughout Microsoft products, which the states were seeking, Allchin's testimony discussed how releasing certain information could increase the security risk to consumers.

It is no exaggeration to say that the national security is also implicated by the efforts of hackers to break into computing networks. Computers, including many running Windows operating systems, are used throughout the United States Department of Defense and by the armed forces of the United States in Afghanistan and elsewhere.

=== Post-Microsoft career ===
After leaving Microsoft, Allchin devotes his time to music, technology, and philanthropy. He released his first album, Enigma, in 2009 calling the album a beta test. Then in September 2011, Allchin released his first widely distributed blues-themed album: Overclocked. The album Q.E.D. was released in September 2013 and Decisions followed in June 2017. Prime Blues, his latest album, was released in September 2018. Overclocked, Q.E.D., and Decisions all received widespread acclaim especially for Allchin's guitar work. Overclocked, Q.E.D., and Decisions were featured on iTunes as New and Noteworthy and all reached in the top 10 on Internet Blues Radio. Decisions was the No. 1 Blues Album in Washington State for 18 weeks starting in June 2017. And Decisions was in the 10 top Blues Rock albums nationally for 14 weeks. Prime Blues remained in the top 10 Blues Albums on the national Roots Music charts for 18 straight weeks, staying in the number 1 position for 2 weeks. Prime Blues was the number 1 Contemporary Blues Album nationally for 11 weeks.

== Bibliography ==
- Allchin, James Edward (1982). A suite of algorithms for maintaining replicated data using weak correctness conditions. Georgia Institute of Technology. ISBN B0006YHLIY.
- Allchin, James Edward (1982). Object-based synchronization and recovery. Georgia Institute of Technology. ISBN B0006YLEL4.
- Allchin, James Edward (1983). Support for objects and actions in CLOUDS: Status Report. Georgia Institute of Technology. ISBN B0006YHLI4.
- Allchin, James Edward (1983). An architecture for reliable decentralized systems. Georgia Institute of Technology. ISBN B0006YIFDY.
- Allchin, James Edward (1983). Facilities for supporting atomicity in operating systems. Georgia Institute of Technology. ISBN B0006YHLQG.
- Allchin, James Edward (1983). How to shadow a shadow. Georgia Institute of Technology. ISBN B00071W5PA.

== Discography ==
- Enigma (2009)
- Overclocked (2011)
- QED (2013)
- Decisions (2017)
- Prime Blues (2018)
- Costa Azul (2022)
