= Tom Hambridge =

American drummer (born 1960)

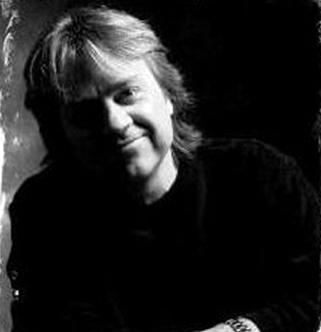

Background information
- Born: Thomas Jay Hambridge; December 20, 1960 (age 65); Buffalo, New York, United States
- Genres: Rock, country, blues
- Occupations: Record producer, musician, songwriter, drummer, singer
- Instruments: Drums, vocals
- Labels: Artemis Records, Superstar Records, EMI Music Publishing, Black Rose, Ocean Records, UTR Music Group
- Website: Official Website

Thomas Jay Hambridge (born December 20, 1960) is an American rock, country, and blues, producer, songwriter, musician drummer and vocalist. Hambridge has received two Grammy Awards, an ASCAP award, seven Grammy nominations, seven Boston Music Awards, and has been inducted into the Buffalo Hall of Fame. In December 2015, Hambridge was given the key to his hometown of Buffalo, New York with Mayor Byron Brown declaring December 28 "Tom Hambridge Day." Hambridge's songs have been recorded by several notable artists and have been featured in movie productions, commercials and television programs. He has been referred to as "The White Willie Dixon" by Rock and Roll Hall of Fame Inductee Buddy Guy and Susan Tedeschi's "Secret Weapon".

== Biography ==
Born and raised in Buffalo, New York, Hambridge began learning the drums at the age of 5. He played his first paying gig, a bar mitzvah, in third grade. Throughout his school years, Hambridge played in garage bands, his high school orchestra and jazz band. After graduating from high school in 1979, he received a scholarship at Boston's Berklee College of Music.

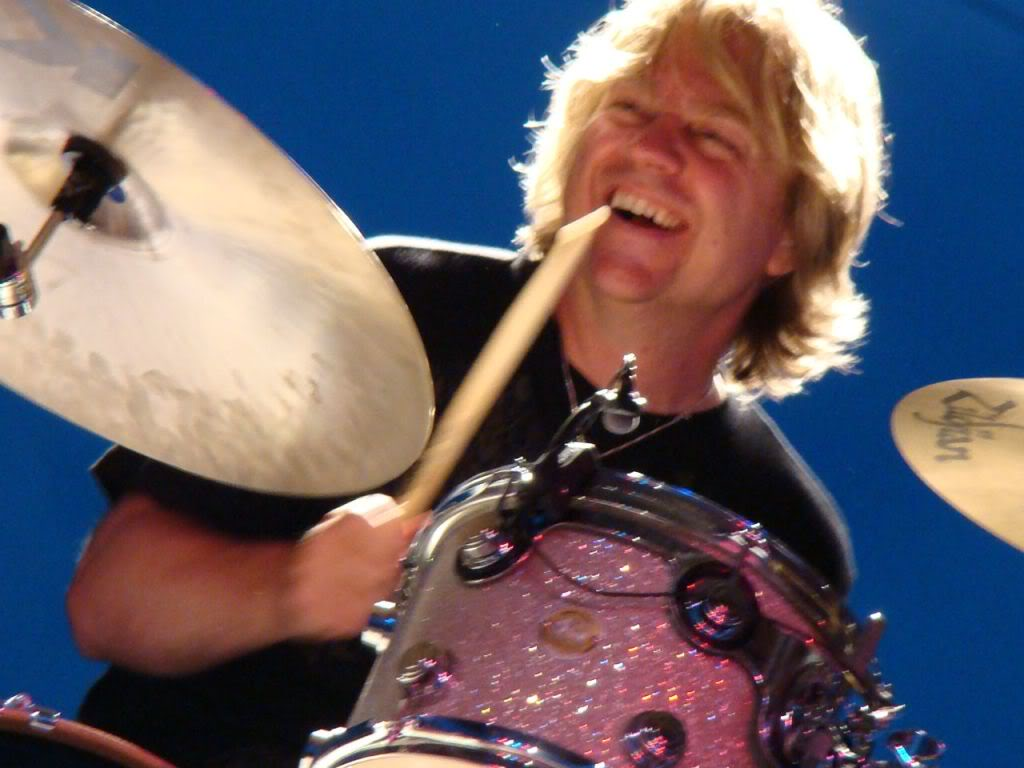
Tom Hambridge

He received his degree in Professional Music in 1983. After graduation, he worked for three years as drummer and lead singer for the blues guitarist Roy Buchanan. While working with Buchanan, Hambridge contributed as a musician on Buchanan's release, Live: Amazing Grace. In the meantime, he formed the band "T.H. and the Wreckage". In 1988, the band released Born to Rock, one of several independent, self-produced albums Hambridge has completed. Born To Rock was the first of the many Boston Music Awards he has received. In the meantime, he assisted promoters assemble backup bands for artists such as Bo Diddley, Percy Sledge, Chuck Berry, Gary Puckett, and Sha Na Na.

Hambridge released his own album Still Running in 1996.

In 1997, he produced Susan Tedeschi's Just Won't Burn. Hambridge wrote Tedeschi's Top 10 hits "Rock Me Right" and "It Hurt So Bad". In the meantime, he also released his own album Balderdash in 2000. Hambridge received a subsequent 2004 Grammy nomination (Grammy Award for Best Contemporary Blues Album) for his contributions on Johnny Winter's release I'm A Bluesman ("Cheatin' Blues" and "Lone Wolf"). Shortly thereafter, Hambridge released his album Bang N' Roll (2004) and the album Live (2007).

In 2008, he received Grammy nominations (Grammy Award for Best Traditional Blues Album) for his work on Buddy Guy's Skin Deep. Skin Deep debuted at number 68 on the Billboard 200 which was the highest position of any of Guy's previous albums, and was number 1 on the Billboard Blues Album Chart. Hambridge released his own album Boogieman (2009). In 2011, he won the Grammy Award for Best Contemporary Blues Album for co-writing and producing Buddy Guy's album Living Proof.

He was credited as the producer, songwriter and percussionist for George Thorogood and the Destroyers 2011 release 2120 South Michigan Ave., which included the song "Going Back" that reached number 1 on Classic Rock Radio. Also in 2011, he wrote and produced B. B. King and Buddy Guy's duet "Stay Around A Little Longer."

Other recognized 2011 successes include writing/co-writing all songs on Quinn Sullivan's release Cyclone (2011, number 7 on the Billboard Blues chart, July 30, 2011). Later in 2013, Hambridge would do the same on Quinn Sullivan's release Getting There, which charted at 38 on the Billboard Blues Chart.

In 2015, Hambridge earned his second Grammy Award for Best Blues Album for his contributions as a musician, producer, composer and mixer on Buddy Guy's Born to Play Guitar.

In 2016, Hambridge produced Mike Zito's album, Make Blues Not War, which debuted at number 1 on the Billboard Chart on December 10, 2016 and earned his seventh Grammy Award Nomination for his production work on Bloodline.

Hambridge's songs and productions have appeared on a variety of television shows, movies and commercials. These include "It Hurt's So Bad" (Susan Tedeschi) on PBS's Austin City Limits, Autumn Hearts, VH1's Born To Diva, NBC's Conan O'Brien, and The Late Late Show with Craig Kilborn. In addition, "Rock Me Right" (Susan Tedeschi) appeared in Autumn Hearts, David Letterman Show, NASCAR Rocks II (1999), and Flintstones in Viva Rock Vegas. "I Fell in Love" (Susan Tedeschi) appeared on the Bug soundtrack. Plus, "Road Trip" and "I Got A New Car" (Tom Hambridge) appeared in the movie Cars. "Flying By" (Billy Ray Cyrus) appeared in the film, Flying By.

Hambridge has performed multiple times at the White House. On February 21, 2012, he joined Buddy Guy, Keb Mo, Susan Tedeschi, Derek Trucks, Mick Jagger, B. B. King and others in a performance for the White House's "Red, White and Blues" Black History Month celebration concert. During the performance, President Barack Obama provided a brief history of the Blues and accompanied the group during the song "Sweet Home Chicago". On October 14, 2015, Hambridge returned to the White House with Buddy Guy, Marty Sammon, Trombone Shorty, Carol Burnett, Queen Latifah, MC Lyte, Keb Mo, Smokey Robinson and others for "A Celebration of American Creativity: In Performance at the White House", commemorating the 50th anniversary of the National Endowment for the Humanities.

== Credits as leader ==
Year	Album	Label
1995	Still Running	Bad Mood Records
1998	Balderdash	Artemis Records
2004	Bang N' Roll	UTR Music Group
2007	Tom Hambridge & the Rattlesnakes Live	Black Rose Records
2009	Boogieman	Black Rose Records
2011	Boom!	Superstar Factory
2018	The NOLA Sessions	Superstar Factory
2023	Blu Ja Vu	Quarto Valley Records
2025	Down The Hatch	Quarto Valley Records

== Credits as contributing artist ==
Year	Recording Artist	Album	Songs	Contribution	Award
1998	Susan Tedeschi	Just Won't Burn	Friars Point, It Hurt So Bad, Rock Me Right	Guest Artist, producer, Drums, Tambourine, Timbales, Percussion, Vocals (Background), composer	Grammy nominated Best Contemporary Blues Album
2000	Bernard Allison	Across The Water	I Want To Get You Back	Composer	
2000	Farm Aid	Farm Aid: Keep America Growing, Vol. 1		Composer	
2000	Flintstones in Viva Rock Vegas			Producer/Composer	
2002	Susan Tedeschi	Wait For Me	Til I Found You, I Fell in Love	Composer	
2002	NRBQ	Atsa My Band	You Were The One	Composer	
2002	Tim Krekel	Happy Town	Best Thing I Never Had	Vocals (Background), composer	
2003	Ana Popović	Comfort to the Soul	Fool Proof	Composer	
2003	George Thorogood & The Destroyers	Ride 'Til I Die	The Fixer	Guest Artist, producer, Vocals, composer	
2003	Lynyrd Skynyrd	Vicious Cycle	Jake, Mad Hatter, Pick'Em Up, Rockin' Little Town, Sweet Mama	Vocal Harmony, composer	
2003	Martin Scorsese: Best of the Blues	Best of The Blues	Best of the Blues	Performer (drums)	
2003	Peter Malick Group Featuring Norah Jones	New York City	New York City	Composer/Performer	
2004	Montgomery Gentry	You Do Your Thing		Additional Personnel, Vocals (Background), musician	
2004	Jeffrey Steele	Outlaw	Drive, Shot Glass	Percussion, Vocals (Background), musician, composer	
2004	Scott Holt	Chipped Front Tooth		Composer	
2004	Johnny Winter	I'm A Bluesman	Cheatin' Blues, Lone Wolf	Mixing, Audio Production, Drums, Percussion, Vocals (Background), composer	Grammy nominated; Best Contemporary Blues Album
2005	Delbert McClinton	Cost of Living	I Had A Real Good Time, Kiss Her Once For Me, One of the Fortunate Few, Right To Be Wrong	Vocals, Percussion, composer	
2005	Colin Linden	Southern Jumbo	I Give Up	Composer	
2005	Jimmy Thackery	Healin Ground	Get Up, Had Enough, Upside of Lonely	Main Personnel, Drums, composer	
2005	Keith Anderson	Three Chord Country and American Rock & Roll	Every Time I Hear Your Name, Podunk "Every Time I Hear Your Name" debuted at number 49 on the U.S. Billboard Hot Country Songs for the week of January 7, 2006.	Vocals, Vocals (Background), composer	2007 ASCAP Song of the Year. "Every Time I Hear Your Name" debuted at number 49 on the US Billboard Hot Country Songs for the week of January 7, 2006
2005	Shemekia Copeland	Soul Truth	You Can't Have That	Vocals (Background), composer	
2005	Van Zant	Get Right with the Man	I Know My History, Sweet Mama, Things I Miss The Most	Composer	
2006	Beccy Cole	Feel This Free	You Can't Have That	Composer	
2006	Cody McCarver	Peace, Love and Coondawgs	Country Badass	Composer	
2006	George Thorogood	The Hard Stuff	Any Town USA, The Hard Stuff	Percussion, Vocals (Background), Associate Producer, composer	
2006	John Brannen	Twilight Tattoo-Advance	Heartbreak Ridge	Drums, Percussion, composer	
2006	Lee Roy Parnell	Back to the Well	You Can't Lose 'Em All	Drums (Snare), composer	
2006	Montgomery Gentry	Some People Change	Your Tears Are Comin	Composer	
2006	Rodney Atkins	If You're Going Through Hell	About The South	Composer	
2006	Pat Green	Cannonball	I'm Tryin' To Find It	Composer	
2006	T. Graham Brown	Present	The Present	Composer	
2006	Tom Hambridge / Disney	Cars Lightning McQueen's Fast Tracks	Road Trip, I Got A New Car	Primary Artist	
2007	Billy Ray Cyrus	Home at Last	Flying By	Vocals (Background), composer	Flying By is a 2009 drama film directed by Jim Amatulli and starring Billy Ray Cyrus, Heather Locklear, Olesya Rulin and Patricia Neal. It was the final film for Neal.
2007	Joe Nichols	Real Things	My Whiskey Years	Composer	
2007	Van Zant	My Kind of Country	Friend, Goes Down Easy, My Kind of Country	Composer	
2007	Barbara Blue Blues Band	By Popular Demand		Composer	
2007	Disney	Pixar Buddy Songs / Ratatouille: What's Cooking?		Primary Artist	
2008	Andre Williams	Rhythm and Blues	She Don't Eat Meat	Producer, Liner Notes, Drums, Percussion	
2008	Felix Cavaliere	Nudge It Up A Notch	Impossible, Without You	Composer	
2008	Jeffrey Steele	Gold, Platinum, No Chrome, More Steele: Greatest Hits, Vol 2.	Everytime I Hear Your Name	Member of Attributed Artist, Drums, Percussion, composer	
2008	Jeffrey Steele	Countrypolitan	My Whiskey Years	Member of Attributed Artist, Drums, composer	
2008	Jeffrey Steele	Hell on Wheels	Helldorado, Sweet Salvation of Southern Rock and Roll, Tryin to Find It, Your	Composer	
2008	Steve Cropper	Nudge It Up A Notch	Impossible, Without You	Composer	
2008	Gary Nicholson (singer)	Whitey Johnson		Drums	
2008	Montgomery Gentry	My Town/You Do Your Thing		Vocals (Background), musician	
2008	Buddy Guy	Skin Deep	Best Damn Fool, Too Many Tears, Lyin' Like A Dog, Show Me The Money, Every Time I Sing The Blues, Out of The Woods, That's My Home, Skin Deep, Who's Gonna Fill Those Shoes	Producer, Mixing, Main Personnel, Vocals, Drums, Tambourine, Handclapping, Percussion, Vocals (Background)	Grammy nominated: Best Traditional Blues Album
2008	George Thorogood and The Destroyers	The Hard Stuff	Love Doctor, I Didn't Know	Composer	
2009	Billy Ray Cyrus	Back To Tennessee	Give It To Somebody	Composer	
2009	Chris Young	Man I Want To Be	The Shoebox	Composer	
2009	Andy Pratt	Live at the Village Underground 2003		Drums	
2009	Roy Buchanan	Live Amazing Grace		Drums	
2009	Jennie Devoe	Strange Sunshine		Composer	
2009	Delbert McClinton	Acquired Taste	She's Not There Anymore, Until Then	Drums, composer	
2009	Delbert McClinton	Boogieman	You're My Kind of Trouble	Composer	
2009	Don Rich	You're Mistaken	It Hurt So Bad	Composer	
2009	Jack Ingram	Big Dreams & High Hopes	Not Giving Up On Me	Composer	
2009	Mark Lowry	Life Gets Loud	Take It Up With Jesus	Composer	
2009	Murali Coryell	Sugar Lips	Blame It On Me, Closer To You Baby, I Could've Had You, I Still Do, Minor Funk, Still Rockin, Sugar Lips, What Works On You, What You Gonna Do About Me, Where is the Spirit	Producer, Drums, Percussion, Vocals (Background), composer	
2009	Taylor Hicks	Distance	Nineteen	Composer	
2010	Buddy Guy	Living Proof	All Tracks	Producer, Mixing, composer, Drums, Percussion, Tambourine, Vocals (Background)	Grammy Award winner, Best Contemporary Blues Album
2010	Danny Gokey	My Best Days	Life on Ya	Composer	
2010	Eden Brent	Ain't Got No Troubles	Right To Be Wrong	Composer	
2010	Steve Cropper & Felix Cavaliere	Midnight Flyer	All Nigh Long, Chance WIth Me, Early Morning, Midnight Flyer, Move The House, Now, Sexy Lady, When You're With Me, you Give Me All I Need	Producer, Drums, Percussion, Vocals (Background), composer	
2010	Gretchen Wilson	I Got Your Country Right Here	I Got Your Country Right Here, Walk on Water	Composer	
2010	Guitar Shorty	Bare Knuckle	Get Off	Composer	
2010	Meat Loaf	Hang Cool Teddy Bear	Boneyard	Composer	
2010	Joanna Smith	Getting Married	Gettin' Married	Composer	
2011	Billy Ray Cyrus	I'm American	Nineteen	Composer	
2011	George Thorogood	2120 South Michigan Ave.	Going Back, Willie Dixon's Gone	Producer, Mixing, Drums, Percussion, Vocals (Background), composer	
2011	Bob Bogdal/McKnight & Bogdal/Elam McKnight	Zombie Nation		Drums	
2011	Marcia Ball	Roadside Attractions	Their Party's Still Going On	Composer	
2011	Quinn Sullivan	Cyclone	All tracks	Composer/Performer/Producer	Album reached number 7 on the Billboard Blues Chart, July 30, 2011
2012	Joe Louis Walker	Hellfire	Hellfire, Ride All Night, I Won't Do That, I'm on To You, What's It Worth	Producer, Mixing, Drums, Percussion	
2012	Rascal Flatts	Changed	She's Leaving	Composer	
2012	Buddy Guy	Live at Legends	Best Damn Fool, Skin Deep Polka Dot Love, Coming For You	Producer, Mixing, Vocals (Background), Mastering, composer, Drums, Percussion, Tambourine	
2012	The Outlaws	It's About Pride	Nothin' Main About Main Street	Composer	
2012	ZZ Top	La Futura	Over you, I Don't Wanna Lose You, Threshold of A Break down	Composer	
2012	Lynyrd Skynyrd	Last of a Dyin Breed	Good Teacher, Nothing Comes Easy, Honey Hole, Do It Up Right	Composer	
2012	Colin Linden	Still Live	I Give Up	Composer	
2012	Beverly Rohlehr	Christmas Gumbo	Santa's Hideway	Composer	
2012	Michael Burks	Show of Strength	I Want To Get You Back	Composer	
2012	Jim Quick	Down South	It's Always Something	Composer	
2012	The Crawdiddies	Soul of A Man	'Til I Found You	Composer	
2012	Tre Michaels	Shotglass		Composer	
2012	Wayne Baker Brooks	Tricks Up My Sleeves EP		Composer, Drums, producer	
2012	Ernie and the Automatics	Good As Gone	Good Thing	Composer	
2013	Buddy Guy	Rhythm & Blues	Best in Town, Justifyin', I Go By Feel, What's Up With That Woman, One Day Away, What You Gonna Do About Me, The Devil's Daughter, Whiskey Ghost, Rhythm Inner Groove, Meet Me in Chicago, Too Damn Bad, Evil Twin, I Could Die Happy, Never Gonna Change, All That Makes Me Happy Is The Blues, My Mama Loved Me, Blues Don't Care, I Came Up Hard	Producer, Mixing, Mastering, composer, Drums, Tambourine, Vocals (Background)	Debuted at No. 1 on Billboard Magazine's Blues chart, Debuted at No. 27 on Billboard's Top 200 Albums
2013	Quinn Sullivan	Getting There	Checkin' Out, Catch A Groove, Getting There, World in Change, Mr. Gloom, I Know I Know, Rock Hard, She Gets Me, Cyclone, Like Your Love, Things I Won't Forget, End of the Day	Composer	Number 38 on the Billboard Blues Chart, August 24, 2013
2013	Delbert & Glen	Blind Crippled & Crazy	Peace in the Valley	Composer, Drums	
2013	George Thorogood/George Thorogood & The Destroyers	Icon		Producer	
2013	George Thorogood/George Thorogood & The Destroyers	Ride 'Til I Die/The Hard Stuff		Additional Production, Associate Producer, composer, Percussion, Vocals, Vocals (Background)	
2013	James Cotton	Cotton Mouth Man	Cotton Mouth Man, Midnight Train, Mississippi Mud, Something For Me, Blues Is Good For You, Hard Sometimes, He Was There, Saint on Sunday, Wrapped Around My Heart, Young Bold Women, Wasn't My Time To Go, Bonnie Blue	Producer, Mixing, Mastering, Drums, Percussion, Vocals (Background)	2014 Grammy nominee for Best Blues Album
2013	Eric Burdon	'Til Your River Runs Dry	Old Habits Die Hard	Composer	
2013	Jack Mack & The Heart Attack Horns	Look' Up!	Lonely No More, Lookin' Up, Good Man Gone	Composer	
2013	The McCrary Sisters	All The Way	Skin Deep	Composer	
2013	Sean Chambers	The Rock House Sessions	Just For the Thrill, Money in a Minute	Composer	
2013	Sena Ehrhardt	All In	I Want To Get You Back	Composer	
2013	Clay McClinton	Bitin' At The Bit	Sound of a Small Town	Composer	
2013	Andy T/Nick Nixon Band	Drink Drank Drunk	Drink Drank Drunk	Composer	
2013	RB Stone	Loosen Up	High Horse, Loosen Up, God Heals You When You Cry, She's Too Hot To Handle	Composer	
2013	Kree Harrison	American Idol Top 4 Season 12/19 Recordings	It Hurt So Bad	Composer	American Idol (season 12) Performance
2014	Devon Allman	Ragged & Dirty	Half Truth, Can't Lose 'Em All, Leavin, Times Have Changed	Producer, Mixing, Mastering, composer, Drums, Percussion, Tambourine, Vocals (Background), Xylophone	
2014	Brad Hatfield	For A Change	That's My Home, Back Door Scratchin', Behave Yourself, Smarter Than I Was, Devil on Both Shoulders, So Much So Little, Good Love After Bad, Drink Drank Drunk, For A Change, Swamp Poker	Composer	
2014	Keb' Mo'	BLUES Americana	Move	Composer, Drums	
2014	Lee Ann Womack	The Way I'm Livin		Drums (Bass)	
2014	Jeremiah Johnson	Grind		Mastering	
2014	Too Slim and the Taildraggers	Anthology	Wishing Well, Big Ol' House	Producer, Mixing, Drums, Percussion, Vocals (Background), Mastering	
2014	JW-Jones	Belmont Boulevard	Love Times Ten, Blue Jean Jacket, Coming After Me, Don't Be Ashamed, What Would Jimmie Do?, If It Feels Good Tomorrow, Cocaine Boy	Producer, Composer, Drums, Vocals (Background)	JUNO Award Nominee (Canada)
2014	Clay McClinton	Bitin' At The Bit	Sound of a Small Town	Composer	
2014	Joe Louis Walker	Hornet's Nest	Hornet's Nest, All I Wanted To Do, As The Sun Goes Down, Stick a Fork in Me, Love Enough, Ramblin' Soul, I'm Gonna Walk Outside, Not in Kansas Anymore, Keep the Faith	Producer, Mixing, Drums, Tambourine, Percussion, Vocals (Background), Mastering, composer	
2014	Dana Robbins	Danna Robbins	Hardest Part, Bless Your Heart	Producer, Mixing, Mastering, composer, Drums, Finger Snaps, Tambourine	
2015	Buddy Guy	Born To Play Guitar	Born To Play Guitar, Wear You Out (featuring Billy Gibbons), Back Up Mama, Whiskey Beer & Wine, Kiss Me Quick, Crying Out of One Eye, Turn Me Wild, Crazy World, Smarter Than I Was, Thick Like Mississippi Mud, Flesh And Bone (featuring Van Morrison), Come Back Muddy	Producer, Mixing, composer, Drums, Percussion, Tambourine, Triangle, Vocals (Background), Wind Chimes	Grammy for Best Blues Album
2015	Royal Southern Brotherhood	Don't Look Back	Hard Blues	Producer, Mixing, Mastering, composer	
2015	Rodney Atkins	Greatest Hits	About The South	Composer	
2016	Mike Zito	Make Blues Not War	Highway Mama, Wasted Time, Red Bird, Crazy Legs, Make Blues Not War, On The Road, One More Train To Ride, Girl Back Home, Chip Off The Old Block, Road Dog	Producer, Mixing, Drums, Mastering, composer, Vocal Harmony	Debuted at number 1 on the Billboard Music Chart on December 10, 2016
2016	Ana Popović	Trilogy		Mastering, Mixing, producer	
2016	Devon Allman	Ride Or Die	Shattered Times	Producer, Mixing, Drums, Percussion, Mastering, composer	
2016	Ronnie Dunn	Tattooed Heart	That's Why They Make Jack Daniels	Composer	
2016	Kenny Neal	Bloodline	Real Friend, I Can't Wait, I'm So Happy, I Go By Feel, Bloodline	Producer, Drums, Percussion, Vocals (Background), composer, engineer, Mastering, Mixing	Grammy nomination
2016	Joe Bonamassa	Blues of Desperation	Mountain Climbing, Distant Lonesome Train	Composer	
2016	Rossington	Take It on Faith	I Should’ve Known, Shame On Me, Something Fishy	Composer	
2016	Foghat	Under The Influence	Under The Influence, Knock It Off, Upside of Lonely, Heart's Gone Cold, Hot Mama, Ghost	Producer, Mixing, Percussion, composer	
2016	Tasha Taylor	Honey for the Biscuit	Weatherman, How Long, Leave That Dog Alone	Composer	
2017	Quinn Sullivan	Midnight Highway	Something For Me, Tell Me I'm Not Dreaming, Midnight Highway, Crazy into You, Eyes For You, Lifting Off, She Gets Me, Rocks, Going, Graveyard Stone, Big Sky, Buffalo Nickel	Composer/Producer/Performer	
2017	Jim Allchin	Decisions	All tracks	Producer, Drums, Percussion, composer	
2018	Joe Bonamassa	Redemption	Evil Mama	Composer	
2019	Christone "Kingfish" Ingram	Kingfish	Outside of this Town, Fresh Out, It Ain't Right, Been Here Before, If You Love Me, Love Ain't My Favorite Word, Listen, Before I'm Old, Believe These Blues, Trouble, Hard Times, That's Fine By Me	Producer, composer, Drums, Percussion, Background Vocals	2020 Grammy nominee for Best Traditional Blues Album
