= 2120 South Michigan Ave. =

Studio album by George Thorogood and the Destroyers
- Released: June 12, 2011
- Recorded: 2011
- Studio: House of Blues Studio, Encino, CA; Route 44 Studio, Sebastopol, CA; Rax Trax Studios, Chicago, IL
- Genre: Blues rock; Boogie rock
- Length: 46:05
- Label: Capitol
- Producer: Tom Hambridge

George Thorogood and the Destroyers chronology
The Dirty Dozen (2009)	2120 South Michigan Ave. (2011)

Singles from 2120 South Michigan Ave.
- 1. "Going Back" Released: June 2011

2120 South Michigan Ave. is the fifteenth studio album by George Thorogood and the Destroyers. It was released on June 12, 2011 by the label Capitol Records. The album peaked at No. 2 on the Billboard Top Blues Albums chart.

The title refers to the address of the offices and recording studios of Chess Records in Chicago. The album itself is a tribute to Chess Records.

== Background ==
Recording of this album started sometime in 2011, Capitol Records approached Thorogood with the idea for the album and selected most of the songs. Buddy Guy and Charlie Musselwhite perform on the album, although their work was added after primary recording was complete. The album was produced by Tom Hambridge.

== Release and content ==
Capitol Records released 2120 South Michigan Ave. on June 12, 2011. The album peaked at No. 2 on the Billboard Top Blues Album chart. "Going Back" was the lead single from the album.

The album contains ten covers of songs recorded on Chess Records by artists such as Chuck Berry, Bo Diddley, Willie Dixon, and Muddy Waters; plus a cover of The Rolling Stones' instrumental "2120 South Michigan Avenue" and two original songs about Chess Records artists.

== Critical reception ==
2120 South Michigan Ave. received positive reviews from critics.

Professional ratings
Review scores
Source	Rating
AllMusic	3.5/5 stars
Daily Vault	B
PopMatters	8/10
Record Collector	3/4 stars
The Republican	2.5/4 stars

AllMusic's Stephen Thomas Erlewine wrote "George Thorogood & the Destroyers have never made their debt to Chess Records a secret, so an album-length tribute to the home of Muddy Waters, Howlin’ Wolf, Willie Dixon, Chuck Berry, and Bo Diddley is a logical move for the rough and tumble blues-rockers." Daily Vault's Christopher Thelen says "2120 South Michigan Avenue will be a treat to not only that fanbase, but to students of classic blues music – and, if the listener learns something while enjoying this disc, all the better." William Pinfold of Record Collector wrote "That said, from the slightly cheesy influence-referencing Going Back to the final Stones cover, it’s a wholly enjoyable album with heart and soul to spare. Blues artists have usually gotten better with age and it seems that George Thorogood is following that tradition."

== Track listing ==
No.	Title	Writer(s)	Length
1.	"Going Back"	Tom Hambridge, George Thorogood	3:24
2.	"Hi-Heel Sneakers" (featuring Buddy Guy)	Robert Higginbotham	3:29
3.	"Seventh Son"	Willie Dixon	3:07
4.	"Spoonful"	Dixon	4:13
5.	"Let It Rock"	Chuck Berry	2:55
6.	"Two Trains Running (Still a Fool)"	McKinley Morganfield	5:13
7.	"Bo Diddley"	Ellas McDaniel	3:08
8.	"Mama Talk to Your Daughter"	J. B. Lenoir, Alex Atkins	2:30
9.	"Help Me"	Dixon, Aleck "Rice" Miller, Ralph Bass	4:02
10.	"My Babe" (featuring Charlie Musselwhite)	Dixon	3:20
11.	"Willie Dixon's Gone"	Hambridge, Thorogood	3:12
12.	"Chicago Bound"	James A. Lane	2:59
13.	"2120 South Michigan Ave." (featuring Charlie Musselwhite)	Nanker Phelge	4:38

== Personnel ==
The following personnel are credited on the album:

=== Delaware Destroyers ===
- George Thorogood – lead guitar, rhythm guitar and slide guitar, vocals
- Bill Blough – bass
- Buddy Leach – saxophones
- Jeff Simon – drums
- Jim Suhler – rhythm and lead guitar

=== Additional musicians ===
- Buddy Guy – lead guitar (track 2)
- Tom Hambridge – drums, percussion, background vocals
- Tommy MacDonald – bass
- Kevin McKendree – piano, Hammond B3 organ
- Charlie Musselwhite – harmonica (tracks 10, 13)
- Marla Thorogood – background vocals
- Rio Thorogood – background vocals

=== Technical ===
- Tom Hambridge – producer
- Mike Donahue – executive producer
- Harry Gale – engineer
- Mike Tholen – engineer
- Shawn Berman – engineer
- Susan Lavoie – art direction
- Mark Holley – design
- Brian To – photography
