= The Satintones =

American musical group

The Satintones were an American R&B group who recorded together in the late 1950s and early 1960s. They are notable as the first group ever to record for the Motown label.

The original members were Charles "Chico" Leverett, Sonny Sanders, James Ellis, and Robert Bateman. The group went through a line-up change in 1961, Leverett leaving the group and being replaced by two new members, Vernon Williams and Sammy Mack. They recorded six singles for the Motown label between 1959 and 1961, though they never scored a hit record. The group disbanded at the end of 1961.

== Career ==
When Tamla Records (the precursor of what is now known as "Motown") was founded in January 1959, Sanders and Bateman were working for the label's owner Berry Gordy as backing singers. They tried to form a new vocal group of their own with Brian Holland (later to find fame as part of the Holland-Dozier-Holland songwriting trio) and Sanders' neighbour James Ellis. When Holland was unable to attend rehearsals because of his commitments to the fledgling Motown label, the group instead recruited songwriter Chico Leverett (who recorded a solo single for Motown entitled "Solid Sender" in early 1959) and signed to Motown under the name "the Satintones".

The Satintones were the first group to record a single for Motown, beating out Smokey Robinson's group the Miracles by three months. Their first record, "Going To The Hop" b/w "Motor City", was not a success, although group members later claimed the title of the B-side led to Gordy adopting the name "Motown" a few months later.

The group recorded several more singles for Motown, the most notorious of which, a song entitled "Tomorrow and Always", was withdrawn for legal reasons, owing to a copyright infringement suit which alleged the song was too similar to the Shirelles' "Will You Love Me Tomorrow".

Leverett left the Satintones in 1961, and the group never found a replacement songwriter. They recorded two more singles for Motown before disbanding at the end of 1961. The group recorded a large amount of unreleased material in preparation for a proposed LP which never materialised; these recordings were finally released on CD in 2009 as part of The Satintones Sing, an anthology dedicated to the group's work.

Robert Bateman went on to form a songwriting and production partnership with Brian Holland (under the name "Brianbert"). Sanders became a prominent arranger and producer in Chicago The group briefly reunited for Ian Levine's Motorcity Records project in the late 1980s.

Chico Leverett died on December 5, 2013, aged 79. Bateman died on October 12, 2016, at the age of 80, from a heart attack. Sonny Sanders also died on the same day.

== Discography ==
=== Singles ===
- "Going to the Hop" b/w "Motor City" (Tamla T 54026, July 1959)
- "My Beloved" b/w "Sugar Daddy" (Motown M 1000, October 1959)
- "Tomorrow and Always" b/w "A Love That Can Never Be" (Motown M 1006, April 1961) (withdrawn)
- "Angel" b/w "A Love That Can Never Be" (Motown M 1006, May 1961) (replacement release)
- "I Know How It Feels" b/w "My Kind of Love" (Motown M 1010, June 1961)
- "Zing! Went the Strings of My Heart" b/w "Faded Letter" (Motown M 1020, October 1961)

=== Albums ===
- The Satintones Sing! The Complete Tamla and Motown Singles Plus (Ace CDLUX 002, 2009)
