= Lee McBee =

American singer

Lee McBee (March 23, 1951 – June 24, 2014) was an American electric blues musician, singer and harmonica player from Kansas City, Missouri.

Though he was primarily a regional blues act in the midwest, McBee gained national attention in the late 1980s and early 1990s for his work with Mike Morgan and the Crawl and with his band the Passions. These bands toured the United States, Canada, and Europe and recorded on major blues labels. McBee grew up in Kansas City and collected blues and soul records throughout the 1960s. In 1969, he moved to Lawrence, Kansas, and worked in many blues and blues rock bands, including Bob Wire and the Worm Ranch Wranglers, Screaming Lee and the Rocktones, Used Parts, and the Lynch-McBee Band, up to 1982. During this period, McBee worked as a fat dropper at the Stokely plant in Lawrence and later as a cook at the Cornucopia Café, in Lawrence, Kansas.

Beginning in 1982, McBee moved to Chicago, Dallas and Los Angeles and recorded and performed with Bonnie Raitt, Jimmy Rogers, Doug Sahm and Johnny Winter. By the mid 1980s, he had settled in Dallas. He met the guitarist Mike Morgan in 1985, and they formed the Crawl. They would be together for the next twelve years. In 1994, McBee began a side project with the Passions. This band relocated to Kansas City and soon evolved into Lee McBee and the Confessors. Throughout the 2000s, McBee and his band toured northeast Kansas and northwest Missouri and released two albums.

McBee was inducted into the Kansas Music Hall of Fame in 2009.

He died on June 24, 2014.
