= Randy McAllister =

American songwriter

- Born: Dallas, Texas, United States
- Genres: Blues; Americana
- Occupations: Musician; singer; songwriter
- Instruments: Vocals; drums; harmonica
- Years active: Late 1980s–present
- Label: JSP
- Website: www.randymcallister.com

Randy McAllister is an American blues and Americana singer-songwriter. He was nominated for a Grammy Award for his 2002 album, Givers and Takers.

Living Blues noted that McAllister is a "first rate drummer, harmonica player and potently soulful singer. His well crafted songs reveal a depth of creativity not only in the storytelling, social commentary and word play, but also in the sophisticated arrangements and blurring of stylistic boundaries. With an expressive vocal register falling somewhere between the soulful effervescence of Al Green and the blunt hammer of Johnny Taylor, a shrewd wit and admirable turn of a phrase, McAllister cements himself as a blues bard archetype".

To date he has released 13 original albums and two compilations. In concert, McAllister has been known to simultaneously sing, plays drums while barefoot, plus manage washboard and harmonica.

== Life and career ==
Born in Dallas, Texas, United States, McAllister was raised in small-town Novice, Texas. He is a fifth generation Texan, whose father was a fireman and part-time blues drummer. The young McAllister purchased his first drum-kit for $40 having earned sufficient funds from mowing neighbor's lawns. By his early twenties, he graduated from the drums to playing the harmonica while stationed in Bedford, Massachusetts, when serving in the United States Air Force. He finished his tour of duty and moved back to Texas in 1984. Having taken further advice and tuition from Earring George Mayweather, McAllister relocated in 1989 to Alaska and spent three years playing in various local bands. He moved back to Texas in 1992, establishing a reputation as a harmonicist, vocalist and a songwriter. In the Dallas, Texas blues scene at that time, McAllister was compared by one author to a young Charlie Musselwhite.

He became friends with Mike Morgan, Andrew "Jr. Boy" Jones and Robin Sylar. McAllister sometimes fronted Morgan's band, The Crawl, both playing harmonica and singing. Through Jones affiliation with the British record label JSP Records, in 1997 McAllister signed his own recording contract and went on to release four albums with them. McAllister's debut album, Diggin' for Sofa Change, was produced by Jones who also played guitar. McAllister's songwriting has been noted to contain heartbreak, humor, and tall tales.

His trio of JSP releases were completed by Grease, Grit, Dirt & Spit (1998) and Double Rectified Bust Head (1999). Various other following albums were released through McAllister's own label, Freedom First Records. In June 2001, McAllister performed at Jazz in June in Norman, Oklahoma. He was nominated for a Grammy Award for his 2002 album, Givers and Takers. In 2008, McAllister provided guitar work on Mike Morgan's album, Stronger Every Day (Severn Records).

In 2013, McAllister issued the compilation Crappy Food No Sleep a Van & Some Great Songs, which introduced his road band on disc for the first time. They are dubbed the Scrappiest Band in the Motherland. Gristle To Gold (2015) followed with a similar backing arrangement.

Fistful of Gumption (2016) on Reaction Records was McAllister's 11th original album. All but one of the tracks was written by McAllister, although the second track, "Time for the Sun to Rise," was penned by Earl King. The final cut, "East Texas Scrapper," includes the prophetic lyrics "You can't outlast me / You can't wear me down / My super power is persistence / And I keep on sticking around."

== Discography ==
Year	Title	Record label
1997	Diggin' for Sofa Change	JSP Records
1998	Grease, Grit, Dirt & Spit	JSP Records
1999	Double Rectified Bust Head	JSP Records
2002	Givers and Takers	Freedom First Records
2006	Flying High While Staying Low Down (compilation album)	Freedom First Records
2007	Temporary Fixes	Freedom First Records
2007	A Little Left of Centre	(Import)
2007	Dope Slap Soup	Reaction Records
2008	Ain't Like the Movies	Reaction Records
2010	Be Like Water	(Import)
2013	Crappy Food No Sleep a Van & Some Great Songs (compilation album)	JSP Records
2015	Gristle to Gold	Reaction Records
2016	Fistful of Gumption	Reaction Records
2017	Triggers Be Trippin	Reaction Records
2021	Paperbag Salvation	Reaction Records
