= Overclocked (album) =

Studio album by Jim Allchin
- Released: September 13, 2011
- Recorded: 2011 at Glenn Sound and Studio 3038, Seattle, Washington
- Genre: Blues rock
- Length: 50:59
- Label: Sandy Key Music LLC
- Producer: Jim Allchin, Glenn Lorbecki, Eric Oz

Jim Allchin chronology
Overclocked (2011)	Q.E.D. (2013)

Overclocked is the first widely available studio album by American blues rock musician and computer scientist Jim Allchin. It was released on September 13, 2011 by Sandy Key Music. The title of the album and first track is a reference to overclocking – deliberately increasing the clock speed of a CPU past the rated amount – resulting in a faster system while generating increased heat often requiring additional cooling.

== Reception ==
Overclocked received widespread positive comments and ratings by reviewers.

== Track listing ==
No.	Title	Writer(s)	Length
1.	"Overclocked"	Jim Allchin	3:04
2.	"Willow Tree"	Jim Allchin	4:08
3.	"Back in the Swamp"	Jim Allchin	3:44
4.	"Don't Tell Me What to Do"	Jim Allchin	3:18
5.	"One for the Money"	Jim Allchin	3:57
6.	"Fall"	Jim Allchin	4:13
7.	"Dr. J"	Jim Allchin	3:13
8.	"Mr. Unknown"	Jim Allchin	4:50
9.	"Flirt"	Jim Allchin	3:40
10.	"Perfect Game"	Jim Allchin	5:39
11.	"Just Playin' With Me"	Jim Allchin	2:56
12.	"The One"	Jim Allchin	3:45
13.	"Opening My Eyes to Love"	Jim Allchin	4:32

== Personnel ==
Musicians

- Jim Allchin – guitar, vocals, arrangements
- Chris Leighton and Ben Smith – drums, percussion
- Garey Shelton – bass
- Ty Ballie and David Gross – keyboard

Guest musicians

- Keely Whitney – vocals on "One for the Money" and "Perfect Game"
- Martin Ros, Mycle Wastman, Keely Whitney – background vocals
- Colin Pulkrabek – trombone
- Josh Gailey – trumpet
- Scott Macpherson – tenor sax
- New York Brass – horns

Additional personnel

- Glenn Lorbecki – production assistance, engineering, mixing
- Eric Oz – production assistance, engineering, mixing
- James Nixon – engineering
- Glenn Lorbecki – rhythm guitar
- Ed Brooks – mastering, RFI, Seattle
- Susan Doupe – photography
