= Kessler Theater =

American theater

Coordinates: 32.7493°N 96.8425°W

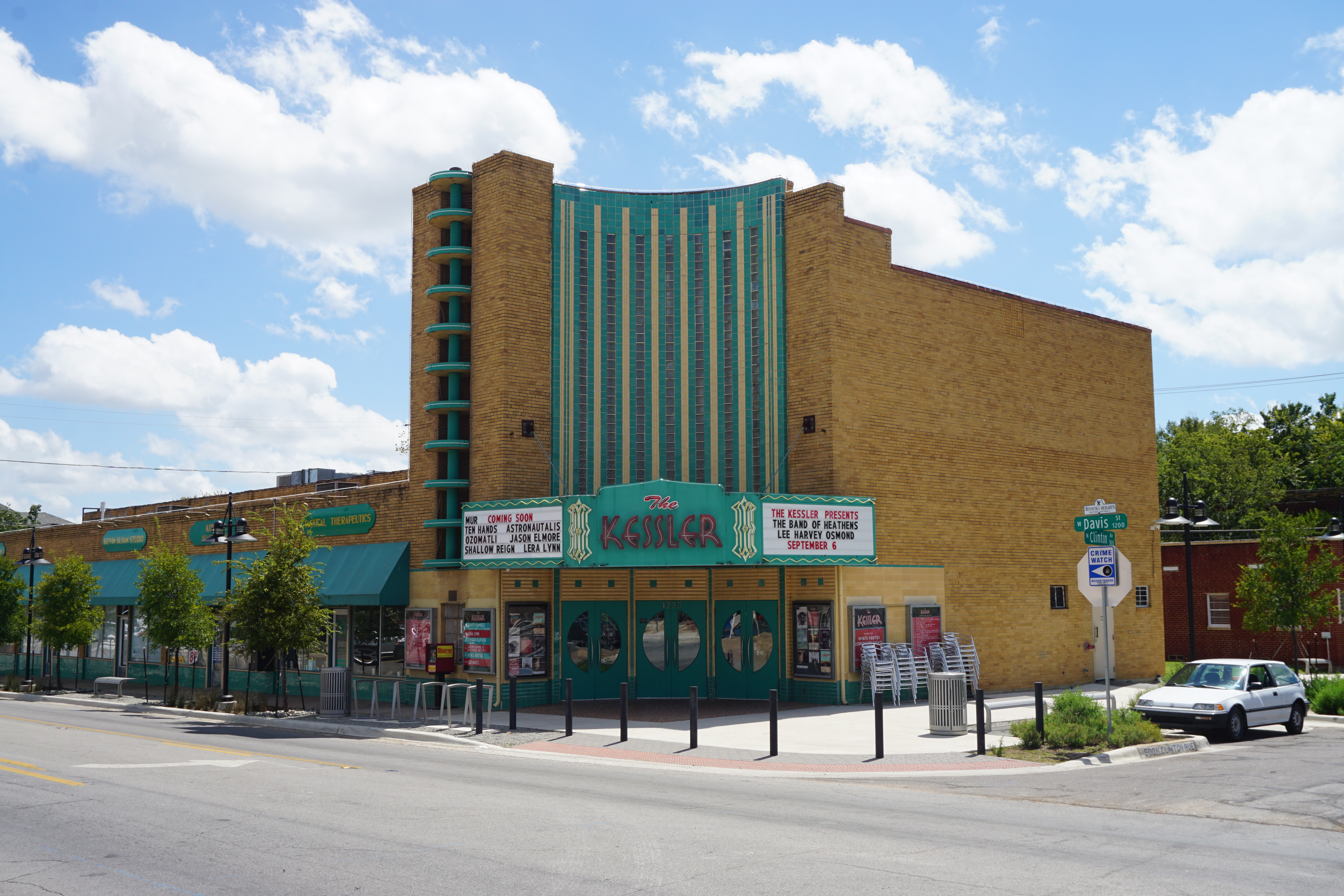
- Kessler Theater
- Address: 1230 W Davis St. Dallas
- Capacity: 500
- Opened: 1941

Website
- thekessler.org

The Kessler Theater is a historic entertainment venue, originally constructed in 1941, and located in the Winnetka Heights neighborhood of Oak Cliff, Dallas, Texas.

== History ==
The Kessler initially served as a neighborhood movie house, providing entertainment to residents of Oak Cliff and surrounding areas. Gene Autry, who owned several theaters in Oak Cliff, bought it in 1945. A tornado hit the building in 1957, and a fire around 1960 put the theater out of commission.

In 2010, the theatre underwent a major renovation led by preservationist Edwin Cabaniss and musician Jeff Liles, with the goal of restoring its original condition and transforming it into a live music venue. The renovation project received widespread community support and funding from various sources, including private donors and government grants.

== Architecture ==
The Kessler Theater was designed by renowned Dallas architect George Dahl and built in the Art Deco style; it features a distinctive marquee, intricate detailing, and an auditorium with a capacity of approximately 400 guests. The interior displays original elements such as ornate moldings, vibrant murals, and a grand stage adorned with velvet curtains.
