= Living Colour discography =

- Studio albums: 6
- Extended plays: 2
- Singles: 21
- Music videos: 18

The official discography of Living Colour, an American funk metal band.

== Albums ==
=== Studio albums ===
Title	Album details	Peak chart positions										Certifications (sales threshold)
Title	Album details	US	AUS	GER	AUT	NL	NOR	NZ	SWE	SWI	UK	Certifications (sales threshold)
Vivid	Release date: May 3, 1988; Label: Epic; Formats: LP, CD, cassette	6	52	—	—	92	15	2	—	—	—	CAN: Platinum; NZ: Gold; US: 2× Platinum
Time's Up	Release date: August 28, 1990; Label: Epic; Formats: LP, CD, cassette	13	15	56	—	24	13	10	—	11	20	AUS: Gold; CAN: Gold; US: Gold
Stain	Release date: March 2, 1993; Label: Epic; Formats: CD, cassette	26	18	29	25	8	—	10	42	14	19	
Collideøscope	Release date: October 7, 2003; Label: Sanctuary; Formats: CD	—	—	—	—	—	—	—	—	—	—	
The Chair in the Doorway	Release date: September 15, 2009; Label: Megaforce; Formats: CD, download	161	—	—	—	—	—	—	—	—	—	
Shade	Release date: September 8, 2017; Label: Megaforce; Formats: LP, CD, download	—	—	—	—	119	—	—	—	25	—	
"—" denotes releases that did not chart

=== Live albums ===
Title	Album details
Dread	Release date: 1994; Label: Import Japan; Formats: CD, cassette
Live from CBGB's	Release date: January 11, 2005; Label: Legacy; Formats: CD, download
Instant Live	Release date: February 5, 2005; Label: Instant Live; Formats: CD, download
CBGB OMFUG Masters: August 19, 2005 The Bowery Collection	Release date: October 28, 2008; Label: Celluloid; Formats: CD, download
The Paris Concert	Release date: March 10, 2009; Label: In-Akustik; Formats: CD, download

=== Compilation albums ===
Title	Album details	Peak chart positions
Title	Album details	AUS
Pride	Release date: November 14, 1995; Label: Epic; Formats: CD, cassette	70
Super Hits	Release date: January 27, 1998; Label: Epic/Legacy; Formats: CD, cassette	—
Play It Loud	Release date: April 28, 1998; Label: Sony Music Distribution; Formats: CD, cassette	—
What's Your Favorite Color?: Remixes, B-Sides and Rarities	Release date: April 5, 2005; Label: Sony Music Distribution; Formats: CD, music download	—
Everything Is Possible: The Very Best of Living Colour	Release date: January 17, 2006; Label: Epic/Legacy; Formats: CD, download	—

== Extended plays ==
Title	EP details	Peak chart positions			
Title	EP details	US	AUS	NL	SWI
Biscuits^{†}	Release date: July 16, 1991; Label: Epic; Formats: CD, cassette	110	25	43	32
Who Shot Ya?	Release date: September 9, 2016; Label: LC Productions; Formats: CD, download	—	—	—	—

^{†}The Sony Music Japan edition of this disc had nine extra tracks not available on the international editions, making Biscuits a compilation album.

== Singles ==
Year	Single	Peak chart positions								Album
Year	Single	US	US Main	US Alt	US Dan	AUS	NL	NZ	UK	Album
1988	"Middle Man"	—	—	—	—	—	—	—	—	Vivid
1988	"Cult of Personality"	13	9	—	—	54	—	3	67	Vivid
1989	"Glamour Boys"	31	26	—	—	—	31	14	83	Vivid
1989	"Open Letter (To a Landlord)"	82	11	—	—	116	—	11	—	Vivid
1989	"Funny Vibe"	—	—	—	—	—	—	—	—	Vivid
1990	"Type"	—	5	3	—	121	—	—	75	Time's Up
1991	"Love Rears Its Ugly Head"	—	28	8	—	10	16	—	12	Time's Up
1991	"Solace of You"	—	—	—	—	69	27	—	33	Time's Up
1991	"Elvis Is Dead"	—	—	25	18	—	—	—	—	Time's Up
1991	"Pride"	—	42	—	—	—	—	—	—	Time's Up
1991	"Time's Up"	—	—	—	—	—	—	—	—	Time's Up
1992	"Talkin' Loud and Sayin' Nothing"	—	—	12	—	—	85	—	—	Biscuits (EP)
1993	"Leave It Alone"	—	14	4	—	59	41	20	34	Stain
1993	"Ausländer"	—	—	—	—	—	—	—	53	Stain
1993	"Nothingness"	—	—	17	—	85	—	28	76	Stain
1993	"Bi"	—	—	—	—	79	—	—	—	Stain
1994	"Sunshine of Your Love"	—	—	—	—	56	—	22	—	True Lies soundtrack
2003	"Song Without Sin"	—	—	—	—	—	—	—	—	Collideøscope
2009	"Behind the Sun"	—	—	—	—	—	—	—	—	The Chair in the Doorway
2017	"Come On"	—	—	—	—	—	—	—	—	Shade
2017	"Program"	—	—	—	—	—	—	—	—	Shade
"—" denotes releases that did not chart

== Video albums ==
Title	Album details	Certifications (sales threshold)
Primer	Release date: 1989; Label: CBS Records; Formats: VHS, LD	US: Gold
Time Tunnel	Release date: 1991; Label: Sony Music Video; Formats: VHS	
Video Hits	Release date: 2006; Label: Sony BMG; Formats: DVD	
On Stage at World Cafe Live	Release date: May 8, 2007; Label: Decca; Format: DVD	
The Paris Concert	Release date: November 11, 2008; Label: In-Akustik; Format: DVD	

== Music videos ==
Year	Song	Director(s)
1988	"Middle Man"	Drew Carolan
1988	"Cult of Personality"	Drew Carolan
1989	"Glamour Boys"	Graham Elliott, John England
1989	"Open Letter (To a Landlord)"	Drew Carolan
1989	"Funny Vibe"	Charles Stone III
1990	"Love Rears Its Ugly Head"	Unknown
1990	"Type"	Unknown
1990	"Elvis Is Dead"	Unknown
1991	"Sailin' On"	Unknown
1991	"Solace of You"	Matt Mahurin
1992	"Time's Up"	Matt Mahurin
1993	"Leave It Alone"	Kevin Kerslake
1993	"Ausländer"	Eric Zimmerman
1993	"Nothingness"	Unknown
1993	"Bi"	Unknown
1994	"Sunshine of Your Love"	Nigel Dick
2003	"Song Without Sin"	Unknown
2016	"Who Shot Ya?"	Unknown

== Other appearances ==
Title	Album details	Song
Judgment Night	Release date: September 14, 1993; Label: Epic; Format: CD	"Me, Myself, & My Microphone" with Run DMC
Stone Free: A Tribute to Jimi Hendrix	Release date: November 9, 1993; Label: Reprise; Format: CD	"Crosstown Traffic"
True Lies	Release date: July 19, 1994; Label: Lightstorm/Epic Soundtrax; Format: CD	"Sunshine of Your Love"
