= Everything Is Possible: The Very Best of Living Colour =

Greatest hits album by Living Colour
- Released: January 17, 2006
- Recorded: 1987–2003
- Genre: Funk metal, heavy metal, hard rock, alternative metal
- Length: 1:16:34
- Label: Epic/Legacy

Living Colour chronology
What's Your Favorite Color? (2005)	Everything Is Possible: The Very Best of Living Colour (2006)	On Stage At World Cafe Live (2007)

Professional ratings
Review scores
Source	Rating
AllMusic	4.5/5 stars

Everything Is Possible: The Very Best of Living Colour is a greatest hits compilation by Living Colour, released in 2006. The title is taken from a lyric in the song "Type." Everything is possible, but nothing is real.

== Track listing ==
Tracks 1–6 are from Vivid. Tracks 7–11 are from Time's Up. Tracks 12 and 13 are from Stain. Other tracks from releases noted.

No.	Title	Length
1.	"Cult of Personality"	4:54
2.	"Open Letter (To a Landlord)"	5:31
3.	"Funny Vibe"	4:21
4.	"Glamour Boys"	3:41
5.	"Middle Man"	3:48
6.	"Memories Can't Wait"	4:30
7.	"Elvis Is Dead"	3:50
8.	"Type"	6:27
9.	"Solace of You"	3:35
10.	"Pride"	4:54
11.	"Time's Up"	3:05
12.	"Go Away"	4:02
13.	"Nothingness"	3:31
14.	"Burning of the Midnight Lamp" (Originally from the Biscuits EP)	5:29
15.	"Sunshine of Your Love" (Originally from the True Lies soundtrack)	5:14
16.	"Flying" (Originally from Collideøscope)	4:24
17.	"Love Rears Its Ugly Head" (Soulpower Hip Hop Remix, Originally from What's Your Favorite Color?: Remixes, B-Sides and Rarities)	5:09

== Personnel ==
- Corey Glover - vocals, rhythm guitar (track 8)
- Vernon Reid - lead guitar
- Will Calhoun - drums
- Muzz Skillings - bass (tracks 1–11, 14 & 17)
- Doug Wimbish - bass (tracks 12, 13, 15 & 16)
