= Pride (Living Colour album) =

Greatest hits album by Living Colour
- Released: November 14, 1995
- Recorded: 1987–1994
- Genre: Alternative metal; funk metal
- Length: 74:39
- Label: Epic

Living Colour chronology
Stain (1993)	Pride (1995)	Collideøscope (2003)

Pride is a compilation album by the American rock band Living Colour, released on November 14, 1995. In addition to some of their most commercially successful songs, the album includes four rare tracks recorded for the follow-up to their third album, Stain.

The collection is out of print; problems with the rights ownership make a reissue unlikely.

== Critical reception ==
Professional ratings
Review scores
Source	Rating
AllMusic	4.5/5 stars
The Encyclopedia of Popular Music	4/5 stars
Entertainment Weekly	B
MusicHound Rock: The Essential Album Guide	3/5 stars
(The New) Rolling Stone Album Guide	4/5 stars

Entertainment Weekly wrote that "singles like 'Type' and 'Glamour Boys', and Vernon Reid’s dive-bomber guitar, amount to one mighty legacy." The Commercial Appeal opined: "Much of the Pride collection is just depressing, documenting the death of a promising band. So, unless you're a devoted fan, skip this one and use the bucks to replace your scarred copy of Vivid."

== Track listing ==
No.	Title	Length
1.	"Pride"	4:55
2.	"Release the Pressure"	4:15
3.	"Sacred Ground"	3:47
4.	"Visions"	4:35
5.	"Love Rears Its Ugly Head" (Soulpower Remix)	6:13
6.	"These Are Happy Times"	5:27
7.	"Memories Can't Wait (Live)" (Talking Heads cover)	5:05
8.	"Cult of Personality"	4:53
9.	"Funny Vibe"	3:53
10.	"WTFF"	2:04
11.	"Glamour Boys"	3:40
12.	"Open Letter (To a Landlord)"	5:32
13.	"Solace of You"	3:35
14.	"Nothingness"	3:30
15.	"Type"	6:26
16.	"Time's Up"	3:07
17.	"What's Your Favorite Color? (Theme Song)"	4:42

Australian limited edition
No.	Title	Writer(s)	Length
1.	"Cult of Personality" (live)	Corey Glover; Muzz Skillings; Vernon Reid; Will Calhoun	4:55
2.	"Burning of the Midnight Lamp"	Jimi Hendrix	5:31
3.	"Ausländer"	Corey Glover; Doug Wimbish; Vernon Reid; Will Calhoun	2:38
4.	"Sunshine of Your Love"	Eric Clapton; Jack Bruce; Pete Brown	5:16
5.	"Final Solution" (Pere Ubu cover)	Craig Bell; David Taylor; David Thomas; Peter Laughner; Scott Krauss; Tim Wright; Tom Herman	4:31
6.	"Nothingness" (Colour Mix)	Will Calhoun	3:50
7.	"New Jack Theme" (live)	Vernon Reid	5:08

- Tracks 2–4 and 6 are previously unreleased.
- Tracks 8, 9, 11, 12, and 17 are from Vivid.
- Tracks 1, 13, 15, and 16 are from Time's Up.
- Tracks 10 and 14 are from Stain.
- Track 7 is from the Biscuits EP.
- Track 5 was released as a single.

Australian limited edition

- Tracks 1, 5, 6 and 7 previously unreleased.
- Track 2 is from the Biscuits EP.
- Track 3 is from Stain.
- Track 4 is from the True Lies Soundtrack.

== Charts ==
Chart performance for Pride
Chart (1995)	Peak position
Australian Albums (ARIA)	70
