= Dread (album) =

Live album by Living Colour
- Released: Sept. 23, 1993
- Recorded: On Tour in 1993
- Genre: Funk metal, heavy metal
- Length: 68:21

Living Colour chronology
Stain (1993)	Dread (1993)	Pride (1995)

Dread is a live album by Living Colour released only in Japan September 23, 1993. It contains live recordings from the Stain tour, an acoustic radio session and two B-sides. The live recordings were recorded on 7 June 1993 at Le Zenith in Paris, France, and at a concert on 24 April 1993 at the Riviera Theatre in Chicago. The radio session was recorded for a Dutch radio show called Countdown Café in February 1993. Both of the B-sides were recorded during the Stain sessions.

== Track listing ==
No.	Title	Length
1.	"Leave It Alone" (Live in Paris 1993)	3:38
2.	"Time's Up" (Live in Paris 1993)	3:36
3.	"Go Away" (Live in Paris 1993)	4:01
4.	"Funny Vibe" (Live in Chicago 1993)	4:46
5.	"Ausländer" (Live in Paris 1993)	5:21
6.	"Middle Man" (Live in Chicago 1993)	3:41
7.	"Cult of Personality" (Live in Paris 1993)	4:44
8.	"Nothingness" (Live in Chicago 1993)	4:11
9.	"Postman" (Live in Chicago 1993)	3:34
10.	"This Little Pig" (Live in Chicago 1993)	5:24
11.	"Never Satisfied" (Dutch Radio Session 1993)	4:20
12.	"Love Rears Its Ugly Head" (Dutch Radio Session 1993)	4:17
13.	"Open Letter (To a Landlord)" (Dutch Radio Session 1993)	6:13
14.	"Nothingness" (Dutch Radio Session 1993)	3:28
15.	"17 Days"	3:00
16.	"TV News"	4:14

== Personnel ==
- Corey Glover – vocals
- Vernon Reid – guitar
- Doug Wimbish – bass
- Will Calhoun – drums
