= Primer (video) =

Video by Living Colour
- Released: 1989
- Genre: Funk metal, heavy metal, hard rock
- Label: CBS

Living Colour chronology
Primer (1989)	Time Tunnel (1991)

Professional ratings
Review scores
Source	Rating
Allmusic	3/5 stars

Primer is an early home video documenting the funk metal band Living Colour and the making of its platinum selling album Vivid. The video includes a collection of songs from Vivid and observations on the songs from band members. The live track "Broken Hearts" was filmed by MTV during a 1988 concert at Auburn University in Alabama. Released in 1989 on VHS tape and laserdisc, the video never made it to DVD and has long been out of print. The video for "Glamour Boys" was not included on the laserdisc version.

== Track listing ==
1. "Middle Man"
2. "Cult of Personality"
3. "Funny Vibe"
4. "Broken Hearts" (Live)
5. "Open Letter (To a Landlord)"
6. "Glamour Boys"

== Certifications ==
Country	Certification	Date	Sales certified
U.S.	Gold	July 11, 1989	50,000

== Personnel ==
- Corey Glover - vocals
- Vernon Reid - guitar
- Muzz Skillings - bass
- Will Calhoun - drums
