= Live from CBGB's =

Live from CBGB

Live album by Living Colour
- Released: January 11, 2005
- Recorded: December 19, 1989
- Genre: Hard rock; funk; thrash metal
- Label: Epic
- Producer: Jeff Magid, Vernon Reid

Living Colour chronology
Collideøscope (2003)	Live from CBGB (2005)	Instant Live: Avalon, Boston, MA 10/17/04 (2005)

Live from CBGB is a live album by Living Colour recorded live on December 19, 1989 at the CBGB club, but not released until January 11, 2005 by Epic Records. This concert was the band's homecoming after experiencing worldwide success with the studio album Vivid throughout 1988 and 1989.

The show features a wealth of new material that would soon be released on their Grammy winning follow-up album Time's Up the following year. This album is the only Living Colour album to feature "Soldier's Blues," "Little Lies," and a cover of the Bad Brains classic "Sailin' On."

== Track listing ==
All tracks are written by Vernon Reid, except where noted.

No.	Title	Writer(s)	Length
1.	"Cult of Personality"	Reid, Muzz Skillings, Corey Glover, Will Calhoun	5:35
2.	"Pride"	Calhoun	4:57
3.	"Someone Like You"	Skillings	3:59
4.	"Fight the Fight"	Calhoun, Glover, Reid, Skillings	5:21
5.	"Funny Vibe"		4:38
6.	"Sailin' On" (Bad Brains cover)	H.R., Dr. Know, Darryl Jenifer, Earl Hudson	2:11
7.	"Information Overload"		6:14
8.	"Love Rears Its Ugly Head"		4:14
9.	"Soldier's Blues"		6:43
10.	"Open Letter (To a Landlord)"	Reid, Tracie Morris	7:16
11.	"Solace of You"	Glover, Reid	4:17
12.	"Middle Man"	Glover, Reid	3:47
13.	"Little Lies"		7:46

== Personnel ==
- Corey Glover – lead vocals
- Vernon Reid – guitar, backing vocals
- Muzz Skillings – bass, backing vocals
- Will Calhoun – drums, backing vocals, percussion
