= Instant Live: Avalon, Boston, MA 10/17/04 =

Live album by Living Colour
- Released: February 5, 2005
- Recorded: October 17, 2004
- Genre: Funk metal
- Label: Instant Live

Living Colour chronology
Live from CBGB's (2005)	Instant Live: Avalon, Boston, MA 10/17/04 (2005)	What's Your Favorite Color?: Remixes, B-Sides and Rarities (2005)

Instant Live: Avalon, Boston, MA 10/17/04 is a live album by Living Colour. It was recorded on the band's 2003–04 tour in support of their studio album Collideøscope. It features excerpts from the show, including several songs off Collideøscope, a few old classics, and the only officially available version of the song "Terrorism".

Professional ratings
Review scores
Source	Rating
AllMusic	link

== Track listing ==
No.	Title	Length
1.	"Type"	8:16
2.	"In Your Name"	5:35
3.	"Funny Vibe"	4:37
4.	"A ? of When"	4:00
5.	"Middle Man"	3:46
6.	"Sacred Ground"	7:23
7.	"Memories Can't Wait"	6:10
8.	"Terrorism"	3:41
9.	"Time's Up"	4:21
10.	"Cult of Personality"	5:18

== Personnel ==
- Corey Glover – vocals
- Vernon Reid – guitar
- Doug Wimbish – bass guitar
- Will Calhoun – drums
