= The Chair in the Doorway =

Studio album by Living Colour
- Released: September 15, 2009
- Genre: Funk metal; experimental rock; alternative metal; pop metal
- Length: 45:43
- Label: Megaforce

Living Colour chronology
What's Your Favorite Color?: Remixes, B-Sides and Rarities (2005)	The Chair in the Doorway (2009)	Shade (2017)

Professional ratings
Review scores
Source	Rating
AllMusic	2.5/5 stars
Billboard	3/5 stars
MetalSucks	4/5 stars
PopMatters	8/10 stars
Robert Christgau	(2-star Honorable Mention)
Rolling Stone	Link
Sputnikmusic	3.5/5

The Chair in the Doorway is the fifth studio album by American rock band Living Colour, released on September 15, 2009. It was the band's first studio album since the release of Collideøscope in 2003, and their first release on Megaforce Records. The album met generally positive reviews and sold about 2,800 copies in its first week landing at #161 on the Billboard 200. This is their first album to chart since Stain in 1993.

"Bless Those (Little Annie's Prayer)", which was co-written by Annie Bandez and Doug Wimbish, was originally recorded and released on Little Annie's 1992 album Short and Sweet. Mark Stewart included a version of the song "Method" on his 2012 album The Politics of Envy.

== Track listing ==
All tracks are written by Living Colour, along with those noted below.

No.	Title	Writer(s)	Length
1.	"Burned Bridges"		3:37
2.	"The Chair"	Count	2:09
3.	"Decadance"	Milan Cimfe, Mark Stewart	3:20
4.	"Young Man"	Mark Stewart	2:53
5.	"Method"	Milan Cimfe, Mark Stewart	4:20
6.	"Behind the Sun"	Count	3:40
7.	"Bless Those (Little Annie's Prayer)"	Doug Wimbish, Annie Bandez	5:04
8.	"Hard Times"		2:48
9.	"That's What You Taught Me"		3:45
10.	"Out of My Mind"	Mark Stewart	3:42
11.	"Not Tomorrow"		3:01
12.	"(4 minutes, 33 seconds of silence)" (Hidden track)	John Cage	4:33
13.	"Asshole" (Hidden track)		2:51

== Personnel ==
Living Colour

- Corey Glover – lead and backing vocals
- Vernon Reid – electric, acoustic and electronic guitars, laptop; backing vocals on "That's What You Taught Me"
- Doug Wimbish – bass, ambience, guitars, beats, vocals
- Will Calhoun – drums, percussion, wave drum, toy piano, keyboards; backing vocals on "Not Tomorrow"

Additional musicians

- Becca de Beauport – keyboards on "That's What You Taught Me" and vocals on "Not Tomorrow"

== Charts ==
Chart (2009)	Peak position
US Billboard 200	161
US Independent Albums (Billboard)	27
