= Push It (Salt-n-Pepa song) =

1987 song by Salt-n-Pepa

- German 12-inch single

Single by Salt-N-Pepa

from the album Hot, Cool & Vicious
- Released: March 8, 1987
- Genre: Hip hop; pop rap
- Length: 4:31 (album version); 3:28 (UK radio edit)
- Label: Next Plateau; London
- Songwriters: Hurby Azor; Ray Davies
- Producer: Hurby Azor

Salt-N-Pepa singles chronology
"Tramp" (1987)	"Push It" (1987)	"Chick on the Side" (1987)

Music video
- "Push It" on YouTube

Alternative cover
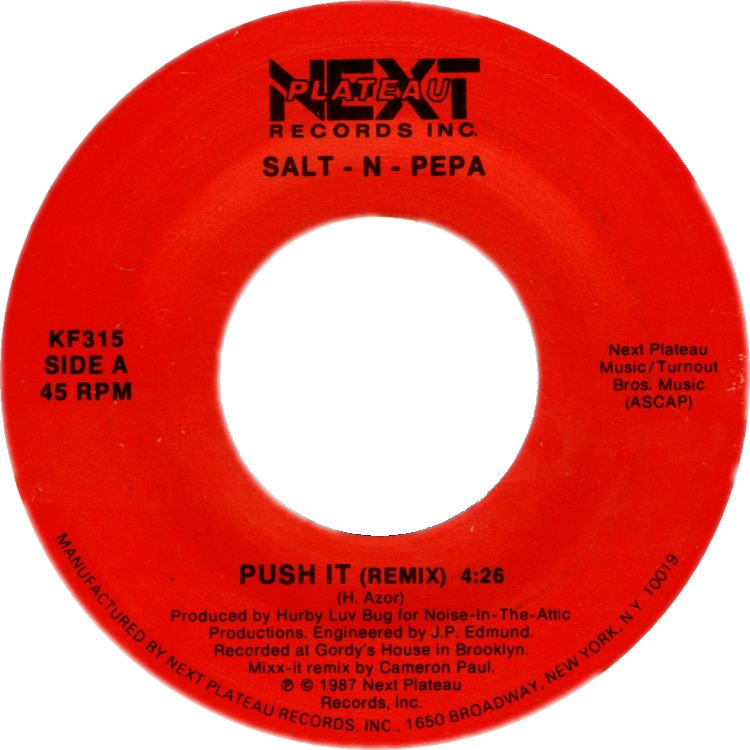
- Side A of US 7-inch retail single

Professional ratings
Review scores
Source	Rating
Number One	4/5 stars

"Push It" is a song by American hip hop group Salt-N-Pepa. It was first released in 1987 as the B-side of the single "Tramp". Then released by Next Plateau and London Records, it peaked at number 19 on the US Billboard Hot 100 in early 1988 and, after initially peaking at number 41 in the UK, it reentered the charts after the group performed the track at the Nelson Mandela 70th Birthday Tribute, eventually peaking at number two in the UK in July 1988. The song has also been certified platinum by the Recording Industry Association of America (RIAA). The song ranks 446th on Rolling Stone's list of the "500 Greatest Songs of All Time" and ranked ninth on VH1's "100 Greatest Songs of Hip Hop".

== History ==
The original version of "Push It" was released as the B-side to the 12-inch single "Tramp" in 1987. The corresponding 7-inch single contained a "Mixx-It" remix by San Francisco DJ and producer Cameron Paul; this was the radio version that gave the group its first mainstream hit. It advanced into the US Billboard Top 40 the week of December 26, 1987, eventually reaching its peak of number 19 the week of February 20, 1988. "Push It" and "Let's Talk About Sex" tie as the group's highest-charting UK hit, both peaking at number two in that country.

The original 1986 edition of the album Hot, Cool & Vicious did not contain "Push It". When the Cameron Paul remix of "Push It" became a radio hit, the album was reissued with the "Push It" remix, along with the original versions of "Tramp" and "Chick on the Side" replaced by remixes.

== Lyrics ==
The song quotes a line from "You Really Got Me" by the Kinks, with the word "girl" replaced by "boy": "Boy, you really got me goin'/You got me so I don't know what I'm doin'." (For this, Ray Davies received a songwriting credit for "Push It.") It also quotes "Pick up on this" from "I'm a Greedy Man" and "There it is" from "There It Is", both by James Brown. The whispered "Push it" is sampled from the band Coal Kitchen's 1977 recording "Keep on Pushin'". The song is in A minor.

== Recognition and sales ==
"Push It" was nominated for Best Rap Performance at the 31st Annual Grammy Awards. It was certified gold on March 23, 1988, by the RIAA for selling a million units. It was certified platinum on October 13, 1989, under the new threshold for singles, which had been lowered to 1,000,000 sales earlier that year.

== Critical reception ==
Paul Oldfield from Melody Maker wrote, "'Push It' is an android electro pulse within earshot of Devo's pin-head synthesiser programmes, little pneumatic gasps and Mellotron drones like a motor in low-gear distress. It doesn't sound as if it's 'working up a sweat' at all. Forget riddim, forget rap. This is harder." Another editor, Paul Lester, said the song "is to hip hop what M's 'Pop Musik' and Trio's 'Da Da Da' were to electro-pop." Edwin Pouncey from NME wrote, "The golden girls of rap decide to head off in a 'new direction'. This involves carefully ripping off a strip of Devo's 'Whip It' anthem of yore and pasting it onto the side of a riff that veers near the music for a John Carpenter movie that never was... I'm fond of both sources so Salt N'Peppa finally succeed in wriggling under my skin. Whether they intend to stay seems pretty doubtful however."

Debbi Voller from Number One wrote, "Bound to be a big hit in the present hip hop/house/rap mania climate, and why not? 'Push It' pumps and grinds like a street version of James Brown's classic 'Sex Machine' and these gals can rap a mean, errr, rap!" Robin Smith from Record Mirror named it Single of the Week, writing, "Salt-n-Pepa produce enough energy to put life into a stuffed chimpanzee. 'Push It' is as sharp as a broken bottle on a mean city street, with forceful rhymes and heavyweight rhythms that just won't let up. If I was LL Cool J I'd put my gold chains in a safe and hide in a cupboard at home."

== Music video ==
The "Push It" video features a concert performance of the song, along with DJ Spinderella and Hurby "Luv Bug" Azor on keyboards and backing vocals. The group wears eight-ball jackets in the video.

== Legacy ==
In October 2000, VH1 ranked "Push It" 37th on its list of "100 Greatest Dance Songs". On its list of "100 Greatest Songs of Hip Hop", it ranked ninth. In 2011 and 2017, Rolling Stone magazine ranked the song 446th and 46th on its lists of the "500 Greatest Songs of All Time" and "100 Greatest Hip-Hop Songs of All Time". In 2020, Slant Magazine ranked it 31st on its list of "The 100 Best Dance Songs of All Time".

== Charts ==
=== Weekly charts ===
Chart (1987–1988)	Peak position
Australia (ARIA)	3
Austria (Ö3 Austria Top 40)	9
Belgium (Ultratop 50 Flanders)	1
Canada Top Singles (RPM)	7
Denmark (IFPI)	14
Europe (Eurochart Hot 100)	3
Finland (Suomen virallinen lista)	16
Iceland (Íslenski Listinn Topp 10)	7
Ireland (IRMA)	6
Netherlands (Dutch Top 40)	1
Netherlands (Single Top 100)	1
New Zealand (Recorded Music NZ)	4
Norway (VG-lista)	4
Spain (AFYVE)	6
Sweden (Sverigetopplistan)	2
Switzerland (Schweizer Hitparade)	6
UK Singles (Official Charts)	2
US Billboard Hot 100	19
US Dance Club Songs (Billboard) with "Tramp"	18
US Dance Singles Sales (Billboard) with "Tramp"	1
US Hot R&B/Hip-Hop Songs (Billboard)	28
West Germany (GfK)	9

=== Year-end charts ===
Chart (1988)	Position
Australia (ARIA)	29
Belgium (Ultratop)	12
Canada Top Singles (RPM)	56
Europe (Eurochart Hot 100)	24
Netherlands (Dutch Top 40)	5
Netherlands (Single Top 100)	5
New Zealand (RIANZ)	42
UK Singles (OCC)	15
US 12-inch Singles Sales (Billboard)	15
West Germany (Media Control)	9

== Certifications ==
Region	Certification	Certified units/sales
Canada (Music Canada)	Gold	50,000^{^}
Sweden (GLF)	Gold	25,000^{^}
United Kingdom (BPI)	Platinum	600,000^{‡}
United States (RIAA)	Platinum	1,000,000^{^}
^{^} Shipments figures based on certification alone.^{‡} Sales+streaming figures based on certification alone.
