= Elvis Is Dead =

Single by Living Colour

from the album Time's Up
- Released: 1990
- Recorded: 1989–1990
- Genre: Jazz rock
- Length: 3:51
- Label: Epic
- Songwriter: Vernon Reid
- Producer: Ed Stasium

Living Colour singles chronology
| "Solace of You" (1990) | "Elvis Is Dead" (1990) | "Pride" (1990) |

Music video
- "Elvis Is Dead" on YouTube

"Elvis Is Dead" is a song by American rock group Living Colour from their second studio album Time's Up (1990). The song was the third single from the album, and features guests Little Richard on vocals and Maceo Parker on saxophone.

The song addresses conspiracies that iconic singer Elvis Presley had actually survived his 1977 death. "Elvis is Dead" also touches on Presley's complex relationship with African-Americans. Before, during, and after Little Richard's guest rap performance, many voices speak the song title, concluded by one announcing: "Elvis has left the building!" Living Colour adapted lyrics from two previous songs. "Maybe I've a reason to believe we all will be received in Graceland" from Paul Simon's "Graceland" to yield the refrain, "I've got a reason to believe we all won't be received at Graceland." They also quote Public Enemy's "Fight the Power" in stating, "Elvis was a hero to most," but again twisted the line "But he never meant s--t to me" to "But that's beside the point."

== Track listing ==
1. "Elvis Is Dead" - 3:51
2. "Memories Can't Wait (Live)" - 5:06
3. "Love And Happiness" - 5:09

== Charts ==
| Chart | Peak |
|---|---|
| U.S. Billboard Alternative Songs | 25 |
| U.S. Billboard Dance Club Songs | 18 |

== Personnel ==
- Will Calhoun - drums
- Corey Glover - vocals
- Maceo Parker - saxophone
- Vernon Reid - guitar
- Little Richard - vocals
- Muzz Skillings - bass
- Mick Jagger - voice at wake
