= There It Is =

There It Is may refer to:

- There It Is (film), a 1928 short film starring Charles R. Bowers
- There It Is (911 album), 1999
- There It Is (James Brown album), 1972
  - "There It Is" (James Brown song)
- "There It Is" (Ginuwine song), 2001
- "There It Is" (Shalamar song), 1982
- "Whoomp! (There It Is)", a song by Tag Team, 1993
- There It Is, 1982 album by African-American poet Jayne Cortez (1934–2012)
