= Shade (Living Colour album) =

Studio album by Living Colour
- Released: September 8, 2017
- Recorded: 2013–2017
- Length: 48:32
- Label: Megaforce
- Producer: Andre Betts

Living Colour chronology
The Chair in the Doorway (2009)	Shade (2017)	Cult of Personality (2024)

Shade is the sixth studio album by American rock band Living Colour, released in 2017. It was their first studio album in eight years, following The Chair in the Doorway (2009).

== Background and production ==
Living Colour began working on Shade about a year after the release of The Chair in the Doorway. In a 2010 interview with The Break Down Room, vocalist Corey Glover hoped that a new Living Colour album would be released in 2011, and stated, "We're going to do something different [for us] and make a real record, right now, right after we've done this one. Imagine that." In a May 2012 interview with Rolling Stone, guitarist Vernon Reid revealed that "Living Colour just got together a few weeks ago – preparing to do a bunch of writing in preparation to make a record for 2013." He added, "Everyone is insanely busy, but it feels so good when we're together and connecting that I really look forward to making the next record."

On June 30, 2014, it was announced that Living Colour's sixth studio album, titled Shade, would be released in the fall. However, the album's release date was later pushed back to early 2015. For unknown reasons, the release of the album would continue to be delayed. Asked in March 2015 about the meaning of the album's title, Glover replied, "As time progresses, a shadow falls, and it's about the progression of time. We're trying to dissect and really take the roots of the music that created us and take it to task."

On the making of Shade, Glover explained to Loudwire in June 2016:

"It took us almost four years to make this record. We went through problems with managers, with record companies and schedules — it just took forever and finally we got it done. I can't wait to get that process over with so I can go back and start working on new stuff again, personally, and just start writing new things. Part of the process was that we weren't going to compromise on a lot of stuff. There were some sonic things that we weren't going to compromise on; we needed to get it right. It took long enough, so hopefully it's right. I mean, we'll still have to fix things — 'right' to us is that you don't go, 'Uh, if only I had done this.' At the same time, there's something about discovering something as you play it that changes it and that makes the difference between the recorded version and the live version. "Cult of Personality" live doesn't sound the way it was recorded because we've been playing it for almost thirty years and it changes based on the environment, the gear and the temperament and all that. I think we're satisfied with Shade for what it is as a recording."

On May 12, 2017, it was announced that Shade would be released on September 8, and its artwork, by Washington, D.C. area artist Anike Robinson, was released.

== Critical reception ==
Professional ratings
Aggregate scores
Source	Rating
Metacritic	74/100
Review scores
Source	Rating
Albumism	3.5/5 stars
AllMusic	3.5/5 stars
Classic Rock	3.5/5 stars
Paste	8.3/10
PopMatters	9/10
Q	3/5 stars
Record Collector	4/5 stars
Rolling Stone	3/5 stars

According to the review aggregator Metacritic, Shade received "generally favorable reviews" based on a weighted average score of 74 out of 100 from 7 critic scores.

== Track listing ==
Shade track listing
No.	Title	Length
1.	"Freedom of Expression (F.O.X.)"	2:54
2.	"Preachin' Blues" (Robert Johnson cover)	4:20
3.	"Come On"	3:22
4.	"Program"	4:43
5.	"Who Shot Ya?" (The Notorious B.I.G. cover)	3:38
6.	"Always Wrong"	4:04
7.	"Blak Out"	2:29
8.	"Pattern in Time"	2:56
9.	"Who's That"	4:10
10.	"Glass Teeth"	2:59
11.	"Invisible"	3:45
12.	"Inner City Blues" (Marvin Gaye cover)	4:00
13.	"Two Sides"	5:12

== Personnel ==
- Corey Glover – vocals
- Vernon Reid – guitars, acoustic guitar
- Doug Wimbish – bass
- Will Calhoun – drums

== Charts ==
Chart (2017)	Peak position
Scottish Albums (Official Charts)	66
Swiss Albums (Schweizer Hitparade)	25
US Independent Albums (Billboard)	15
US Top Album Sales (Billboard)	43
US Top Hard Rock Albums (Billboard)	12
UK Independent Albums (Official Charts)	16
UK Rock & Metal Albums (Official Charts)	7
