= Hymns (Corey Glover album) =

Studio album by Corey Glover
- Released: 1998
- Recorded: 1995
- Studio: Teenage Dog Studio (Brooklyn, NY); BearTracks Recording Studio (Suffern, NY)
- Genre: Rock
- Length: 54:40
- Label: LaFace Records
- Producer: The Family Stand; Corey Glover; Michael Ciro (co.)

Professional ratings
Review scores
Source	Rating
AllMusic	3/5 stars

Hymns is the first solo studio album by Living Colour vocalist Corey Glover. It was released on April 7, 1998, via LaFace Records. The recording sessions took place at Teenage Dog Studio in Brooklyn and at BearTracks in Suffern, NY. The production was handled by Glover and the Family Stand, with L.A. Reid and Babyface serving as executive producers.

== Track listing ==
All tracks are produced by the Family Stand and Corey Glover, except where noted.

No.	Title	Writer(s)	Producer(s)	Length
1.	"Hymn #1017"	Corey Glover	Corey Glover	0:57
2.	"Do You First, Then Do Myself"	Peter Lord	The Family Stand; Glover; Michael Ciro (co.)	4:26
3.	"April Rain"	Glover; Lord		4:53
4.	"Little Girl"	Glover; Howard Alper; Ivan Bodley; Dennis Diamond		5:11
5.	"Hot-Buttered Soul"	Glover; Deatra Haime; Lord		4:54
6.	"Things Are Getting in the Way"	Glover; V. Jeffrey Smith		4:44
7.	"Sidewalk Angel"	Glover; Haime; Lord; Smith; Mike McCoy		4:21
8.	"One"	Glover; Lord		4:27
9.	"Sermon"	Glover; Haime; Lord	The Family Stand; Glover; Ciro (co.)	4:53
10.	"Lowball Express"	Glover; Alper; Diamond; Gary Fritz; McCoy; Bodley		4:47
11.	"Only Time Will Tell"	Glover; Alper; Diamond; Fritz; Haime; McCoy		5:20
12.	"Silence"	Glover; Diamond		5:47
Total length:				54:40

== Personnel ==
Musicians

- Corey Glover – lead vocals, background vocals (3, 6, 7, 9–12)
- Howard Alper – drums (3–7, 10, 11), background vocals (7, 12)
- Delouie Avant – background vocals (6, 7, 9, 11, 12)
- Julien Barber – viola (3, 4, 11)
- Roger Byam – tenor saxophone (6, 11)
- William Calhoun – drums (8)
- Michael Ciro – guitar (2, 8, 9)
- James "2 Tasty" Clisset – harmonica (6)
- Hector Colon – trumpet (6, 11)
- Dennis Diamond – guitar (1, 3–7, 10, 11), sitar (3, 11), talkbox (10), acoustic guitar (12)
- Max Ellen – violin (3, 4, 11)
- Mark Feldman – violin (3, 4)
- Gary Fritz – percussion (3–7, 10)
- Floretta Gibbs – background vocals (4)
- Randy Gilmore – horn arrangements and tenor saxophone (6, 11)
- Juliet Haffner – viola (3, 4, 11)
- Deatra Haime – female speaker (1)
- Gabriel Horns – horns (6, 11)
- Floretta Hudson – background vocals (12)
- Kia Jeffries – female vocalist (5), background vocals (6)
- Booker King – bass guitar
- Richard Locker – cello (11)
- Peter Lord – acoustic guitar (2), piano (3), electric piano (5, 8), background vocals (3, 9, 12), string arrangements (8)
- Joe Mardin – string arrangements and conductor (3, 4, 8, 11), string orchestration (8)
- Michael McCoy – keyboards (4–7, 10, 11), piano (12), background vocals (3, 4, 11, 12)
- Jacci McGhee – background vocals (9)
- Albert Menendez – keyboards (2, 9)
- Idina Menzel – background vocals (12)
- Gene Orloff – concert master and violin (3, 4, 8, 11)
- Sandra Park – violin (3, 4, 11)
- Matthew Raimondi – violin (11)
- Jaime Ramos – trombone (6, 7, 11)
- Nilda Richards – trombone (7)
- Laura Seaton – violin (3, 4)
- V. Jeffrey Smith – rhythm guitar (4–7, 11), baritone saxophone (6, 10, 11), clarinet (6), tenor saxophone (7, 10), background vocals (4, 6, 7, 11)
- Marti Sweet – violin (3, 4, 11)
- Gerald Tarack – violin (11)
- Wincey Terry – background vocals (4, 12)
- Nathaniel Townsley – drums (2, 9)
- Raymond Vega – trumpet (6, 11)
- Bill Ware – vibraphone (10)
- Frederick Zlotkin – cello (3, 4)

Technical personnel

- Corey Glover – engineer and mixing (1)
- Jay Mark – engineer and mixing (2–12)
- Tim Conklin – assistant engineer (2–12)
- Jim Caruana – mixing assistant (2–12)
- Steve Decautis – engineer and mixing (2, 9)
- Herb Powers – mastering
- Antonio M. Reid – executive producer
- Kenneth B. Edmonds – executive producer
