= What's Your Favorite Color?: Remixes, B-Sides and Rarities =

Compilation album by Living Colour
- Released: April 5, 2005
- Genre: Funk metal

Living Colour chronology
Instant Live: Avalon, Boston, MA 10/17/04 (2005)	What's Your Favorite Color?: Remixes, B-Sides and Rarities (2005)	The Chair in the Doorway (2009)

What's Your Favorite Color? is a compilation album by hard rock band Living Colour. It was released in 2005.

== Track listing ==
No.	Title	Length
1.	"Ausländer (Overload Mix)"	7:24
2.	"Sunshine of Your Love (The Adrian Sherwood & Skip McDonald Remix) (Cream cover)"	5:48
3.	"Love Rears Its Ugly Head (Hip Hop Mix)"	5:09
4.	"What's Your Favorite Color? (Theme Song) (LeBlanc Remix)"	5:40
5.	"Love And Happiness (Al Green cover)"	5:08
6.	"Nothingness (Acoustic Version)"	3:26
7.	"Leave It Alone (Acoustic Version)"	2:59
8.	"Solace of You (Acoustic Version)"	3:39
9.	"Cult Of Personality (Live)"	4:54
10.	"Talkin' 'bout a Revolution (Live)" (Tracy Chapman cover)	6:00

== Personnel ==
- Corey Glover – vocals
- Vernon Reid – guitar
- Muzz Skillings – bass
- Doug Wimbish – bass
- Will Calhoun – drums
