= Leave It Alone (Living Colour song) =

1993 single by Living Colour

Single by Living Colour

from the album Stain
- Released: February 8, 1993
- Length: 3:29
- Label: Epic
- Songwriters: Corey Glover, Vernon Reid, Doug Wimbish
- Producers: Ron Saint Germain, Living Colour

Living Colour singles chronology
"Talkin' Loud and Sayin' Nothing" (1991)	"Leave It Alone" (1993)	"Ausländer" (1993)

Music video
- "Leave It Alone" on YouTube

"Leave It Alone" is a song by American rock band Living Colour from their third album, Stain. In 1994, the song was nominated for Best Hard Rock Performance at the 36th Annual Grammy Awards.

== Charts ==
Weekly chart performance for "Leave It Alone"
Chart (1993)	Peak position
Australia (ARIA)	59
Netherlands (Dutch Top 40)	28
Netherlands (Single Top 100)	41
New Zealand (Recorded Music NZ)	20
UK Singles (OCC)	34
US Alternative Airplay (Billboard)	4
US Mainstream Rock (Billboard)	14
