= Ausländer (Living Colour song) =

1993 single by Living Colour

Single by Living Colour

from the album Stain
- Released: April 5, 1993
- Length: 2:38
- Label: Epic
- Songwriters: Corey Glover; Vernon Reid; Doug Wimbish; Will Calhoun
- Producers: Ron Saint Germain; Living Colour

Living Colour singles chronology
"Leave It Alone" (1993)	"Ausländer" (1993)	"Nothingness" (1993)

Music video
- "Ausländer" on YouTube

"Ausländer" is a song by American rock band Living Colour, recorded for their third album, Stain (1993), and released as its second single in April 1993. The term means foreigner(s) in German.

== Charts ==
Chart (1993)	Peak position
UK Singles (OCC)	53
