= People Get Ready – A Tribute to Curtis Mayfield =

People Get Ready - A Tribute to Curtis Mayfield

Compilation album by Various artists
- Released: 1993
- Studio: Acme Studios, Mamaroneck, NY
- Label: Shanachie
- Producer: Joe Terry, Jon Tiven

Professional ratings
Review scores
| Source | Rating |
|---|---|
| AllMusic | 3/5 stars |

People Get Ready – A Tribute to Curtis Mayfield is a compilation album of various artists, celebrating the music of Curtis Mayfield.

== Track listing ==
1. "Um, Um, Um, Um, Um, Um" – Don Covay & Angela Strehli
2. "He Will Break Your Heart" – Delbert McClinton
3. "Choice of Colors" – Jerry Butler
4. "People Get Ready" – David Sanborn & Jonathan Sanborn
5. "Got a Right to Cry" – Angela Strehli
6. "It's All Right" – Huey Lewis and the News
7. "We People Who Are Darker Than Blue" – Michael Hill & Vernon Reid
8. "I Gotta Keep on Moving" – Bunny Wailer
9. "You Must Believe Me" – Don Covay
10. "I'm So Proud" – Steve Cropper & Lani Groves
11. "Gypsy Woman" – Kim Wilson

== Personnel ==
- Will Calhoun – drums
- Steve Cropper – guitar
- Paul Griffin – keyboards
- Jonathan Sanborn – bass
- The Uptown Horns: Crispin Cioe (as, bs), Arno Hecht (ts), Bob Funk (tb), Larry Etkin (tp)
