= King Heroin =

Single by James Brown

from the album There It Is
- B-side: "Theme From King Heroin"
- Released: March 1972
- Recorded: January 17 & 18, 1972, A&R Studios, New York, NY
- Genre: Soul
- Length: 3:56
- Label: Polydor; 14116
- Songwriter(s): James Brown; David Matthews; Manny Rosen; Charles Bobbit
- Producer(s): James Brown

James Brown charting singles chronology
"Talking Loud and Saying Nothing - Part I" (1972)	"King Heroin" (1972)	"There It Is Part 1" (1972)

Audio video
- "King Heroin" on YouTube

"King Heroin" is an anti-drug song by James Brown, David Matthews, Manny Rosen and Charles Bobbit. Brown recorded this poem set to music at a studio in New York with session musicians in January 1972 and released it as a single in March. It was his fifth single for Polydor Records and reached number six on the U.S. Hot Soul Singles chart and number 40 on the Billboard Hot 100 in the spring. The song was included on Brown's 1972 album There It Is.

== Background ==
The poem was originally written by Rosen, who worked at the Stage Delicatessen on Seventh Avenue in midtown Manhattan. It was written from the point of view of the drug, and explained in graphic detail by first-person narrative the effects heroin addiction has on people who use it, from fashion models neglecting their looks, to "the most virile of men losing their sex," to committing murder, to cold turkey withdrawal. Rosen's poem was then set to music by Brown, his arranger David Matthews, and Brown's manager Charles Bobbit. Brown added an intro to start off the piece, referring to heroin as "one of our most deadly killers in the country today"; and towards the end, he noted, "This is a revolution of the mind" – referring to the title of his 1971 live concert album recorded at the Apollo Theater in New York.

"King Heroin" was another of Brown's stabs of socially conscious music, along the lines of such previous efforts as "Don't Be a Drop-Out" and "Say It Loud – I'm Black and I'm Proud." His narrative style on this song is also considered to be a forerunner of rap music.

An advertisement for the single said "Play this record. To your station it means 3 minutes and 58 seconds. To some listener it may mean a lifetime."

== Personnel ==
- James Brown - lead vocal

with studio band:

- Danny Stiles - trumpet
- Marvin Stamm - trumpet
- Jimmy Buffington - French horn
- Joe Farrell - flute, tenor saxophone, English horn
- Seldon Powell - flute, tenor saxophone
- Richard Tee - organ
- Sam Brown - guitar
- Joe Beck - guitar
- Michael Moore - bass
- Billy Cobham - drums

== Chart positions ==
Chart (1972)	Peak position
U.S. Billboard Hot 100	40
U.S. Billboard R&B	6

== Other versions and uses ==
The song was included in the 1991 box set Star Time and the 1996 compilation CD Make It Funky – The Big Payback: 1971–1975.

The song was covered by James Chance and The Contortions in 1981, Van Hunt in 2006, and The Scallions (featuring The Impossebulls) in 2007.

Among the songs that sampled "King Heroin" were Truth Hurts' 2010 recording "Smoke," J Dilla's 2010 release "Heroin Joint," Quetzal's 2009 record "I Need the Street (Pernety Blues)," D'Nell's 2005 record "Different Day," Deichkind's 2000 release "Slangdaddy." and Home Brew's 2012 recording "Radio" and "Radio Outro."

American rapper Sauce Walka used the original instrumental for his song 'King Codeine' released in 2015 for his project 'Sorry 4 the Sauce 2'.

The German band Virus recorded an organ-heavy rock cover of the song on their album Thoughts (1971) and released an edited version of the song as a 7".^{(how is it a cover if it came out before [1971] the James Brown version [1972]?)}
