= Nothingness (song) =

Single by Living Colour

from the album Stain
- Released: 1993
- Recorded: 1993
- Genre: Symphonic rock, avant-garde metal
- Length: 3:30
- Label: Epic
- Songwriter: Will Calhoun
- Producers: Ron Saint Germain; Living Colour

Living Colour singles chronology
"Ausländer" (1993)	"Nothingness" (1993)	"Bi" (1993)

Music video
- "Nothingness" on YouTube

"Nothingness" is a song by Living Colour and the third single off their third studio album, Stain. The ballad reached #17 on the Billboard Modern Rock Tracks chart in 1993. It was later included on two greatest hits compilations, Pride (1995) and Everything Is Possible: The Very Best of Living Colour (2006). An acoustic version, allegedly intended for Dutch radio, was also included on 1994's Japan-exclusive Dread compilation.

The track opens with crickets chirping and a synthesizer-like guitar progression. A prominent bass rhythm carries the song and provides flashy funk-style fills. The lyrics explore themes of isolation and loneliness. The double-track effect of Corey Glover's vocals were accomplished by having Glover sing directly into an outdoor satellite dish (with the microphone placed in the feedhorn location of the dish), hence the satellite-themed artwork of the single. The song was written by the group's drummer Will Calhoun and is a tribute to his father's death.

== Music video ==
The "Nothingness" video relies on brief clips of musical performance and atmosphere with no obvious story concept. It hosts dark, ambient background visuals such as clouds flowing across a piercing sun. Shots are brief and frequently fade to black with the band members seen in heavily shadowed or silhouetted form. As depicted on the CD single cover, satellite dishes are also seen in various settings.

== Charts ==
Chart performance for "Nothingness"
Chart (1993)	Peak position
Australia (ARIA)	85
New Zealand (Recorded Music NZ)	28
US Modern Rock Tracks (Billboard)	17
