= There It Is (James Brown album) =

Studio album by James Brown
- Released: June 9, 1972
- Recorded: October 1, 1970 – April 4, 1972
- Studio: Bobby Smith Studios (Macon, Georgia); King Studios (Cincinnati, Ohio); Starday-King Sound Studios (Nashville, Tennessee); A&R Studios (New York City, New York)
- Genre: Funk; Soul
- Length: 43:21
- Label: Polydor; 2391 033
- Producer: James Brown

James Brown chronology
Hot Pants (1971)	There It Is (1972)	Get on the Good Foot (1972)

Singles from There It Is
- 1. "I'm a Greedy Man" Released: October 1971; 2. "Talkin' Loud and Sayin' Nothing" Released: January 1972; 3. "King Heroin" Released: February 1972; 4. "There It Is" Released: April 1972

There It Is is the 33rd studio album by American musician James Brown. His second release for Polydor Records, it contained five of his early-1970s hits. The album was released on June 9, 1972. It reached No. 10 on the Billboard Best Selling Soul LP's charts and No. 60 on the Top LP's & Tape.

Professional ratings
Review scores
Source	Rating
AllMusic	4.5/5 stars
The Rolling Stone Album Guide	4.5/5 stars
Tom Hull – on the Web	A−
The Village Voice	A−

== Track listing ==
Side A
No.	Title	Writer(s)	Length
1.	"There It Is Part 1"	James Brown, St. Clair Pinckney	3:05
2.	"There It Is Part 2"	James Brown, St. Clair Pinckney	2:47
3.	"King Heroin"	James Brown, David Matthews, Manny Rosen	3:56
4.	"I'm A Greedy Man Part 1"	James Brown	2:47
5.	"I'm A Greedy Man Part 2"	James Brown	4:29
6.	"Who Am I"	Johnny Terry	4:30

Side B
No.	Title	Writer(s)	Length
1.	"Talkin' Loud and Sayin' Nothing"	James Brown, Bobby Byrd	5:41
2.	"Public Enemy #1 Part 1"	James Brown, Henry Stallings, Charles Bobbit	5:05
3.	"Public Enemy #1 Part 2"	James Brown, Henry Stallings, Charles Bobbit	5:05
4.	"I Need Help (I Can't Do It Alone)"	Teddy Brown	2:56
5.	"Never Can Say Goodbye"	James Brown	3:00

1993 CD release
No.	Title	Writer(s)	Length
1.	"There It Is (Parts 1 & 2)"	James Brown, St. Clair Pinckney	5:50
2.	"King Heroin"	James Brown, David Matthews, Manny Rosen	3:58
3.	"I'm A Greedy Man"	James Brown, Charles Bobbit	7:06
4.	"Who Am I"	Johnny Terry	4:59
5.	"Talkin' Loud and Sayin' Nothing"	James Brown, Bobby Byrd	7:49
6.	"Public Enemy #1 (Part 1)"	James Brown, Charles Bobbit, Henry Stallings	5:06
7.	"Public Enemy #1 (Part 2)"	James Brown, Charles Bobbit, Henry Stallings	5:09
8.	"I Need Help (I Can't Do It Alone)"	Teddy Brown	3:31
9.	"Never Can Say Goodbye"	James Brown	3:02

== Personnel ==
- James Brown – lead vocal, record producer, arranger on tracks 1, 3, 5–8
- Bobby Byrd – organ, vocal
- Phelps "Catfish" Collins – guitar
- William "Bootsy" Collins – bass
- John "Jabo" Starks – drums
- Johnny Griggs
- Joe Beck – guitar
- Joe Farrell – sax
- Clayton "Chicken" Gunnels – trumpet
- Darryl "Hassan" Jamison – trumpet
- Robert McCollough – tenor saxophone
- St. Clair Pinckney – baritone saxophone
- Richard Tee – keyboard, organ
- Danny Stiles – trumpet
- Marvin Stamm – trumpet
- Jimmy Buffington – French horn
- Seldon Powell – flute, tenor saxophone
- Sam Brown – guitar
- Dave Matthews – arranger on tracks 2, 4
- Fred Wesley – arranger on track 9
- Joseph M. Palmaccio – digital remastering

== Charts ==
Chart (1972)	Peak position
US Billboard Top LPs & Tape	60
US Billboard Best Selling Soul LP's	10
