= Talkin' Loud and Sayin' Nothing =

"Talking Loud and Saying Nothing - Part I"

Single by James Brown

from the album There It Is
- B-side: "Talking Loud and Saying Nothing - Part II"
- Released: February 1972
- Recorded: October 1, 1970
- Studio: Bobby Smith Studios, Macon, Georgia
- Genre: Funk
- Length: 3:15 (Part I); 4:00 (Part II); 14:42 (complete version); 5:07 (original version)
- Label: Polydor; 14109
- Songwriters: James Brown; Bobby Byrd
- Producer: James Brown

James Brown charting singles chronology
"I'm a Greedy Man - Part I" (1971)	"Talking Loud and Saying Nothing - Part I" (1972)	"King Heroin" (1972)

Audio video
- "Talkin' Loud And Saying Nothin'" on YouTube

"Talkin' Loud and Sayin' Nothing" is a funk song written by James Brown and Bobby Byrd. Recorded in 1970 by Brown and the original J.B.'s with Byrd on backing vocals and updated with a new melody, it was twice released as a two-part single in 1972. It also appeared on the album There It Is.

== Background ==
Critic Robert Christgau called it "the loosest and most infectious of Brown's many socially conscious jams." It is in this song we learn that Brown originally envisioned rapping as call and response. The original version was more rock-oriented and featured on The Singles Vol Six, 1969-1970.

According to Brown, "Talkin' Loud and Sayin' Nothing" was "aimed at the politicians who were running their mouths but had no knowledge of what life was like for a lot of people in [the United States]" as well as "some of the cats on their soapboxes... who were telling the people one thing while manipulating their emotions for personal gain." Biographer RJ Smith described it as "an open criticism of self-styled arbiters of racial justice" who attacked Brown for his often-heterodox political stances.

In the middle of the song Brown orders all the band members to temporarily stop playing while he and Byrd maintain the rhythm using their voices alone - an early example of a dance music breakdown.

Record World praised the "unbelievable bass work."

== Personnel ==
- James Brown - lead vocal

with The J.B.'s:

- Clayton "Chicken" Gunnells - trumpet
- Darryl "Hassan" Jamison - trumpet
- Robert McCollough - tenor saxophone
- St. Clair Pinckney - baritone saxophone
- Bobby Byrd - organ, vocal
- Phelps "Catfish" Collins - guitar
- William "Bootsy" Collins - bass
- John "Jabo" Starks - drums
- Johnny Griggs - congas

== Chart positions ==
"Talkin' Loud and Saying Nothing"reached number one on the U.S. Hot Soul Singles chart and number twenty-seven on the Billboard Hot 100 during the spring of that year.

Chart (1972)	Peak position
U.S. Billboard Hot 100	27
U.S. Billboard R&B	1

== Withdrawn version ==
Brown recorded a blues-rock oriented version of the song on February 26, 1970 at the King studios in Cincinnati, Ohio. His backup band on this version consisted of his arranger David Matthews on organ, Kenny Poole on fuzz guitar, Michael Moore (who later played on Brown's 1972 hit "King Heroin") on bass, and Jimmy Madison on drums. This group would record one album under the name The Grodeck Whipperjenny for Brown's People label, and back Brown on his final King album in 1971, Sho' Is Funky Down Here. This version, split in two parts, was scheduled for release on King 45-P-6359, and several copies were pressed on both white and black labels, but the record was withdrawn from release before it could be distributed. (The J.B.'s-backed version was to have been concurrently released as 45-S-6359, but no copies of this variation are known to exist.) The full version (5:07) of this blues-rock rendition was issued in 2000 on the compilation CD James Brown's Funky People: Volume 3.

== Other versions ==
A remixed version of "Talkin' Loud and Sayin' Nothing" was included on the 1986 James Brown compilation album In the Jungle Groove.

A longer version of the song (9:28) is included in the Star Time box set.

The complete version of the song (14:42) was released in 1996 on the compilation CD Funk Power 1970: A Brand New Thang.

Living Colour recorded a cover version in 1991 for their Biscuits EP.

== See also ==
- List of number-one R&B singles of 1972 (U.S.)
