= I'm a Greedy Man =

"I'm a Greedy Man - Part I"

Single by James Brown

from the album There It Is
- B-side: "I'm a Greedy Man - Part II"
- Released: November 1971
- Recorded: May 13, 1971, Starday-King Studios, Nashville, TN
- Genre: Funk
- Length: 2:47 (Part I); 4:29 (Part II)
- Label: Polydor; 14100
- Songwriter(s): James Brown; Charles Bobbit
- Producer(s): James Brown

James Brown charting singles chronology
"My Part/Make It Funky - Part 3" (1971)	"I'm a Greedy Man - Part I" (1971)	"Talkin' Loud and Saying Nothin' Pt. 1" (1972)

Audio video
- "I'm A Greedy Man (Pt. 1)" on YouTube

"I'm a Greedy Man" is a song recorded by James Brown in 1971. It was released as a two-part single on Polydor Records, which charted #7 R&B and #35 Pop. The song also appeared on the album There It Is.
