= Biscuits (EP) =

EP by Living Colour
- Released: July 16, 1991
- Recorded: Various
- Genre: Heavy metal, funk metal
- Length: 30:21
- Label: Epic
- Producer: Ron St. Germain, Ed Stasium

Living Colour chronology
Time's Up (1990)	Biscuits (1991)	Stain (1993)

Professional ratings
Review scores
Source	Rating
AllMusic	3/5 stars
Robert Christgau	(choice cut)
Entertainment Weekly	B
Rolling Stone	3.5/5 stars
Sputnikmusic	3/5

Biscuits was an EP of live and unreleased cuts by Living Colour, released on July 16, 1991. The Sony Music Japan edition of this disc had nine extra tracks not available on the international editions, making Biscuits a compilation album. This is the final Living Colour release to feature bassist Muzz Skillings.

== Track listing (EP) ==
1. "Talkin' Loud and Sayin' Nothing" (James Brown, Bobby Byrd) – 4:02
  - Previously unreleased, recorded in New York City in May 1991.
2. "Desperate People" (Calhoun, Glover, Reid, Skillings) – 5:34
  - Recorded live at CBGB in New York City on December 18, 1989.
3. "Love and Happiness" (Green, Hodges) – 5:07
  - Previously unreleased, recorded in April 1990 during the sessions of the Time's Up album.
4. "Memories Can't Wait" (Byrne, Harrison) – 5:06
  - Recorded live at the Ritz in New York City on April 22, 1989.
5. "Burning of the Midnight Lamp" (Jimi Hendrix) – 5:30
  - Previously unreleased, recorded in New York City in May 1991.
6. "Money Talks" (Reid) – 5:02
  - Previously unreleased, recorded in April 1990 during the sessions of the Time's Up album.

== Track listing (Japan) ==
1. "Talkin' Loud and Sayin' Nothing" (Brown)
2. "Burning of the Midnight Lamp" (Hendrix)
  - 1–2 previously unreleased, recorded in New York City in May 1991.
3. "Money Talks" (Reid)
4. "Love and Happiness" (Green, Hodges)
5. "Should I Stay or Should I Go" (Jones, Mellor, Headon, Simonon)
  - 3–5 previously unreleased, recorded in April 1990 during the sessions of the Time's Up album.
6. "Love Rears Its Ugly Head" (Soulpower US Mix) (Reid)
7. "Desperate People" (Reid, Calhoun, Glover, Skillings)
  - Recorded live at CBGB in New York City on December 18, 1989.
8. "Final Solution" (Live) (Herman, Krauss, Thomas, Malmore, Ravenstine)
9. "Middle Man" (Live) (Reid/Glover)
  - 8–9 Recorded live at Cabaret Metro in Chicago on November 9, 1990.
10. "Memories Can't Wait" (Byrne, Harrison)
  - Recorded live at the Ritz in New York City on April 22, 1989.
11. "Information Overload" (Live) (Reid)
  - Recorded live at Cabaret Metro in Chicago on November 9, 1990.
12. "The Ocean" (Live) (Page, Plant, Jones, Bonham)
13. "Sailin' On" (Live) (Bad Brains)
  - 12–13 Recorded live at the Ritz in New York City on April 22, 1989.
14. "Type" (Live) (Reid)
  - Recorded live at Electric Ladyland Studios, December 15, 1990.
15. "Solace of You" (Live) (Glover, Reid)
  - Recorded live at Cabaret Metro in Chicago on November 9, 1990.

== Personnel ==
- Corey Glover – vocals
- Vernon Reid – guitar
- Muzz Skillings – bass
- Will Calhoun – drums

Additional personnel

- Lyvio G. – turntables on “Talkin’ Loud and Sayin’ Nothing”
- Chris Cushman – saxophone on “Talkin’ Loud and Sayin’ Nothing”

== Production ==
- Producers: Ron Saint Germain, Ed Stasium
- Engineer: Lolly Grodner, Paul Hamingson
- Mastering: Bob Ludwig
- Art direction: Mark Burdett, Stacy Drummond
- Photography: Gene Ambo, Hideo Oida, Charles Purvis, David Tan
- Recording technician: Dennis Thompson

== Charts ==
Chart (1991)	Peak position
Australian Albums (ARIA)	25
Dutch Albums (Album Top 100)	43
Finnish Albums (The Official Finnish Charts)	18
Swiss Albums (Schweizer Hitparade)	32
US Billboard 200	110
