= Collideøscope =

Collideoscope

Studio album by Living Colour
- Released: October 7, 2003
- Recorded: 2001-2002
- Genres: Heavy metal; funk metal; hard rock; alternative metal; funk rock
- Length: 60:20
- Label: Sanctuary
- Producers: Living Colour, Andy Stackpole

Living Colour chronology
Stain (1993)	Collideoscope (2003)	Live from CBGB's (2005)

Singles from Collideøscope
- 1. "Song Without Sin" Released: 2003

Collideøscope is the fourth studio album by American rock band Living Colour. Released on October 7, 2003, it was their first studio album in ten years. Living Colour began recording Collideøscope in 2001; many of the songs are about the September 11 attacks.

The album contains cover versions of AC/DC's "Back in Black" and The Beatles' "Tomorrow Never Knows". While critically praised, Collideøscope is the band's first album that failed to chart.

A version of "Sacred Ground" previously appeared on their 1995 compilation album Pride.

== Critical reception ==
Professional ratings
Review scores
Source	Rating
AllMusic	4/5 stars
Robert Christgau	(1-star Honorable Mention)
The Encyclopedia of Popular Music	3/5 stars
Rolling Stone	4/5 stars
Spin	C
Sputnikmusic	3/5

Exclaim! wrote that "as always, variety is the order of the day with these talented musicians, with the band jumping from traditional hard rock, to groovy near-funk (bleh) to a reggae-tinged number, experimental soundscapes, etc." The Chicago Tribune wrote: "As if time stood still, the album packs wallop with its aggressive sonic bursts and acute perspective on a post-9/11 society in flux."

== Track listing ==
No.	Title	Length
1.	"Song Without Sin"	4:07
2.	"A ? of When"	3:48
3.	"Operation: Mind Control"	3:09
4.	"Flying"	4:23
5.	"In Your Name"	4:22
6.	"Back in Black"	4:24
7.	"Nightmare City"	4:05
8.	"Lost Halo"	4:19
9.	"Holy Roller"	4:25
10.	"Great Expectation"	3:37
11.	"Choices Mash Up"	5:06
12.	"Pocket of Tears"	4:41
13.	"Sacred Ground"	4:10
14.	"Tomorrow Never Knows"	4:10
15.	"Nova"	1:35

== Personnel ==
Living Colour

- Corey Glover – vocals
- Vernon Reid – guitars, acoustic guitar, backing vocals, sound design, sample munging
- Doug Wimbish – bass, backing vocals, sound design, ambience, guitars (track 3), drums (10), drum programming (5)
- Will Calhoun – drums, wave drum, indigenous water drum, samples, loops, tabla, keyboard sonics, electronic percussion

Additional personnel

- David Sancious – keyboards (9)
