= There It Is (James Brown song) =

"There It Is Part 1"

Single by James Brown

from the album There It Is
- B-side: "There It Is Part 2"
- Released: May 1972
- Recorded: February 7, 1972, Bobby Smith Studios, Macon, GA
- Genre: Funk
- Length: 3:05 (Part 1); 2:47 (Part 2)
- Label: Polydor; 14125
- Songwriter(s): James Brown
- Producer(s): James Brown

James Brown charting singles chronology
"King Heroin" (1971)	"There It Is Part 1" (1972)	"Honky Tonk - Part 1" (1971)

Audio video
- "There It Is" on YouTube

"There It Is" is a funk song by James Brown. It was arranged by Dave Matthews. Released as a two-part single in 1972, it charted #4 R&B and #43 Pop. Both parts of the song also appeared on an album of the same name.

A live performance of "There It Is" is included on the 1988 compilation album Motherlode.
