= Solace of You =

Single by Living Colour

from the album Time's Up
- Released: 1990
- Length: 3:38
- Label: Epic
- Songwriters: Corey Glover; Vernon Reid
- Producer: Ed Stasium

Living Colour singles chronology
"Love Rears Its Ugly Head" (1990)	"Solace of You" (1990)	"Elvis Is Dead" (1990)

Music video
- "Solace of You" on YouTube

"Solace of You" is a song by the American rock band Living Colour. It was released as the third single from their second studio album, Time's Up (1990).

== Charts ==
Chart performance for "Solace of You"
Chart (1991)	Peak position
Australia (ARIA)	69
Netherlands (Single Top 100)	27
UK Singles (OCC)	33
UK Airplay (Music Week)	11
