= Type (song) =

Single by Living Colour

from the album Time's Up
- Released: 1990
- Recorded: 1989–1990
- Genre: Hard rock
- Length: 4:45 (U.S. radio edit); 3:49 (U.K. DJ edit); 6:26 (album)
- Label: Epic
- Songwriter: Vernon Reid
- Producer: Ed Stasium

Living Colour singles chronology
"Funny Vibe (remix)" (1989)	"Type" (1990)	"Love Rears Its Ugly Head" (1990)

Music video
- "Type" on YouTube

"Type" is the first single from Living Colour's second album Time's Up released in 1990.

== Music video ==
Type's music video is set in a run down junkyard styled setting outside of New York City where the band is playing. Throughout the video, images reflect technology, corporate greed, fundamentalist Christianity via televangelism, politics, and poverty have become the norm. It also reflects how regular people are trying so hard to get what they can't have, but the rich can easily obtain.

== Charts ==
Chart	Peak position
Australia (ARIA Charts)	121
U.S. Mainstream Rock	5
U.S. Modern Rock	3
