= Vivid (Living Colour album) =

Studio album by Living Colour
- Released: May 2, 1988
- Recorded: 1987–1988
- Studios: Skyline (New York City); Sound on Sound (New York City); Right Track (New York City)
- Genres: Hard rock; heavy metal; funk metal; alternative metal; funk rock
- Length: 49:09
- Label: Epic
- Producers: Ed Stasium; Mick Jagger

Living Colour chronology
Vivid (1988)	Time's Up (1990)

Singles from Vivid
- 1. "Middle Man" Released: 1988; 2. "Cult of Personality" Released: July 14, 1988; 3. "Glamour Boys" Released: 1989; 4. "Open Letter (To a Landlord)" Released: 1989; 5. "Funny Vibe" Released: 1989

Vivid is the debut studio album by American rock band Living Colour, released on May 2, 1988, by Epic Records. It was one of the most popular albums of 1988, peaking at number six on the US Billboard 200 chart and being certified double platinum by the Recording Industry Association of America (RIAA).

== Musical style ==
Musically, Vivid has been described as a hard rock, heavy metal, funk metal, alternative metal, and funk rock album, with elements of soul, jazz, pop, rap, arena rock, punk, and avant-garde jazz.

== Critical reception ==
Professional ratings
Review scores
Source	Rating
AllMusic	4.5/5 stars
Blender	4/5 stars
Chicago Sun-Times	4/4 stars
Kerrang!	4 1/2/5
NME	8/10
The Philadelphia Inquirer	4/4 stars
Pitchfork	9.0/10
Rolling Stone	3/5 stars
The Rolling Stone Album Guide	4/5 stars
The Village Voice	B

In The Philadelphia Inquirer, Ken Tucker commented that Living Colour "defies musical stereotypes by evincing influences that include Lynyrd Skynyrd, Jimi Hendrix, Roxy Music and Sly Stone to yield a fierce, funny album." Mark Sinker of NME likewise highlighted the band's diversity of influences, including their embrace of older musical styles "that even metal heads haven't taken seriously" and concluded that Vivid "lives up, simultaneously, to the pinhead directness of Zeppelin and the total Texas-New Yorker strangeness of Ornette Coleman's Prime Time." "In its own way," wrote Rolling Stone critic David Fricke, "Vivid is an open letter to rock & roll itself, a demand for equal time and respect from a music that is Living Colour's birthright." He added that the album "will not change the world single-handedly, but it's a timely reminder of why it's always worth trying." Robert Christgau was less enthusiastic in The Village Voice, finding that "while it's momentarily exhilarating to hear this all-black band come power-chording out of the box, after a while the fancy arrangements and strained soul remind me of, I don't know, Megadeth." The album came in at #15 on the 1988 top-25 'albums of the year list' in Kerrang!

Among retrospective appraisals, AllMusic reviewer Greg Prato deemed Vivid "one of the finest hard rock albums of the '80s – and for that matter, all time." In Blender, Michael Azerrad recalled that the notion of "four black musicians playing heavy metal" made Vivid "newsworthy" while adding that as "the black-rock trend never panned out," years after the album's release Living Colour's chief legacy lies in its music, noting Vivid's "landmark" fusion of "hardcore, funk and avant-jazz." J. D. Considine, writing for the 2004 edition of The Rolling Stone Album Guide, was most impressed by how Living Colour "backs its musical vision with insight, offering pointed, perceptive social commentary through songs such as 'Funny Vibe' and 'Open Letter (To a Landlord).'" Calling Vivid "a crucial document in Black rock music," Pitchfork's Stuart Berman opined that the album's legacy endures through later artists who have "flowed through the cracks in the industry barriers that Vivid breached, and, in their own unique ways, have each inherited the mission of reclaiming Black creators' frontline position at rock's vanguard, both under- and above-ground." Vivid is featured in the book 1001 Albums You Must Hear Before You Die.

== Awards and accolades ==
Grammy Awards

Year	Winner	Category
1990	"Cult of Personality"	Best Hard Rock Performance

Accolades for Vivid
Publication	Country	Accolade	Year	Rank
Rolling Stone	US	100 Best Albums of the Eighties	1989	64
LA Weekly	US	Chuck Klosterman's Favorite Hair Metal Albums	2011	23
Loudwire	US	The 50 Best Metal + Hard Rock Debut Albums Ranked	2015	33
Loudwire	US	Top 80 Hard Rock + Metal Albums of the 1980s	2016	37
Rolling Stone	US	The 100 Greatest Metal Albums of All Time	2017	71
KEXP	US	Top Albums of the Last 50 Years (1972–2022)	2022	637

== Track listing ==
No.	Title	Writer(s)	Length
1.	"Cult of Personality"	Vernon Reid, Muzz Skillings, Corey Glover, Will Calhoun	4:54
2.	"I Want to Know"	Reid	4:24
3.	"Middle Man"	Glover, Reid	3:47
4.	"Desperate People"	Calhoun, Reid, Glover, Skillings	5:36
5.	"Open Letter (To a Landlord)"	Reid, Tracie Morris	5:32
6.	"Funny Vibe"	Reid	4:20
7.	"Memories Can't Wait" (Talking Heads cover)	David Byrne, Jerry Harrison	4:30
8.	"Broken Hearts"	Reid	4:50
9.	"Glamour Boys"	Reid	3:39
10.	"What's Your Favorite Color? (Theme Song)"	Reid, Glover	3:56
11.	"Which Way to America?"	Reid	3:41
Total length:			49:09

- Track 10 runs 3:56 on original CD issues, and 1:41 on original vinyl and remastered CD issues.

2002 CD reissue bonus tracks
No.	Title	Writer(s)	Length
12.	"Funny Vibe" (Funky Vibe Mix)		3:43
13.	"Should I Stay or Should I Go" (The Clash cover)	Mick Jones	2:27
14.	"What's Your Favorite Color? (Theme Song)" (Leblanc Remix)		5:39
15.	"Middle Man" (Recorded live at Cabaret Metro, Chicago; November 9, 1990)		3:49
16.	"Cult of Personality" (Recorded live at the Ritz, New York City; 1988)		4:59

== Personnel ==
Living Colour

- Corey Glover – vocals
- Vernon Reid – guitars
- Muzz Skillings – bass
- Will Calhoun – drums

Additional personnel

- Mick Jagger – harmonica on track 8, backing vocals on track 9
- Chuck D – rapping on track 6
- Flavor Flav – social commentary on track 6
- The Fowler Family – additional backing vocals on tracks 2 and 5
- Dennis Diamond – carnival barker on track 8

Production

- Ed Stasium – producer and engineer on tracks 1–8 and 10, mixing on tracks 9 and 11
- Mick Jagger – producer on tracks 9 and 11
- Ron St. Germain – engineer on tracks 9 and 11
- Paul Hamingson – engineer on tracks 1–8 and 10, mixing
- Danny Mormando, Debi Cornish, Stephen Immerwahr, Mike McMackin, Tom Durack, U.E. Natasi – assistant engineers
- Greg Calbi – mastering

== Charts ==
=== Weekly charts ===
Chart (1988–1989)	Peak position
Australian Albums (ARIA)	52
Canada Top Albums/CDs (RPM)	11
Dutch Albums (Album Top 100)	92
New Zealand Albums (RMNZ)	2
Norwegian Albums (VG-lista)	15
US Billboard 200	6

=== Year-end charts ===
Chart (1989)	Position
New Zealand Albums (RMNZ)	26
US Billboard 200	13

== Certifications ==
Region	Certification	Certified units/sales
Canada (Music Canada)	Platinum	100,000^{^}
New Zealand (RMNZ)	Gold	7,500^{^}
United States (RIAA)	2× Platinum	2,000,000^{^}
^{^} Shipments figures based on certification alone.
