= Time's Up (Living Colour album) =

Studio album by Living Colour
- Released: August 28, 1990
- Studios: A&M (Hollywood); RPM (Los Angeles)
- Genres: Hard rock; heavy metal; funk metal; art rock
- Length: 57:35
- Label: Epic
- Producer: Ed Stasium

Living Colour chronology
Vivid (1988)	Time's Up (1990)	Biscuits (1991)

Time's Up is the second studio album by American rock band Living Colour, released on August 28, 1990, through Epic Records. It was the follow-up to their successful 1988 album Vivid. Time's Up features a wide range of genres and also includes cameo appearances by Queen Latifah, Little Richard, Doug E. Fresh, Maceo Parker and James Earl Jones. The album reached gold status, peaking at #13 on the Billboard 200, and won a Grammy for Best Hard Rock Performance. It is the final album to feature Muzz Skillings on bass, though it was not his last release with the band (as he appeared on the Biscuits EP). In late February 2014, the album was reissued in Europe by Music On CD and is available once again.

== Background ==
In 2015, Corey Glover explained, "Time's Up was an interesting one, because we spent part of the time making Time's Up in California - we were in LA. We did some of the basic tracks in LA. And that was really weird, because we're New York guys. Hanging out in California and being very 'California' was very strange to us. We were staying in the Valley, and it felt like we were in school, because we had to get up in the morning and I met Will at what felt like the bus stop. It was like, 'OK, we've got to go to work.' And jogging around in California and hanging around in California - and hanging out with the Fishbone guys while we were out there. Just hanging out and trying to dig this California thing, it was very, very interesting. I think it does hold up. With a few exceptions, it might falter, but 'Time's Up' and 'Pride' and the stuff we still play today, I think it still holds up and still works. The song 'Time's Up' is about the environment, and we're still talking about the environment - and the record is 20 years old!"

== Music ==
Time's Up has been described as a hard rock, heavy metal, funk metal and art rock album, with elements of hip hop, jazz, funk, jazz fusion, Delta blues, soul, and punk rock. According to Dele Fadele, Reid's guitar work throughout explores "crunchy riffs, white noise and atonality." Musical allusions to Public Enemy and Paul Simon appear on the record. Early subjects on the album concern personal and social problems, including drug dealing ("New Jack Theme"), environmental catastrophe ("Time's Up") and racism ("Pride"), whereas "Elvis Is Dead" calls into doubt Elvis Presley's reputation as 'the king of rock'.

The album opens with "Time's Up", a hardcore song, before moving to the Afrocentric-tinged "History Lesson", which uses cut-up samples to demonstrate African music being "for communication purposes". "Type" has been described as an unusual choice of lead single, due to its sophisticated, six-and-a-half minute length. "Pride" is reminiscent of Led Zeppelin. A jazz-rock song, "Elvis Is Dead" features a guest rap from Little Richard and a saxophone solo from Maceo Parker. One writer notes that it "throws more gasoline on the fire Public Enemy sent in Elvis Presley's direction the previous summer with 'Fight the Power'." "Type" and "Information Overload" feature complicated rhythms, while "Love Rears Its Ugly Head" is a funky, romantic song featuring a wah-wah guitar solo. "Under Cover of Darkness", featuring rapper Queen Latifah, was written on the subject of unprotected sex and features a pure jazz guitar solo from Reid. According to reviewer Alan Light, its "skittery, constricted arrangement highlights the band's previously buried jazz inflections." "Solace of You", a West African-style highlife love song featuring a reggae beat, is a diversion from the album's heavier topics, and musically reveals the group's African roots. Light highlights its "percolating township-jive groove built on Reid's shimmering guitar."

== Critical reception ==
Professional ratings
Review scores
Source	Rating
AllMusic	3.5/5 stars
Chicago Sun-Times	3.5/4 stars
Chicago Tribune	4/4 stars
Entertainment Weekly	A
Los Angeles Times	3.5/5 stars
NME	7/10
Rolling Stone	4/5 stars
The Rolling Stone Album Guide	4/5 stars
Select	4/5
The Village Voice	A−

In The Village Voice, Christgau named it the best art rock album since "Pink Floyd was in mourning", proving that the genre can "signify". He added: "Though the striking choruses and fancy structures are pretty Euro, the proximate model is Bad Brains sans Jah. And though MTV's millions have heard Reid's more panhuman messages before, they've rarely heard them expressed so coherently--or by a black person." Entertainment Weekly's Greg Sandow praised Reid's corrosive guitar work, saying he "often leapfrogs into rhythmic hyperspace, sliding around the outline of a beat that for moments on end no one explicitly plays. Such complicated musical thinking is common in jazz but almost unknown in rock. Living Colour widens rock’s scope, introducing, in an album aimed at a wide audience, a tough- minded kind of music-making normally found only in far more intellectual art."

Dele Fadele of NME noted that Living Colour remained passionate about social issues and were able to "subvert the mainstream" so adeptly that the music sometimes resembles "FM rock", but added that they differ from groups like Bon Jovi and Heart through their direct, earnest lyrics and the soulful elements, with funk and house moves and hip hop beats being threaded into the music. Mark Putterford of Select deemed it more leftfield than Time's Up, refusing to repeat its "funk-rock formula" and instead "[twisting] with violent abandon through 180 degrees of musical subculture" with tough, early Van Halen-style rhythms and pointed lyrics. "Angrier, deeper, louder, more alive than Vivid," wrote Alan Light of Rolling Stone", "Time's Up is an uncompromising declaration of subversive intent by a band that means to hang in for the long haul – and to make a difference."

In Spin Alternative Record Guide (1995), Chris Norris named it Living Colour's best album, partly for focusing more on music, thus "allowing the players in the quartet to step out a little". He highlighted the album's "small sonic treasures", such as the "vaporous guitar tones" at the end of "Pride", the harmolodic, "deconstructing" guitar solo from "Under Cover of Darkness", and Reid's "Adrian Belew-ish droning" in "In Another Life". In The Rough Guide to Rock (1999), Chris Wright deemed it a partial advance on Vivid, but also "self-indulgent and inspiring by turns", writing that the album's sheer eclecticism "made it an interesting rather than a listenable experience". Also reviewing the album retrospectively, AllMusic's Greg Prato opined that it was less successful than Vivid because of its more challenging content, both musically and lyrically, but found it just as strong as its predecessor, commenting that "Time's Up remains a convincing listen all these years later."

=== Accolades ===
In The Village Voice's annual Pazz & Jop critics' poll for the year's best albums, Time's Up finished at number five. The album came in at number 18 on the 1990 top-25 'albums of the year list' in Kerrang!. The album is listed in the book 501 Essential Albums of the 90s (2024); contributor Matthew Wilkening hailed it as "an impressively diverse and often complex album that expanded [the band's] claims further into punk, funk, jazz, soul, and hip-hop."

Grammy Awards

Year	Winner	Category
1990	Time's Up	Best Hard Rock Performance

== Track listing ==
All tracks are written by Vernon Reid, except where noted.

No.	Title	Writer(s)	Length
1.	"Time's Up"	Reid, Muzz Skillings, Corey Glover, Will Calhoun	3:05
2.	"History Lesson"		0:52
3.	"Pride"	Calhoun	4:55
4.	"Love Rears Its Ugly Head"		4:19
5.	"New Jack Theme"		3:30
6.	"Someone Like You"	Skillings	3:47
7.	"Elvis Is Dead" (feat. Little Richard)		3:50
8.	"Type"		6:26
9.	"Information Overload"		6:11
10.	"Under Cover of Darkness" (feat. Queen Latifah)	Glover	4:17
11.	"Ology"	Skillings	1:07
12.	"Fight the Fight"	Calhoun, Glover, Reid, Skillings	4:32
13.	"Tag Team Partners" (feat. Doug E. Fresh)	Glover	0:48
14.	"Solace of You"	Glover, Reid	3:38
15.	"This Is the Life"		6:23

Bonus tracks
No.	Title	Writer(s)	Length
16.	"Final Solution" (Live in Chicago 1990)	Craig Bell, Tom Herman, Scott Krauss, Peter Laughner, Dave Taylor, David Thomas, Tim Wright	5:44
17.	"Middle Man" (Live in Chicago 1990)	Glover, Reid	3:40
18.	"Love Rears Its Ugly Head" (aka Soul Power Mix)		4:05

=== Banded Version ===
A special US advance promo version omitting "History Lesson", "Ology” and "Tag Team Partners". Along with the CD, it was also pressed on transparent gold vinyl. Catalog number ESK 2171

No.	Title	Length
1.	"Time's Up"
2.	"Pride"
3.	"Love Rears Its Ugly Head"
4.	"New Jack Theme"
5.	"Someone Like You"
6.	"Elvis Is Dead"
7.	"Type"
8.	"Information Overload"
9.	"Under Cover of Darkness"
10.	"Fight the Fight"
11.	"Solace of You"
12.	"This Is the Life"

== Personnel ==
Living Colour

- Corey Glover – vocals, rhythm guitar on "Type"
- Vernon Reid – lead guitar
- Muzz Skillings – bass
- Will Calhoun – drums

Guest musicians

- Akbar Ali – strings on “Under Cover of Darkness”
- Charles Burnham – strings on “Under Cover of Darkness”
- Don Byron – clarinet and baritone saxophone on “Under Cover of Darkness”
- Annette Daniels – background vocals on “Pride” and “This is the Life”
- D.K. Dyson – background vocals on “Pride” and “This is the Life”
- Eileen Folson – strings on “Under Cover of Darkness”
- Doug E. Fresh – vocals on “Tag Team Partners”, mouth percussion on “Solace of You”
- Mick Jagger – background vocals on “Elvis is Dead”
- James Earl Jones - vocals on “History Lesson”
- Toshinobu Kubota – background vocals on “Elvis is Dead”
- Little Richard – vocals on “Elvis is Dead”
- Yubie Navas – background vocals on “Elvis is Dead”
- Maceo Parker – saxophone on “Elvis is Dead”
- Queen Latifah – vocals on “Under Cover of Darkness”
- Alva Rogers – background vocals on “Elvis is Dead”
- Rosa Russ – background vocals on “Pride” and “This is the Life”
- Francine Stasium – background vocals on “Elvis is Dead”
- Reggie Workman – strings on “Under Cover of Darkness”
- Derin Young – background vocals on “Pride”, “Solace of You” and “This is the Life”

Technical personnel

- John Aguto – assistant engineer
- Greg Calbi – mastering
- Alan Friedman – programming on “New Jack Theme”
- Lolly Grodner – assistant engineer
- Paul Hamingson – engineer, assistant engineer
- Jeff Lippay – assistant engineer
- Ed Stasium – producer, engineer, mixing
- Lex Van Pieterson – photography

== Charts ==
Chart (1990–1991)	Peak position
Australian Albums (ARIA)	15
Canada Top Albums/CDs (RPM)	30
Dutch Albums (Album Top 100)	24
Finnish Albums (The Official Finnish Charts)	10
German Albums (Offizielle Top 100)	56
New Zealand Albums (RMNZ)	10
Norwegian Albums (VG-lista)	13
Swiss Albums (Schweizer Hitparade)	11
UK Albums (Official Charts)	20
US Billboard 200	13

== Certifications ==
Region	Certification	Certified units/sales
Australia (ARIA)	Gold	35,000^{^}
Canada (Music Canada)	Gold	50,000^{^}
United States (RIAA)	Gold	500,000^{^}
^{^} Shipments figures based on certification alone.
