= Glamour Boys (song) =

1988 single by Living Colour

Single by Living Colour

from the album Vivid
- Released: 1988
- Genre: Reggae; pop; hard rock
- Length: 3:40
- Label: Epic
- Songwriter: Vernon Reid
- Producer: Mick Jagger

Living Colour singles chronology
"Cult of Personality" (1988)	"Glamour Boys" (1988)	"Open Letter (To a Landlord)" (1988)

Music video
- "Glamour Boys" on YouTube

"Glamour Boys" is the third single released by American rock band Living Colour from their 1988 debut album Vivid. It was nominated for a Grammy for Best Rock Performance by a Duo or Group with Vocal in 1990. The song reached #31 on the Billboard Hot 100.

Lyrically, "Glamour Boys" discusses young men obsessed with superficial aspects of high society such as clothing and parties. The chorus shouts "I ain't no glamour boy - I'm fierce!"

== Track listing ==
12" single

UK 1

1. "Glamour Boys" - 3:40
2. "Which Way To America?" - 3:40
3. "The Rap Track" - 7:41
4. "Middleman" - 3:46

UK 2

1. "Glamour Boys" - 3:40
2. "Cult Of Personality" (Live) - 4:54
3. "Memories Can't Wait" - 4:31

7" single

UK 1

1. "Glamour Boys" - 3:40
2. "Which Way To America?" - 3:40

UK 2

1. "Glamour Boys" (Remix) - 3:40
2. "Cult Of Personality" (Live) - 4:54

CD single

Single

1. "Glamour Boys" - 3:40
2. "Which Way To America?" - 3:40
3. "The Rap Track" (conversation with Living Colour) - 7:41
4. "Middleman" - 3:46

Maxi-Single

1. "Glamour Boys" (Remix) - 3:40
2. "Middleman" (Live) - 3:52
3. "Cult Of Personality" (Live) - 4:54
4. "Open Letter (To a Landlord)" - 5:33

== Charts ==
Chart	Peak
New Zealand RIANZ Singles Chart	14
U.S. Billboard Mainstream Rock	26
U.S. Billboard Hot 100	31
Dutch Top 40	31
UK Singles	83
