= Love Rears Its Ugly Head =

Single by Living Colour

from the album Time's Up
- Released: 1991
- Recorded: 1989–1990
- Genre: Funk rock; blues rock; R&B
- Length: 4:19
- Label: Epic
- Songwriter: Vernon Reid
- Producer: Ed Stasium

Living Colour singles chronology
"Type" (1990)	"Love Rears Its Ugly Head" (1991)	"Solace of You" (1990)

Music video
- "Love Rears Its Ugly Head" on YouTube

"Love Rears Its Ugly Head" is a single released by Living Colour in 1990 from their second album Time's Up.

It is in the style of most of the group's previous singles, a rock song with touches of R&B, especially in the vocals. It is most noted for its funk-style guitar parts that permeate throughout the entire song. It takes a sample from the song Lush Life by Nat King Cole. The music video features Cynthia Bailey of The Real Housewives of Atlanta fame.

The track peaked at number 8 on the Modern Rock Tracks chart in the United States and, in a heavily remixed form with re-recorded vocals and less of a rock influence, became the band's biggest hit single in the UK, peaking at number 12 on the UK Singles Chart.

== Charts ==
Chart (1991)	Peak position
Australia (ARIA)	10
Netherlands (Dutch Top 40)	16
UK Singles (OCC)	12
UK Airplay (Music Week)	7
US Album Rock Tracks (Billboard)	28
US Modern Rock Tracks (Billboard)	8
