= Stain (album) =

Studio album by Living Colour
- Released: March 2, 1993
- Recorded: May–September 1992
- Studios: Bearsville (Woodstock, New York); Long View Farm (North Brookfield, Massachusetts)
- Genres: Heavy metal; funk metal; hard rock; alternative metal; funk rock
- Length: 44:56
- Label: Epic
- Producers: Ron Saint Germain, Living Colour

Living Colour chronology
Biscuits (1991)	Stain (1993)	Pride (1995)

Singles from Album
- 1. "Leave It Alone" Released: February 8, 1993; 2. "Ausländer" Released: April 5, 1993; 3. "Nothingness" Released: 1993; 4. "Bi" Released: 1993

Stain is the third studio album by American rock band Living Colour. It was released on March 2, 1993, by Epic Records. It is the first album to feature bassist Doug Wimbish. Stain features a generally heavier sound with more pessimistic themes, the songs representing a range of genres. It peaked at #26 on the Billboard 200.

The song "Leave It Alone" was nominated for Best Hard Rock Performance at the 36th Annual Grammy Awards in 1994, but lost to "Plush" by Stone Temple Pilots.

From the mid-1990s through the early 2010s, the album was out of print due to rights issues after a lawsuit from Jon Stainbrook of the band The Stain forced Sony to cease production of the album. In November 2013, the album was reissued by Music On CD and is also available as an MP3 download. In June 2018, the album was reissued on limited edition green vinyl.

The album has retrospectively been considered a "dark horse" in the alternative rock, hard rock, and heavy metal genres.

== Background ==
In 2015, Corey Glover explained, "Stain was a darker turn for us. Muzz was out of the band at that point, and Doug had taken over, and we kind of got really dark. I think about songs like 'Postman,' and just how menacing and dark that song is. It had some very interesting things about it, and I think it was a turn. And part of that I think was about how far we had gotten to that point...I don't know if 'jaded' is the word, but we were sort of worn out by the world that we lived in. And just reflecting how worn out we were getting. I think it holds up. If you want to hear some really good hard rock - closer to the metal parts of our existence - I think Stain is the record that has the most of that."

The sample "Fifty-six times in eighty-one seconds. Something like this," at the start of "This Little Pig" is taken from Bill Bradley discussing the blows of the four officers beating Rodney King.

== Album cover ==
The cover art features a woman, the model Mouri Mbonika, wearing a scold's bridle.

== Critical reception ==
Professional ratings
Review scores
Source	Rating
AllMusic	2.5/5 stars
Robert Christgau	A−
Entertainment Weekly	C−
Rolling Stone	3/5 stars
Spin Alternative Record Guide	6/10
Sputnikmusic	3.5/5

At the time of the album's release, reviews were mixed, including David Browne in Entertainment Weekly giving it a C− rating, and saying "What happened to the lively, spunky, and essentially good-humored band of Living Colour's debut, Vivid? Stain doesn't flow; it clots." That year, the album did not even make the top-25 'albums of the year list' in Kerrang!, whereas both Vivid and Time's Up had in previous years. But there were also positive reviews, including renowned music critic Robert Christgau giving it an A− rating in Consumer Guide Album, and saying "The best thing about this excellent record is how hard it crunches." And in an interview with Vernon Reid in Rolling Stone that year, journalist David Breskin praised Stain as "by far their best record."

== Legacy ==
Stain was included in the 2014 book Overlooked/Underappreciated: 354 Recordings That Demand Your Attention. In 2018, Loudwire said "But twenty-five years later, the album seems more relevant than it ever was in its day." In 2023, Stain came in at #423 of a "Best 1,000 Albums Ever" list on the PopThruster site. In a retrospective album review, AllMusic said that "The tracks were more focused and streamlined when compared to the all-encompassing compositions on 1990's Time's Up, but were just as hard-hitting and thought provoking."

== Possible album re-recording ==
In 2022, the Metal Injection site reported the band may be re-recording the album, after a post on Instagram that showed Vernon Reid recording guitar parts for a new rendition of the song "Nothingness".

== Track listing ==
No.	Title	Writer(s)	Length
1.	"Go Away"	Calhoun, Glover, Reid, Wimbish	4:03
2.	"Ignorance Is Bliss"	Calhoun, Glover, Reid, Wimbish	3:17
3.	"Leave It Alone"	Glover, Reid, Wimbish	3:29
4.	"Bi"	Calhoun, Reid	4:46
5.	"Mind Your Own Business"	Reid	3:17
6.	"Ausländer"	Calhoun, Glover, Reid, Wimbish	2:38
7.	"Never Satisfied"	Glover, Reid	4:06
8.	"Nothingness"	Calhoun	3:30
9.	"Postman"	Reid	3:31
10.	"WTFF" (stands for What-The-Fuck Factor)	Betts, Calhoun, Glover, Reid, Wimbish	2:15
11.	"This Little Pig"	Calhoun, Glover, Reid, Wimbish	3:04
12.	"Hemp"	Reid, Fairley	1:36
13.	"Wall"	Calhoun, Glover, Reid, Wimbish	5:23

European CD Bonus tracks
No.	Title	Length
14.	"T.V. News"	4:20
15.	"Love Rears Its Ugly Head" (Live)	4:18

== Personnel ==
Living Colour

- Corey Glover – vocals
- Vernon Reid – guitars, guitar synthesizer
- Doug Wimbish – bass, ambiance
- Will Calhoun – drums

Guest musicians

- Andrew Fairley – vocals on "Hemp"
- Bernard Fowler – backing vocals

Technical Personnel

- Ron Saint Germain – production, recording, mixing
- Andre Betts – additional production
- Bob Ludwig – mastering
- Carol Chen – art direction
- Amy Guip – photography
- Mouri Mbonika – cover model

== Charts ==
=== Weekly charts ===
Chart (1993)	Peak position
Australian Albums (ARIA)	18
Austrian Albums (Ö3 Austria)	25
Canada Top Albums/CDs (RPM)	25
Dutch Albums (Album Top 100)	8
Finnish Albums (The Official Finnish Charts)	7
German Albums (Offizielle Top 100)	29
New Zealand Albums (RMNZ)	10
Swedish Albums (Sverigetopplistan)	42
Swiss Albums (Schweizer Hitparade)	14
UK Albums (Official Charts)	19
US Billboard 200	26

=== Year-end charts ===
Chart (1993)	Position
Dutch Albums (Album Top 100)	93
