= Cult of Personality (song) =

1988 single by Living Colour

Single by Living Colour

from the album Vivid
- Written: 1987
- Released: July 14, 1988
- Genre: Alternative metal; hard rock; funk metal
- Length: 4:54
- Label: Epic; CBS/Sony
- Songwriters: Corey Glover; Vernon Reid; Muzz Skillings; Will Calhoun
- Producer: Ed Stasium

Living Colour singles chronology
"Middle Man" (1988)	"Cult of Personality" (1988)	"Glamour Boys" (1988)

Music video
- "Cult of Personality" on YouTube

Professional ratings
Review scores
Source	Rating
Bravo	3/3 stars

"Cult of Personality" is a song by American rock band Living Colour, featured as the opening track and second single from their debut studio album Vivid (1988). The song was released in 1988, and reached No. 13 on the US Billboard Hot 100 and No. 9 on the Billboard Album Rock Tracks chart. It won the Grammy Award for Best Hard Rock Performance at the 32nd Annual Grammy Awards. Its music video won the MTV Video Music Award for Best Group Video and MTV Video Music Award for Best New Artist.

The band's guitarist and founder, Vernon Reid, described the song as very special for the band not just for its commercial success but because it was essentially written in just one rehearsal session. The riff was stumbled upon while practicing something else and by the end of the session they had written what was to become their best known song. The title comes from a psychological phenomenon called cult of personality, and the lyrics contain many political references.

The song was ranked No. 69 on VH1's "100 Greatest Hard Rock Songs". The solo was ranked No. 87 in Guitar World's "100 Greatest Guitar Solos" list and No. 23 on their list of the "25 Greatest Wah Solos of All Time".

== Background and composition ==
The title comes from Soviet leader Nikita Khrushchev's 1956 anti-Stalin report, "On the Cult of Personality and Its Consequences". During rehearsals at the band's loft in Brooklyn in 1987, lead singer Corey Glover was humming some notes. Guitarist Vernon Reid opened his small notebook of quotes and phrases for lyrical inspiration, and turned to a page where he had scribbled, "Look in my eyes, what do you see? The cult of personality."

In 2018, Reid said, "The whole idea was to move past the duality of: That's a good person and that's a bad person. What do the good and the bad have in common? Is there something that unites Gandhi and Mussolini? Why are they who they are? And part of it is charisma." In 2016, he also said, "'Cult of Personality' was about celebrity, but on a political level. It asked what made us follow these individuals who were larger than life yet still human beings. Aside from their social importance, Malcolm X and Martin Luther King both looked like matinee idols. That was a strong part of why their messages connected. Even now it's why Barack Obama has that certain something."

The signature riff was improvised at the same rehearsal. Reid said, "That cool riff had a Zeppelin-ish vibe, but also a Mahavishnu Orchestra thing going on. It was based on a series of notes that Corey had sung – my attempt to repeat that [on guitar]. I already had the lyrics, but with the music in place it very quickly took on a life of its own."

== Political figures referenced ==
"Cult of Personality" includes several audio samples of speeches from 20th-century political leaders.

The song begins with an edited quote from the beginning of "Message to the Grass Roots", a speech by Malcolm X: "... And during the few moments that we have left, ... We want to talk right down to earth in a language that everybody here can easily understand."

During a rest in the music at 4:35, John F. Kennedy's inaugural address is heard ("Ask not what your country can do for you ...").

The song ends with Franklin D. Roosevelt saying "The only thing we have to fear is fear itself", from his first inaugural address.

The lyrics mention Kennedy, Benito Mussolini, Joseph Stalin, and Mahatma Gandhi. According to Vernon Reid, Adolf Hitler was originally also in the lyrics but was pulled due to fear that referring to him would be misconstrued and too controversial.

== Track listings ==
US and Canadian 7-inch single, US cassette single

1. "Cult of Personality" – 4:53
2. "Funny Vibe" – 4:19

UK 7-inch single

A. "Cult of Personality" – 4:54
B. "What's Your Favorite Color? (Theme Song)" – 3:56

UK CD single (1988)

1. "Cult of Personality" – 4:53
2. "Open Letter (To a Landlord)" (live) – 5:39
3. "Middle Man" (live) – 3:43

UK CD single (1989)

1. "Cult of Personality" – 4:54
2. "Should I Stay or Should I Go" – 2:27
3. "What's Your Favorite Color? (Theme Song)" – 3:56

European 7-inch single

A. "Cult of Personality" – 4:53
B. "Open Letter (To a Landlord)" – 5:30

Australian 7-inch single

A. "Cult of Personality" – 4:53
B. "Desperate People" – 5:35

== Charts ==
=== Weekly charts ===
Chart (1989–1991)	Peak position
Australia (ARIA)	54
Canada Top Singles (RPM)	84
New Zealand (Recorded Music NZ)	3
UK Singles (Official Charts)	67
US Billboard Hot 100	13
US Mainstream Rock Airplay (Billboard)	9
US Cash Box Top 100	8

Chart (2021)	Peak position
US Rock Digital Songs (Billboard)	10

=== Year-end charts ===
Chart (1989)	Position
New Zealand (RIANZ)	11
US Album Rock Tracks (Billboard)	35

== Certifications ==
Region	Certification	Certified units/sales
United Kingdom (BPI)	Silver	200,000^{‡}
^{‡} Sales+streaming figures based on certification alone.

== Release history ==
Region	Date	Format(s)	Label(s)	Ref.
United States	1988	7-inch vinyl; cassette	Epic	
United Kingdom	May 1, 1989	7-inch vinyl; 12-inch vinyl	Epic	

== In popular culture ==
- Professional wrestler and former mixed martial artist CM Punk has used the song as his entrance music in WWE, Ring of Honor, Ultimate Fighting Championship, and All Elite Wrestling. The band performed the song live during Punk's entrance at WrestleMania 29, and again 12 years later at WrestleMania 41. The 2023 remastered version of the 2007 re-recorded version that originally appeared in Guitar Hero III: Legends of Rock was used for CM Punk's WWE return at Survivor Series: WarGames in November 2023 and has been using it since then. As a result of Punk's return, the English football club Arsenal who frequently play wrestling entrance themes at their home games at the Emirates Stadium played the remake before their UEFA Champions League match against RC Lens.
- Philadelphia Phillies slugger Kyle Schwarber uses the song as one of his walk-up songs.
