= Muzz Skillings =

American singer-songwriter

Muzz Skillings (born January 6, 1964, in Queens, New York) is an American bassist, singer, guitarist and songwriter. He is best known for being the original bassist with Living Colour.

Skillings joined Living Colour in 1986 and played bass, sang backing vocals. He co-wrote songs on their 1988 debut album Vivid, and follow up Time's Up, both best-selling and Grammy-winners. He also contributed to the 1991 EP Biscuits. Skillings' use of melodic, complex and moving bass lines during his time with Living Colour left him with high acclaim from musicians worldwide.

Skillings's departure from the band in 1992 was due to musical differences and a desire to branch off and evolve musically outside of Living Colour. He was replaced in the band by Doug Wimbish. Skillings left under good terms (as indicated in his liner notes printed in the album sleeve of Living Colour's 1995 best-of compilation, Pride) and has returned to the band on occasion to substitute for Wimbish or sit in as a special guest.

Skillings has since led a band called Medicine Stick, in which he plays electric guitar and sings lead vocals, as well as writes the songs.

== Discography ==
=== with Living Colour ===
- Vivid (1988)
- Time's Up (1990)
- Biscuits (EP) (1991)
- Live from CBGB's (2005) - Recorded live on 19 December 1989
