= Open Letter (To a Landlord) =

Single by Living Colour

from the album Vivid
- Released: 1989
- Genre: Funk rock; hard rock
- Length: 5:30
- Label: Epic
- Songwriters: Vernon Reid; Tracie Morris
- Producer: Ed Stasium

Living Colour singles chronology
"Glamour Boys" (1988)	"Open Letter (To a Landlord)" (1989)	"Funny Vibe" (1988)

Music video
- "Open Letter (To a Landlord)" on YouTube

"Open Letter (To a Landlord)" is a song by American rock band Living Colour. A power ballad, it was released as the fourth single from their 1988 debut album, Vivid. The song reached No. 82 on the Billboard Hot 100.

== Critical reception ==
Malu Halasa, reviewer of British music newspaper Record Mirror, called Vernon Reid a "reputed virtuoso in the axe licks department" and described "Open Letter" as "practically atonal with not a pop melody in sight". Ian Gittins of Melody Maker wrote, "Living Colour also deserve far more applause than they've often had in these pages", advising them to "have some more fun".

== Track listing ==
7" single

Side one
No.	Title	Length
1.	"Open Letter (To a Landlord)"	5:30

Side two
No.	Title	Length
2.	"Talkin' 'bout a Revolution" (live)	6:00

12" single

Side one
No.	Title	Length
1.	"Open Letter (To a Landlord)"	5:30
2.	"Cult of Personality" (live)	5:06

Side two
No.	Title	Length
3.	"Talkin' 'bout a Revolution" (live)	4:29

== Charts ==
Chart (1989)	Peak position
US Mainstream Rock	11
RIANZ Singles Chart	11
US Billboard Hot 100	82
