= Funny Vibe (song) =

Single by Living Colour

from the album Vivid
- Released: 1988
- Recorded: 1987–1988
- Genre: Funk; hip hop; rap metal
- Label: Epic
- Songwriter: Vernon Reid

Living Colour singles chronology
"Open Letter (To a Landlord)" (1988)	"Funny Vibe" (1988)	"Funny Vibe (remix)" (1989)

Music video
- "Funny Vibe" on YouTube

"Funny Vibe" is a single released by Living Colour from their 1988 debut album Vivid. It features Chuck D and Flavor Flav from Public Enemy.

Rolling Stone magazine wrote about the song in a 1990 Living Colour interview, saying "The words – "No I'm not gonna hurt you/No I'm not gonna harm you/And I try not to hate you/So why you want to give me that/Funny Vibe!" – spelled out with machine-gun eloquence Reid's rage and frustration in communicating his vision to a rigid, unapologetic music industry rife with racial stereotyping and de facto discrimination."
