= Living Colour =

American rock band

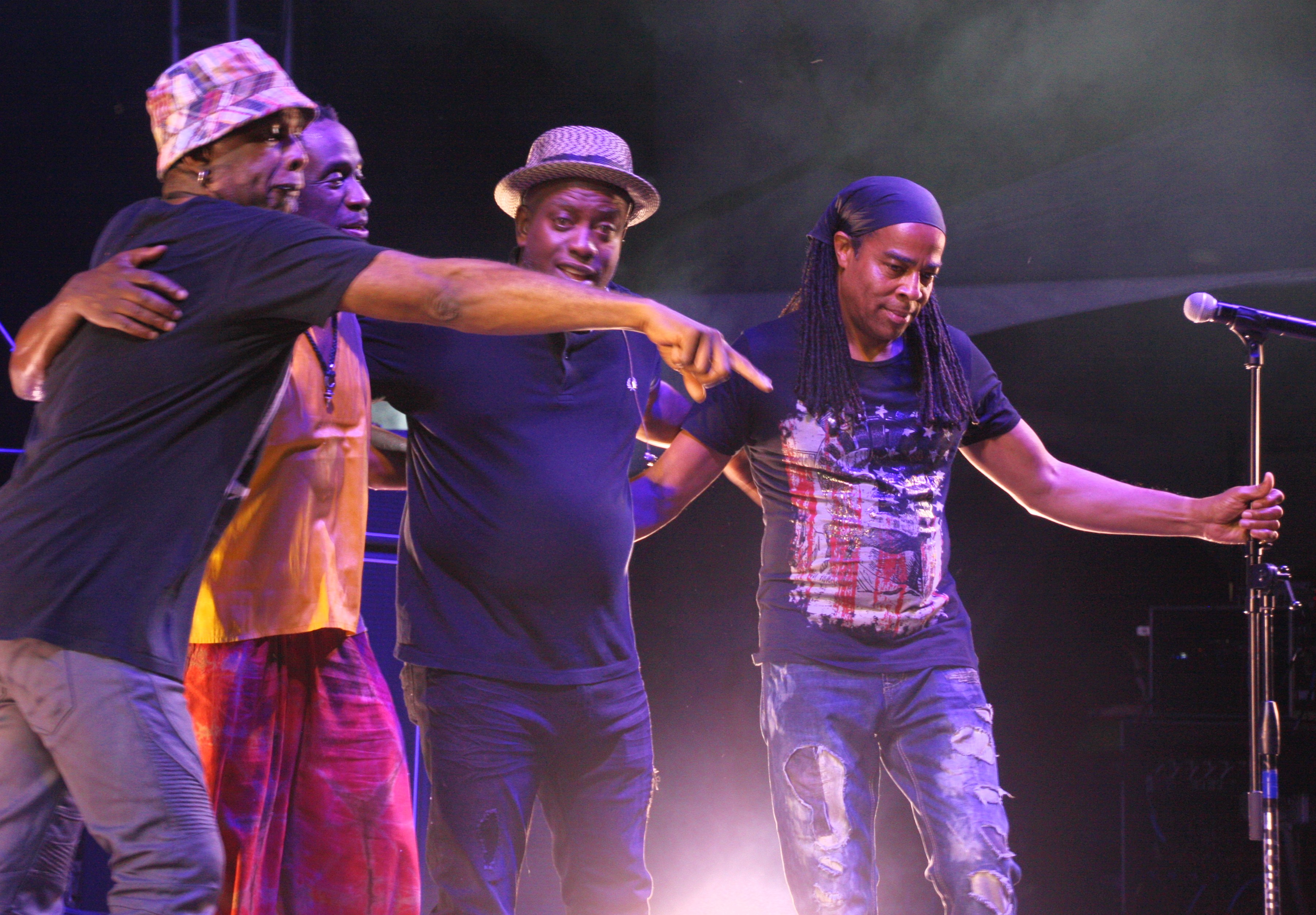
- Living Colour in 2017

Background information
- Origin: New York City, U.S.
- Genres: Hard rock; funk metal; alternative metal
- Works: Discography
- Years active: 1984–1995; 2000–present
- Labels: Megaforce; Sanctuary; Epic
- Members: Vernon Reid; Corey Glover; Will Calhoun; Doug Wimbish
- Past members: Alex Mosely; Jerome Harris; Carl James; Greg Carter; Pheeroan akLaff; J. T. Lewis; Geri Allen; D. K. Dyson; Mark Ledford; Muzz Skillings

Living Colour is an American rock band from New York City, formed in 1984. The band consists of guitarist Vernon Reid, lead vocalist Corey Glover, drummer Will Calhoun and bassist Doug Wimbish, who replaced Muzz Skillings in 1992. Their music is influenced by progressive rock, heavy metal, funk, jazz, hip-hop, punk, alternative rock, delta blues, doo-wop, swing music, ska, yacht rock and barbershop quartet. The band's lyrics range from the personal to the political, including social commentary on racism in the United States.

Living Colour has released six studio albums. The band rose to fame with their debut album Vivid in 1988. Although they scored several hits, Living Colour is best known for their signature song "Cult of Personality", which won a Grammy Award for Best Hard Rock Performance in 1990. They were named Best New Artist at the 1989 MTV Video Music Awards, and won their second Grammy Award for their follow-up album Time's Up (1990). Their third album, Stain (1993), was also well received by music critics. After disbanding in 1995, Living Colour reunited in late 2000, and has since released three more studio albums: Collideøscope (2003), The Chair in the Doorway (2009), and Shade (2017). The band has been working on new material for the follow-up to Shade.

== History ==
=== Early years (1984–1986) ===
British-born guitarist Vernon Reid had formed several bands in the years before forming Living Colour in New York in 1984, using the British spelling of "colour". Reid assembled several bands under the name Vernon Reid's Living Colour from 1984 to 1986. Reid was well known on the downtown New York jazz scenes because of his tenure in Ronald Shannon Jackson's Decoding Society.

Early band members included bassists Alex Mosely, Jerome Harris and Carl James, drummers Greg Carter, Pheeroan akLaff and J. T. Lewis, keyboardist Geri Allen, and vocalists D. K. Dyson and Mark Ledford, with Reid occasionally singing lead vocals himself. The band's sound was vastly different from the songs later in their significant label recordings. Material from this period included instrumental jazz/funk workouts, politically pointed punk rock burners, experimental excursions via Reid's guitar synth, and an early version of the song "Funny Vibe", which was reworked for their debut album Vivid.

=== Mainstream success (1986–1991) ===
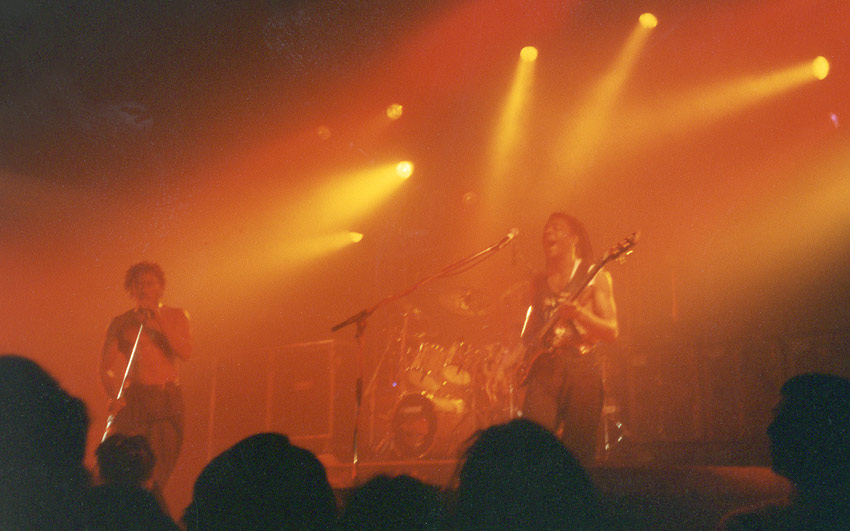
Living Colour in 1993

In 1986 a stable lineup was formed, consisting of vocalist/actor Corey Glover, guitarist Vernon Reid, bassist Muzz Skillings, and drummer Will Calhoun. After hiring managers Jim Grant and Roger Cramer, the band hired prodigy lighting designer Andy Elias in November 1986 to strengthen their live shows with explosive visual productions. The band became experienced at touring and performed regular gigs at the club CBGB. Around this time, their career also benefited from Rolling Stones singer Mick Jagger's involvement. Jagger's interest in Living Colour was piqued when Vernon Reid auditioned for the album Primitive Cool; Jagger then arranged to see them live at CBGBs. Jagger went on to produce two of their demos. His endorsement encouraged major record labels to renew their interest in Living Colour, resulting in a recording contract with Epic Records. Interviewed in 2018, Vernon Reid looked back on the deal as a bittersweet triumph; "We had to get the co-sign from a person who literally embodied what rock 'n' roll is, the fact that he had to come see us, and dig us, for us to get at the back of the line is crazy."

Vivid, released on May 3, 1988, gathered sales momentum when, later that year, MTV began playing the video for "Cult of Personality". The album reached No. 6 on the U.S. Billboard 200 chart. On April 1, 1989, the band performed on NBC's Saturday Night Live. Four months later, the band gained further exposure as an opening act, along with Guns N' Roses, for The Rolling Stones' Steel Wheels/Urban Jungle Tour.

In 1990, the band's second album, Time's Up, featured songs in a variety of musical contexts; jazz fusion, punk rock, Delta blues, hip hop (cameos by Queen Latifah and Doug E. Fresh), funk, thrash metal, jive, and hints of electronica were all represented. The album reached No. 13 on the Billboard 200, and won a Grammy Award for Best Hard Rock Performance. Other guests included Maceo Parker and Little Richard. The title track was "inspired" by pioneer punk group Bad Brains, Vernon Reid said in 2025 during a performance on NPR's Tiny Desk Concerts, with Corey Glover joking that "we stole it (the song) from them."

In 1991, Living Colour joined the inaugural Lollapalooza tour, and released an EP of outtakes entitled Biscuits.

=== Second lineup and breakup (1992–1995) ===
In 1992, Skillings left the band and was replaced by Doug Wimbish. This new lineup released their third album, Stain, in March 1993. The album reached No. 26 in the U.S., a further drop since its debut. Despite retaining their strong fan base, Living Colour disbanded in January 1995 after failing to settle on common musical goals during their fourth studio album sessions. Four of these tracks were included on the compilation Pride. Following the breakup, individual band members released a variety of solo efforts.

=== Reunion and subsequent events (2000–present) ===
Living Colour re-formed on December 21, 2000, at CBGB as a gig billed "Head>>Fake w/ special guests". Head>>Fake was the current drum and bass project headed by Calhoun and Wimbish. Glover was on the bill to sing a few songs, and Reid came on after three songs. The reunion was followed by the release of the band's fourth studio album, Collideøscope, in 2003, their first album not to chart in the United States, although it was critically praised. In 2005, Sony Records released Live from CBGB's, a live album recorded on December 19, 1989, as well as another best-of compilation, Everything Is Possible: The Very Best of Living Colour, with songs from Vivid to Collideøscope. On September 22, 2006, Skillings joined the band for the first time in fourteen years when they played at a private party that drummer Jack DeJohnette threw for his wife, Lydia. Wimbish could not come back from his base in London to play for the event, so Skillings agreed to take over for the special private event.

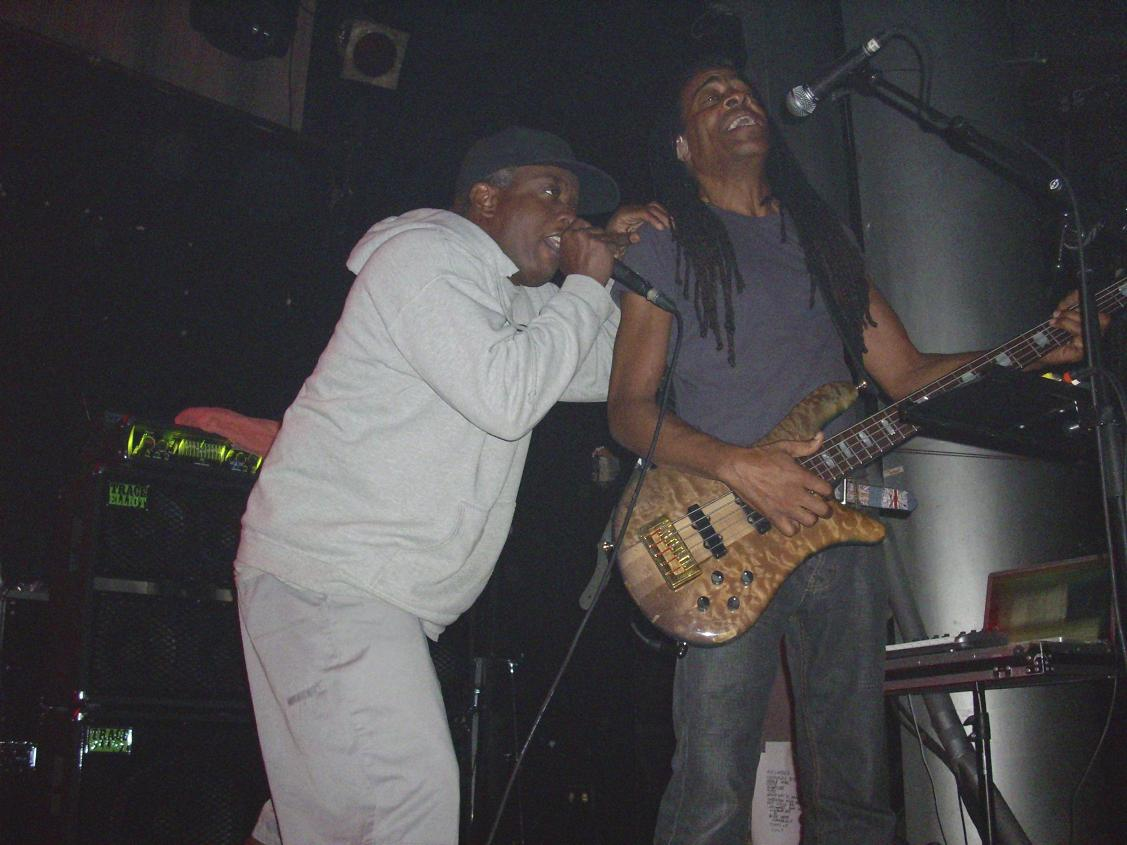
Corey Glover and Doug Wimbish (2008)

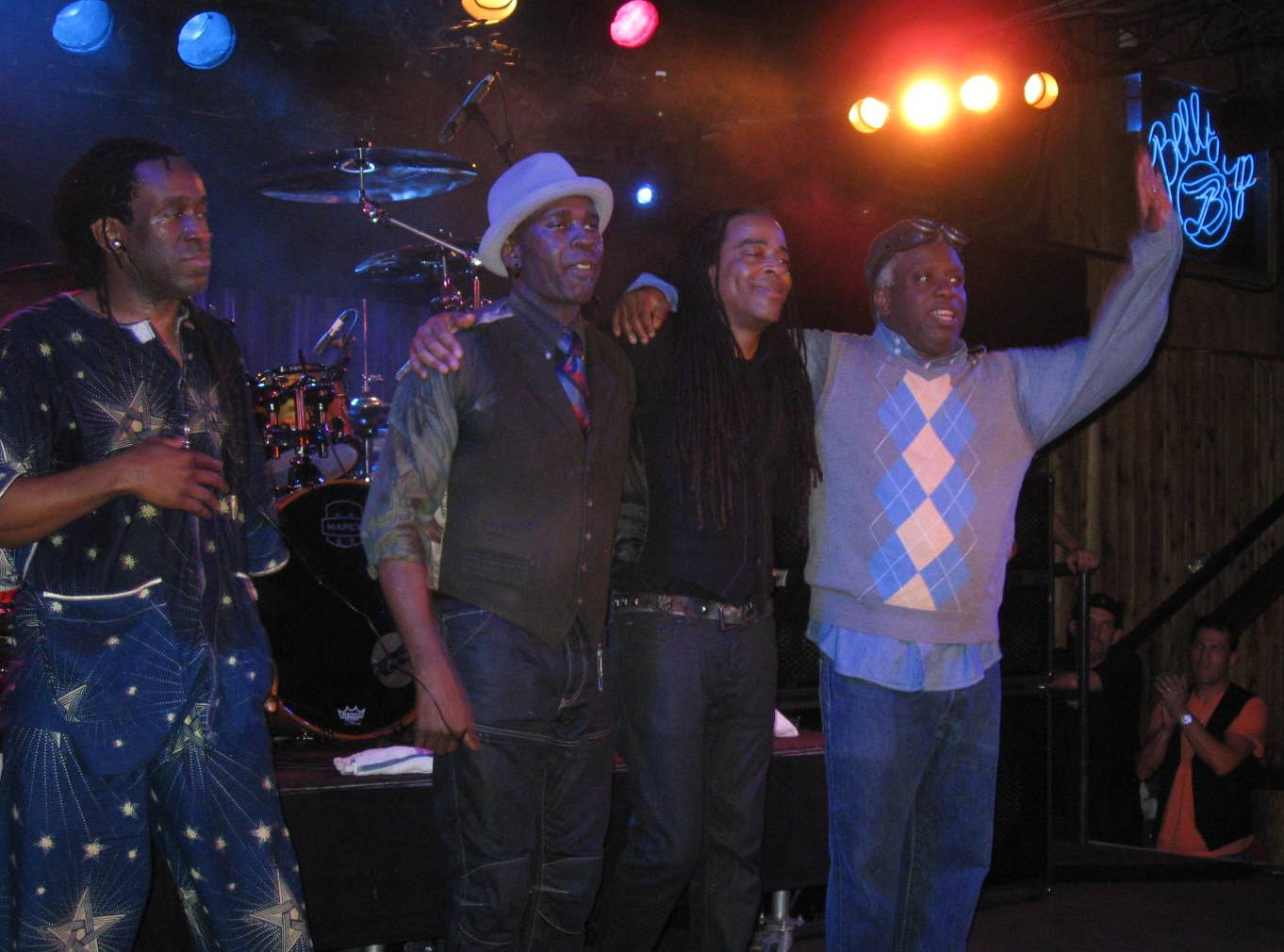
Living Colour, San Diego, California, March 2013

The band performed a week-long European Tour starting on December 12, 2006. In May 2007, the band released their first live DVD – On Stage At World Cafe Live. On July 11, 2008, the band performed at the 1980s hard rock-themed Rocklahoma festival at Pryor, Oklahoma. Once again, Skillings performed with them in August 2008 for a Black Rock Coalition Band of Gypsys tribute in Harlem. They performed "Them Changes" and "Power of Soul".

On October 25, 2008, MVD Audio and CBGB Records released CBGB OMFUG Masters: August 19, 2005 The Bowery Collection, a soundboard collection of songs from the Save CBGB's benefit show. On November 25, 2008, Inakustik and MVD released The Paris Concert, a DVD recorded at New Morning, in Paris, France, during their 2007 European Tour. The band released their fifth studio album, The Chair in the Doorway, on September 15, 2009, on Megaforce Records. The album sold approximately 2,800 copies in its first week and landed at No. 161 on the Billboard 200. This was the band's first album to chart since Stain in 1993. The band toured the world in support of the record.

In 2013, Living Colour performed "Cult of Personality" live during CM Punk's entrance at WrestleMania 29 for his match against The Undertaker.

On July 2, 2014, Living Colour announced on their official website that they were putting the finishing touches on their upcoming sixth album Shade, which was released on September 8, 2017. "Shade is the sound of a band coming to terms with its shadows and light, From the blue pulpit of Robert Johnson to the mean red streets of Brooklyn to the golden lure of Hollywood, Shade is the next chapter of a unique American journey," Reid stated on the official website. The album includes ten originals and three covers: Robert Johnson's "Preachin' Blues", The Notorious B.I.G.'s "Who Shot Ya?" and Marvin Gaye's "Inner City Blues" available on CD, MP3, and vinyl.

On August 19, 2016, the band released a cover of The Notorious B.I.G.'s "Who Shot Ya?" from an upcoming EP entitled Mixtape which was released on September 9. It features appearances from Chuck D, Black Thought, Pharoahe Monch, Prodigal Sunn, and Kyle Mansa. Also in 2016, the band performed "Cult of Personality" on The Howard Stern Show.

By late 2018, Living Colour had begun working on new material for a possible EP or seventh studio album. When asked about a month after the release of Shade if fans would have to wait another four years for the follow-up album, Reid replied, "Well I don't know about all that. It's intriguing to be back in this cycle."

On September 2, 2022 during a performance at Rock in Rio in Rio de Janeiro, Brazil, guitarist Steve Vai joined Living Colour on stage for a rendition of "Cult of Personality."

The band announced on December 10, 2022 that they had entered the studio to begin recording their seventh studio album.

In 2023, the band embarked on a US tour with Extreme.

In 2025, Living Colour performed "Cult of Personality" live during CM Punk's entrance at WrestleMania 41 for his main event match against Roman Reigns and Seth Rollins.

In April 2026, Reid announced that Living Colour will release their new album in 2027 "at the soonest".

== Artistry ==
=== Musical style ===
RockLists.com has noted that, "Living Colour came roaring out of New York in the late '80s with Vernon Reid on guitar, Corey Glover singing, Will Calhoun on drums and Muzz Skillings on bass, a band that could play just about anything and did: heavy metal, funk, progressive rock, jazz, hip-hop, punk and even a little barbershop harmony. Reid's guitar squeals and splinters, Glover sings like he's shouting down a riot, and the words go from the personal to the political, with plenty to say about racism in America." Rolling Stone has called the band "funk metal pioneers."

=== Acclaim and legacy ===
Living Colour was ranked No. 70 on VH1's 100 Greatest Artists of Hard Rock.

"Cult of Personality" was re-recorded for Guitar Hero III: Legends of Rock, with an updated solo, as the original masters could not be used.

In October 2006, "Love Rears Its Ugly Head" was ranked and voted 303 out of the 2006 songs featured in the Triple M Essential 2006 Countdown.

In early 2009, WWE used "Cult of Personality" in the video promoting the induction of Stone Cold Steve Austin into its Hall of Fame, a nod to his use of it in professional wrestling.

In 2011, WWE wrestler CM Punk returned with "Cult of Personality" as his theme song for his highly anticipated Summer of Punk run. Punk had used this song before when he used to perform for Ring of Honor. Upon joining WWE, he did not try to get the song as his theme because he believed that WWE would not get a song licensed for a mid-card wrestler. He used the song for his AEW run as well between 2021 and 2023. CM Punk also entered to the song for his debut mixed martial arts bout at UFC 203 and subsequently at UFC 225 for his fight versus Mike Jackson.

In 2025, Jeff Mezydlo of Yardbarker included the band in his list of "20 underrated bands from the 1990s who are worth rediscovering".

== Members ==
- Vernon Reid – lead guitar, guitar synthesizer, programming, laptop, backing vocals (1984–1995, 2000–present); lead vocals (1984–1985)
- Corey Glover – lead vocals, occasional rhythm guitar, tambourine (1985–1995, 2000–present)
- Will Calhoun – drums, percussion, keyboards, samples, loops, programming, backing vocals (1986–1995, 2000–present)
- Doug Wimbish – bass, drums, guitar, programming, backing vocals (1992–1995, 2000–present)

Former members

- Alex Mosely – bass
- Jerome Harris – bass
- Carl James – bass
- Greg Carter – drums
- Pheeroan akLaff – drums
- J. T. Lewis – drums
- Geri Allen – keyboards (died; 2017)
- D. K. Dyson – lead vocals
- Mark Ledford – lead vocals (died; 2004)
- Muzz Skillings – bass, backing vocals (1986–1991, one-off show in 2006)
- Doug Pinnick – lead vocals (2006; substitute)

== Discography ==
- Vivid (1988)
- Time's Up (1990)
- Stain (1993)
- Collideøscope (2003)
- The Chair in the Doorway (2009)
- Shade (2017)

== Awards ==
=== MTV Video Music Awards ===
- 1989 – Best New Artist ("Cult of Personality")
- 1989 – Best Group Video ("Cult of Personality")
- 1989 – Best Stage Performance ("Cult of Personality")

=== Grammy Awards ===
- 1990 – Best Hard Rock Performance (won) ("Cult of Personality")
- 1990 – Best Rock Performance by a Duo or Group with Vocal (nominated) ("Glamour Boys")
- 1991 – Best Hard Rock Performance (won) (Time's Up)
- 1994 – Best Hard Rock Performance (nominated) ("Leave It Alone")

=== Decibel Hall of Fame ===
- 2015 — Vivid inducted into the Decibel Hall of Fame.
