= Corey Glover =

American singer

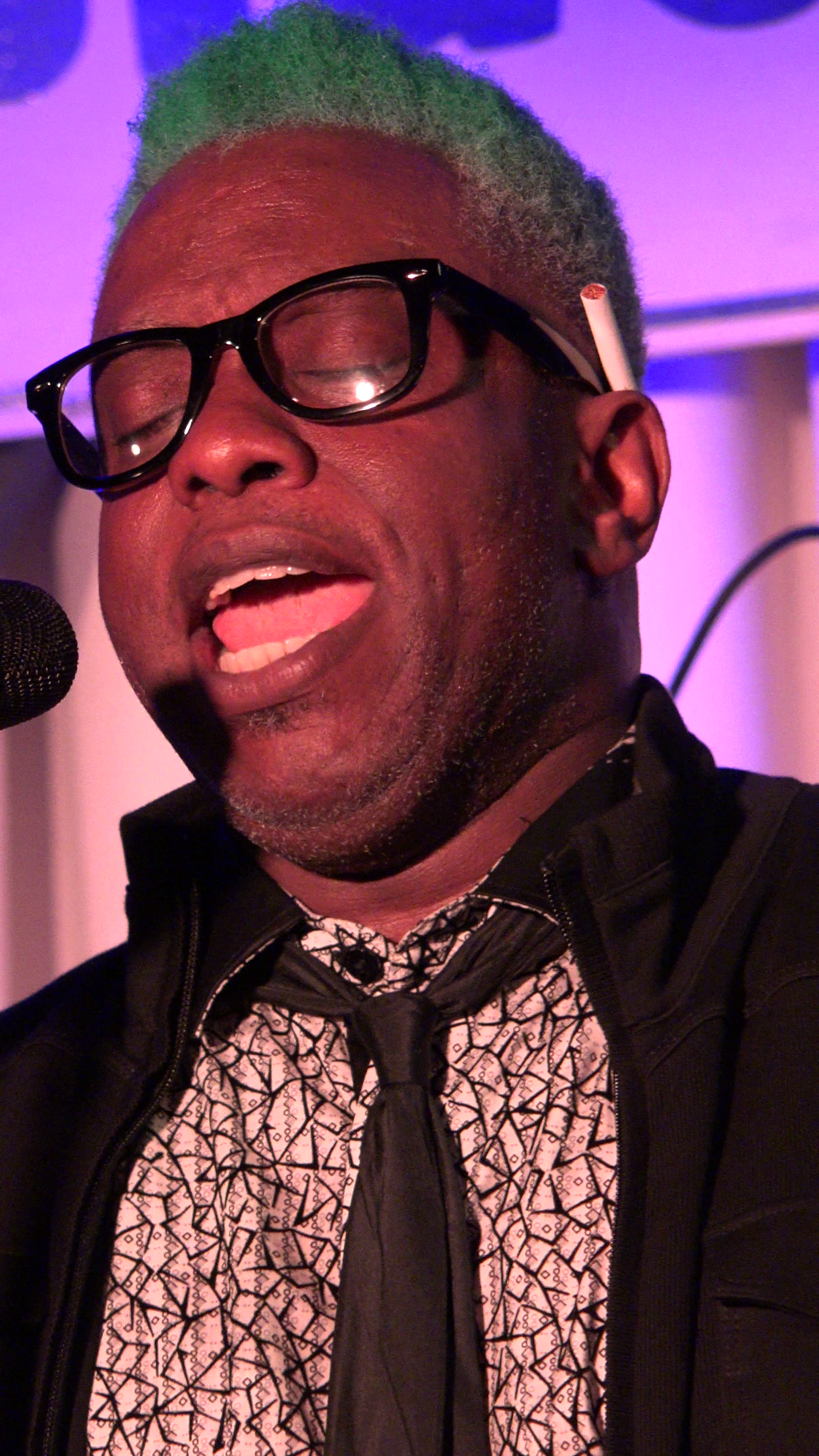
- Corey Glover performing with Living Colour in 2016

Background information
- Also known as: Reverend Daddy Love
- Born: November 6, 1964 (age 61); Brooklyn, New York City
- Genres: Hard rock; funk; jazz; R&B; alternative metal
- Occupations: Singer; songwriter; actor
- Years active: 1982–present

Corey Cornell James Glover (born November 6, 1964) is an American singer, songwriter, and actor. He is the lead vocalist of the rock band Living Colour and has toured as the vocalist for the funk band Galactic. As an actor, he played Francis in the 1986 war movie Platoon.

== Career ==
Glover was born in Brooklyn, New York City. He was an aspiring actor when guitarist Vernon Reid drafted him into Living Colour in 1985, reportedly after seeing Glover singing "Happy Birthday" at a friend's party. He appeared as Pvt. Francis of The United States Army in Oliver Stone's Vietnam War film, Platoon, and starred in a short-lived television series called Signs of Life. He has also hosted various shows on VH1.

Living Colour found immediate success with the release of their debut album, Vivid in 1988. It eventually went platinum in April 1989 and again five years later. The album's single "Cult of Personality" won the 1989 Grammy Award for Best Hard Rock Performance and the band was named Best New Artist at the MTV Video Music Awards. Living Colour released two more albums, Time's Up and Stain, (the former also won the 1990 Grammy Award for Best Hard Rock Performance) before splitting up in 1995. After the split, Glover started a solo career as Reverend Daddy Love and formed the band Vice with guitarist Mike Ciro.

In 1995, Glover participated with an ensemble of notable vocalists, guitarists, bassists, and drummers, including the London Metropolitan Orchestra, to record a Jimi Hendrix tribute album named In From The Storm. Glover provided the vocals for tracks 7 and 8, which were In From The Storm (title track) and Drifting.

Living Colour reunited on December 21, 2000, at CBGB's during a set by Will Calhoun and Doug Wimbish's live drum 'n' bass duo, Headfake. Glover guested on three songs, and Vernon Reid joined them three songs into the set. The reunion was followed by the release of the band's fourth studio album Collideøscope in October 2003.

In August 2006, Glover began co-headlining a national tour of Jesus Christ Superstar, playing the role of Judas Iscariot opposite Ted Neeley. He took the place of singer Carl Anderson, who had played Judas since 1971 alongside Neeley and was set to reprise the role, but had died of leukemia in 2004. The tour ran through 2010. Glover told Neeley that when he was a child, seeing the movie version of the show was what made him decide to be an entertainer. In June 2008, Glover left the show to rejoin with Living Colour and to work on the next CD.

Also, in a major 2006 performance, Glover sang "Superstar" (from the musical Jesus Christ Superstar) at the 29th Kennedy Center Honors to its composer, honoree Andrew Lloyd Webber.

On September 15, 2009, Living Colour released their fifth studio album, The Chair in the Doorway.

In 2010, Glover began touring as the vocalist for the band Galactic.

In 2011, Glover decided, through the use of Pledgemusic to ask fans to participate in a follow-up to Hymns. Instead of going through a corporate entity and record executives, Glover asked fans to help fund his next recording, to be released by late 2012.

Glover toured North America in 2012 with Galactic and Soul Rebels Brass Band. On March 29, 2012, the two bands appeared on the late night talk show Conan on TBS.

In November 2012, Glover released The Pledge through Pledgemusic – a Direct-To-Fan Project, which offers various incentives at different prices, as well as access to Pledger-Only items.

In 2015, he appeared on two tracks on indie rapper and producer Decora's debut solo record Bread and Oats. "Glover's mind-expanding contributions included "Nantucket," a breakup track with his "I met this girl from Nantucket / She will electrify your mind" phasing in and out over bird calls and flutes, and "Beautiful Bitch," a 7-minute epic with him intoning "why you such a beautiful bitch" over a spaced instrumental reminiscent of Mozart by way of Nine Inch Nails."

In 2018, Glover teamed up with guitarist George Lynch, drummer Chris Moore, and bassist Pancho Tomaselli to form the rock group Ultraphonix. He also formed a new metal project called Disciples of Verity, and an album was released in 2020.

In 2023, Billboard ranked Glover #45 on its list of 50 Greatest Rock Lead Singers of All Time.

== Discography ==
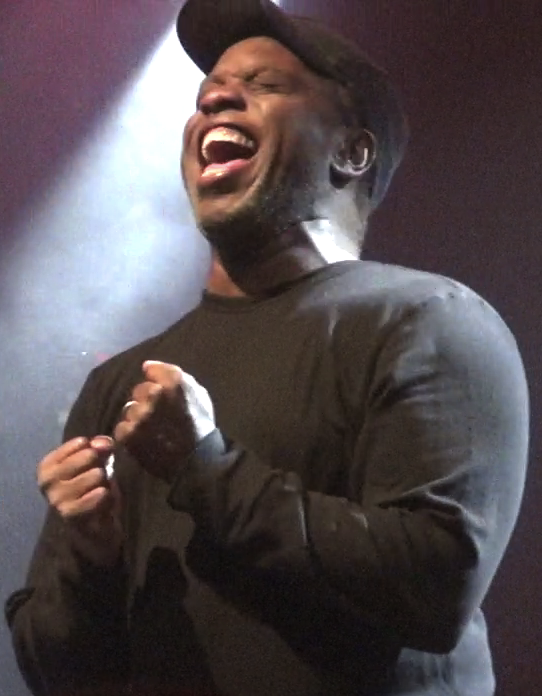
Glover performing with Living Colour in 2012

=== Solo ===
- In From the Storm – The Music of Jimi Hendrix (1995)
- Sonic Adventure Remix (1998)
- Hymns (1998)
- Live at CBGB's 12/4/97 (1998)
- Live at Wetland (1999)
- The Pledge (2012)

=== With Ultraphonix ===
- Original Human Music (2018)

=== With Disciples of Verity ===
- Pragmatic Sanction (2020)

=== With Sonic Universe ===
- It Is What It Is (2024)

== Stage work ==
- Fallen Angel (1994)
- Jesus Christ Superstar – Judas Iscariot (2006–2008)
