= Will Calhoun =

American drummer (born 1964)

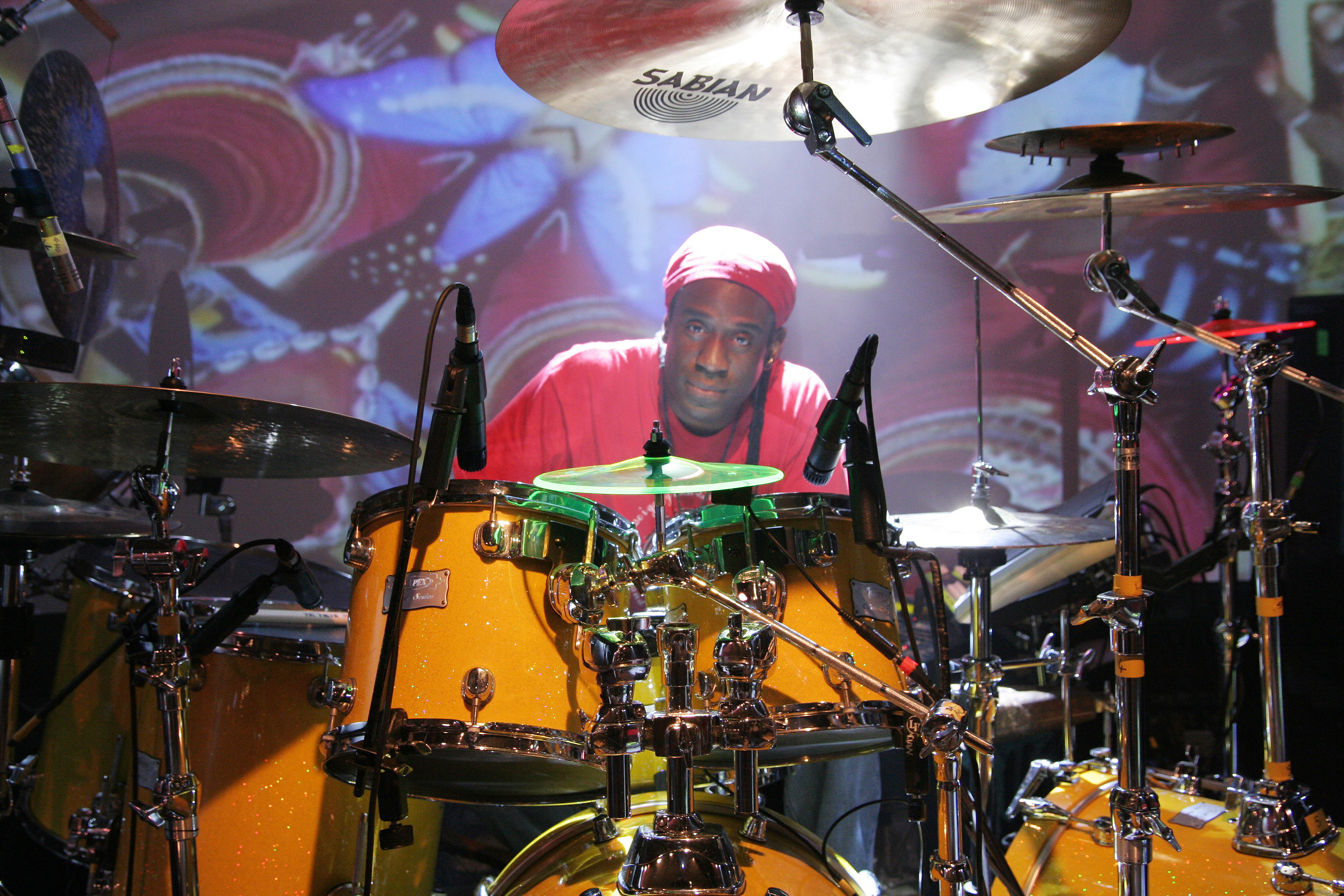
- Calhoun at a Living Colour concert in 2009

Background information
- Born: William Calhoun; July 22, 1964 (age 61); Bronx, New York, U.S.
- Genres: Pop rock; rock; jazz rock; heavy metal
- Occupation: Musician
- Instrument: Drums
- Years active: 1982–present
- Label: Motéma
- Website: www.willcalhoun.com

William Calhoun (born July 22, 1964) is an American drummer who is a member of the rock band Living Colour.

== Career ==
Calhoun was born in the Bronx, New York. He moved to Boston to attend the Berklee College of Music, where he graduated with a music production and engineering degree. He received the Buddy Rich Jazz Masters award for outstanding performance as a drummer.

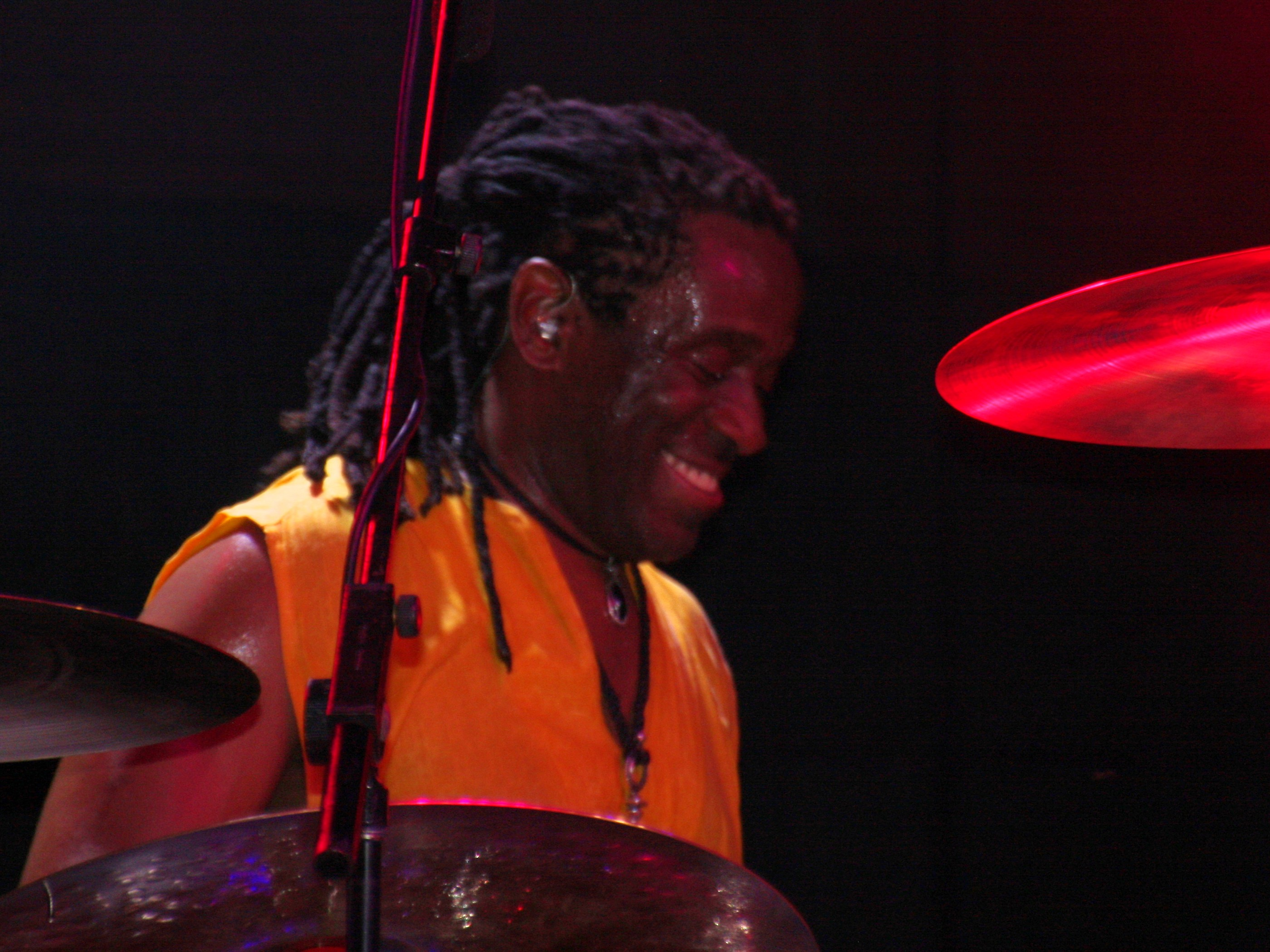
Calhoun in 2017

Though best known as the drummer of the rock band Living Colour, Calhoun has also played with Jungle Funk and HeadFake, recorded jazz albums as a leader, and appeared with Pharoah Sanders, B.B. King, Herb Alpert, Dr. John, Jaco Pastorius, Wayne Shorter, Marcus Miller, Public Enemy, and Ronnie Wood. He plays on "Crimson Deep" from the album What Lies Beneath by Finnish symphonic metal singer Tarja. He is also a member of the Stone Raiders musical band.

He was voted "Best new drummer of 1988" by Modern Drummer magazine's readers' poll, then again as "Number one progressive drummer" three times (1989, 1991 and 1992). He was named "Best Drummer of 1990" by Rolling Stone magazine's critics poll. He has won two Grammy Awards, one in 1989 for Best Hard Rock Performance by a Group while in Living Colour, then again for Best Hard Rock Performance with the band in 1990. Living Colour also won an international rock award in 1991 for Best Rock Band. In addition to drumming, Calhoun also wrote the songs "Pride", featured on Time's Up, and "Nothingness" from Stain.

Calhoun's drumming incorporates different stylistic influences and augmenting technologies. With Living Colour, he was one of the first drummers to blend advanced funk and fusion techniques with elements of hard rock and thrash metal. More recently, he has integrated drum and bass grooves, ethnic percussion, and sampling into his playing. He is a very physical player with a broad vocabulary from exact grooves to more free-form avant-funk and jazz approaches. He is also an avid user of the Korg Wavedrum, which allows him to integrate effects (including guitar pedals and other effects not typically associated with percussion instruments) into a single drum. Calhoun added a Mandala Drum into his setup. The Mandala is a dynamic multiple control zone electronic surface that uses sensor technology to detect where and how hard a surface strike occurs.

== Discography ==
=== Solo ===
- 1995: Housework
- 1997: Drumwave
- 2000: Live at the Blue Note
- 2005: Native Lands
- 2013: Life in this World
- 2016: Celebrating Elvin Jones

=== As sideman ===
With Santi Debriano

- Artistic License (Savant, 2001)

With Wayne Shorter

- High Life (Verve, 1995)

With various

- People Get Ready – A Tribute to Curtis Mayfield (1993)
