= Samchillian =

Electronic keyboard instrument invented by Leon Gruenbaum

The Samchillian Tip Tip Tip Cheeepeeeee (or Samchillian, for short) is a type of electronic keyboard instrument invented by Leon Gruenbaum, that uses keys of a QWERTY keyboard layout to trigger specific melodic intervals rather than traditional fixed pitches.

The Samchillian is listed as a "non-traditional" MIDI interface by the MIDI Manufacturers Association. According to this source, patent #5,565,641 is applicable to the device.

== Explanation ==
Synthesizers and MIDI instruments are commonly controlled with a piano-style keyboard, where each key triggers a specific pitch and are arranged in a low to high, left to right configuration, where the 12 pitches of the equal tempered chromatic scale occur in succession with natural notes lying closer to the player, and accidentals staggered slightly forward and away from the player. Traditionally, keys triggering natural notes are colored white, and the keys triggering accidentals are colored black. (Notable exceptions are the harpsichord and 1960s electronic organ designs such as the Vox Continental, which both invert the colors of the keys.)

The Samchillian, being interval-based in all twelve keys, does not require a visual distinction between natural and accidental notes. Its particular innovation is that a scalar interval is adhered to while using the same key. The Samchillian compensates for narrowing or widening of that interval, aka minor or Major 2nds, 3rds, 6ths, and 7ths – as well as flat 5ths or augmented 4ths. For example, the key for ascending 2nds in a diatonic major scale will compensate for distances of half or whole steps. So, in C Major, this key depression will go up a whole step from C to D, D to E, F to G, G to A, A to B, and a half step up from E to F, and B to C. The ascending 5ths key will increment a perfect 5th until it reaches B, where it will increment a flat 5th to the diatonically correct F natural. Similarly, the descending 4ths key will go from B down a diatonically correct 4th to F natural. (Of course, there are non-diatonic keys available for chromatic half, whole, and minor 3rd steps in either direction.)

Once a scale has been set, it is possible to play melodic sequences without altering finger positioning to compensate for half-step, whole-step alternation in a given scale or mode, and the spatial elements of physically moving low to high on an instrument are largely eliminated. This gives the user a notion of easy virtuosity, although maximum benefit from the instrument will only be gained by memorizing and making use of the interval keys to execute more specific musical ideas.

The Samchillian provides built-in access to non-diatonic scales. The basic Samchillian setup includes Chromatic, pentatonic, “Hebrew,” and microtonal scales, but it is also possible to create your own scales within the software. The single key directional interval function applies in these as well.

== History ==
In the late 1980s, keyboardist and woodwind player Leon Gruenbaum had the idea to invent a musical keyboard based on musical intervals, in contrast to the traditional fixed pitch keyboard, where a key activates one specific note. Initially, the idea came from thinking about the shape and melodic contours of modern bebop, and wanting an instrument that could more immediately access and focus on those kinds of melodic sequences, and melodic sequences in general. He names this instrument the Samchillian Tip Tip Tip Cheeepeeeee. Samchillian for short.

Originally, Gruenbaum planned to trigger the Samchillian via a traditional piano style keyboard, but with remapped functions, but later decided for functional and aesthetic reasons, to switch to an ergonomic keyboard made by Kinesis. Some touch sensitivity was sacrificed, but spatial access to intervals was greatly reduced. Via MIDI, the Samchillian has been able to control any number of digital sound sources, but also analog sources such as acoustic player pianos.

The key/interval assignments were decided on after Gruenbaum studied the alternate keyboard layout concepts of August Dvorak.

There are hardware and “at home” software versions of the Samchillian. The hardware unit features indicator lights based on the last 3 digits in binary of the MIDI note number, a knob that serves as a pitch wheel, the ability to plug in an expression pedal (controlling parameters of vibrato, wah, etc.,) and an 8-bit 11 kHz sine wave to allow the instrument to be used in a standalone mode without the need for an external sound source to be triggered.

Though it lends itself easily to monophonic playing, the Samchillian is also capable of playing chords, and players such as Rodney Clarke use it to trigger pads and samples. Although frequently used as a single note soloing instrument, it has been used for chords, percussion, and bass lines in ensemble settings. The percussion and bass roles are often facilitated by the serial mode feature. Serial mode as described in an article by Gruenbaum is an “interesting feature...(as is used in 12-tone music), in which notes are manually “recorded” and not allowed to repeat, and then can be played back backwards, forwards, by 2's or 3's etc.”

In 2011, Gruenbaum, earned third prize in the third annual international Margaret Guthman Musical Instrument Competition for the Samchillian tip tip tip cheeepeeeee. The judges included synthesizer pioneer Tom Oberheim. The organizer of this competition stated that "Some instruments – controllers – have this short or sometimes long learning curve, but once you get to a certain point, you know it, and that’s what it can do. And you cannot get better at it. I think the Samchillian is really an instrument with a learning curve that’s very long, and just like other acoustic instruments, violin, piano, there’s a wide range of technique. And this guy was really a virtuoso with this instrument. He was able to play chords, all kinds of arpeggiators. What I liked about it is it’s an instrument more than a controller. There’s always more to learn about how to become better with it. And I think that’s valuable."

In 2014, the Samchillian Tip Tip Tip Cheeepeeeee was added to the Grove Dictionary Of Musical Instruments in its 2nd edition, itself a part of The New Grove Dictionary of Music and Musicians.

On December 2, 2016, Adrian Romero announced on Facebook the addition of two new Samchillian features. At Romero’s request, a vibrato key was added to the instrument. “On 10/13/15, I asked Leon if he could add a vibrato function to the Samchillian, or at least an LFO effect that could be manually added to the ends of notes. After a few days of back and forth, testing different versions, the Samchillian officially has a vibrato key. It's a great feature, making the instrument even more expressive.” The second new feature was added by Leon Gruenbaum to accommodate his live loop based project, Creative Apocalypse. As some of the loops were slightly flat or sharp in pitch, Gruenbaum wanted the option of tuning the Samchillian to match the loop in use. He continued use of this feature in his duo project with drummer Gintas Janusonis, Collider.

In July 2022, Eventide released Misha, a collaboration with Gruenbaum. Misha is a Samchillian in a Eurorack unit with greater scale options and a powerful interval based sequencer/looping element. Misha adds the option of approaching the relativistic concept via a traditional piano style keyboard or the Samchillian QWERTY layout. Both are programmable options. The other method is via the interval buttons on the unit itself.

== Leon Gruenbaum’s Samchillian performance and recording with Vernon Reid and others ==
Shortly after creating the Samchillian, Gruenbaum met the guitarist Vernon Reid of Living Colour/Ronald Shannon Jackson And The Decoding Society fame, and began gigging in earnest on the new instrument, playing it with Reid's Masques around New York and in European jazz festivals.

Vernon Reid described keyboardist Leon Gruenbaum as an exceptionally inventive and versatile musician, comparing his intensity and unconventional approach to Joe Zawinul “on amphetamines.” Gruenbaum developed his own MIDI keyboard, a Samchillian Tip Tip Tip CheeePeeeee, whose design is based on relative pitch relationships rather than a conventional piano layout. Reid praised Gruenbaum’s ability to move effortlessly between styles ranging from bebop and barrelhouse to experimental, electronic music. He particularly admired Gruenbaum for developing an unconventional approach to keyboard improvisation, noting that his work represented a distinctive new way of thinking about the instrument.

Currently, Leon continues to play with Vernon Reid, James Blood Ulmer, and Burnt Sugar. He has released an album and EP with his own band Genes and Machines, performed solo as Creative Apocalypse, and released one album as a member of Collider.

== Samchillian Players ==
There are a growing number of performing Samchillian Tip Tip Tip Cheeepeeeee players, primarily concentrated in the New York/New Jersey area. Among them are jazz organist Brian Charette, Rodney Clarke, Adrian Romero, and Vernon Reid. Adrian Romero has recorded a number of pieces on the Samchillian, for his solo records, under his instrumental electronic cut-up moniker Radiomen Roar, and with the band Ünderbelly formed with ex-Blue Öyster Cult drummer Albert Bouchard. In 2010, Charette, Clarke, and Romero performed together with Leon Gruenbaum and percussionist Shawn Banks, improvising an entire performance where all bass lines, chords, loops, samples, and solos were played on Samchillians, ("4 Samchillian Jam.") Gruenbaum, Charette, and Clarke use split ergonomic keyboards manufactured by Kinesis, while Romero uses an old Mac G3 remote keyboard. A collection of videos featuring Samchillian as a trigger for a Yamaha Disklavier have been published on YouTube by a user going by theremind.

== Samchillian Tip Tip Tip CheeePeeeee discography ==
=== Leon Gruenbaum ===
- Vernon Reid's Masque - Mistaken Identity (1996)
- L.E.G. Slurp - Foolifingo! (1998)
- Yohimbe Brothers - Front End Lifter (2002)
- James Blood Ulmer - No Escape from the Blues: The Electric Lady Sessions (2003)
- Vernon Reid's Masque - Known Unknown (2004)
- Math Camp - Away (2006)
- Vernon Reid's Masque - Other True Self (2006)
- James Blood Ulmer - Bad Blood in the City: The Piety Street Sessions (2007)
- Graham Haynes - Full Circle (2007)
- New York Electric Piano - King Mystery (2008)
- Brian Charette - Missing Floor (2008)
- Gerhard Graml's Lunapark - Upright Acoustic (2009)
- Frattura/Waltz – S/T (2010)
- Adrian Romero – "Shame" (Radiomen Roar deconstruct), "The Long Walk/Robots of the Serengeti" (2011)
- Genes and Machines – Heart Shaped Ass (2011)
- Micah Gaugh – Pêssego do Verão (2015)
- Genes and Machines (as Leon Gruenbaum) – LG/EP (2016)
- Creative Apocalypse – SoundCloud collection (2016)
- Collider – Entanglement (2019)

=== Adrian Romero ===
- Radiomen Roar - "Son of Samchillian" (2008)
- Adrian Romero – 5 Little Boxes, "Little Boxes (Samchillian minor)" (2009)
- Adrian Romero - Real Life Is Better, “Don’t Invite The Rain” (2011)
- Ünderbelly – "Astronomy" (single) (2011)
- Adrian Romero - Madly... (for Allan Holdsworth) (2017)
