= Hervé Samb =

- Born: April 21, 1979 (age 47); Rufisque, Senegal
- Origin: Paris, France
- Genres: Jazz, world music
- Occupations: Guitarist, composer, arranger
- Instrument: Guitar
- Years active: 1990–present
- Labels: Euleuk Vision, Cristal Records
- Website: www.hervesamb.com

Hervé Samb (born 21 April 1979 in Rufisque, Senegal) is a Senegalese guitarist, composer and arranger based in Paris.

He learned jazz in Dakar under the Belgian guitarist Pierre Van Dormael, moved to France in the late 1990s, and worked as a sideman and musical director before developing, under his own name, a repertoire he calls "jazz sabar", combining jazz improvisation with the rhythms of the Senegalese sabar drum. On the release of Time to Feel in 2013, the French magazine Jazz Magazine described him as one of the major revelations to have emerged from the African continent.

== Biography ==
=== Early years in Senegal ===
Samb grew up in Rufisque, on the outskirts of Dakar. He began playing guitar at nine and recorded a first album at eleven with the band Force 5.

He discovered jazz through Pierre Van Dormael, the Belgian guitarist then teaching at the Dakar conservatory, with whom he studied weekly for three years. At fourteen he formed the Hervé Samb Quintet and performed at the Saint-Louis Jazz Festival, sharing the bill with Lucky Peterson.

=== Career in France ===
After settling in Paris in the late 1990s, Samb first worked as a sideman with Boney Fields, then with Amadou & Mariam, with whom he made his first international tour. He went on to work with David Murray, the World Saxophone Quartet, Meshell Ndegeocello and Jimmy Cliff. He also spent time in Chicago and New York City. Besides Van Dormael, he cites the kora players Noumoucounda Cissoko and Ablaye Cissoko among his influences.

From the 2010s he served as musical director on albums by Omar Pène, Lisa Simone, the American singer Toni Green and Somi. He produced and arranged Omar Pène's album Climat (2021), recorded between Dakar and Paris.

=== Jazz sabar ===
Beginning with Teranga, recorded in Dakar in 2016 and released in 2018, Samb developed a repertoire he calls "jazz sabar", built on the meeting of the rhythms of the sabar — a traditional Senegalese drum — with the harmonic vocabulary of jazz. He has summarised the idea as jazz that speaks Wolof.

Benn, his first entirely solo record, appeared in 2021. It was composed during the Covid-19 lockdown, and the project was suggested to him by Somi, with whom he had worked for several years. One track, "Afrotopia", takes its title from the essay of the same name by Felwine Sarr.

Jolof (2023), recorded with his Teranga Band, continued the approach on acoustic guitar throughout. Writing in Le Monde, Fabien Mollon considered that Samb and his band take up the codes of the sabar tradition while bringing to them a spirit of freedom drawn from blues and jazz.

== Discography ==
=== Albums as leader ===
- Cross Over (2009, Cristal Records / Euleuk Vision)
- Time to Feel (2013, Euleuk Vision) — four stars in Jazz Magazine/Jazzman
- Teranga (2018, Cristal Records, CR270) — recorded at Studio La Factory, Dakar, in May 2016, with guest appearances by Adiouza, Souleymane Faye, Daara J, Mike Ladd and Ndiouga Dieng; reviewed in Songlines
- Benn (2021, Euleuk Vision / Absilone) — his first entirely solo album; the title means "one" in Wolof, and the record was written during the Covid-19 lockdown over weekly sessions across two months
- Jolof (2023, Euleuk Vision / Absilone) — awarded a "CHOC" by Jazz Magazine; reviewed in Songlines

=== Duo and group projects ===
- Solos – Duos, with Pierre Van Dormael (2008)
- Kharit, duo with percussionist Daniel Moreno (2011)
- Sawadu, trio with Brice Wassy (drums, vocals, percussion) and Hubert Dupont (bass) (2010, Ultrack, UTK 1001)
- With the Volunteered Slaves, the band led by saxophonist Olivier Temime: The Day After (2013) and Ripcord (2017, Cristal Records)
- With Nicolas Kummert Voices: One (2010) and Liberté (2014, Prova Records)
- With Aziz Sahmaoui & University of Gnawa: University of Gnawa (2011) and Mazal (2014, World Village)
- The Optimist, with the Toine Thys Trio (2019, Igloo Records)
- 4 Worlds, quartet with Danish violinist Line Kruse, bassist Gilles Coquard and Guadeloupean drummer Arnaud Dolmen (2026, Continuo Jazz)

=== Selected appearances as sideman ===
- David Murray & The Gwo-Ka Masters, Gwotet (2004, Justin Time Records) — guitar and composition, alongside Pharoah Sanders and Hamid Drake
- World Saxophone Quartet, Political Blues (2007, Justin Time Records)
- Meshell Ndegeocello, The World Has Made Me the Man of My Dreams (2007, Decca) — acoustic guitar alongside Pat Metheny on "Shirk", a duet featuring Oumou Sangaré
- Cheick Tidiane Seck, Sabaly (2008, Universal Music France)
- Touré Kunda, Santhiaba (2008)
- Oumou Sangaré, Seya (2009, World Circuit)
- Lisa Simone, All Is Well (2014, Laborie Records, LJ30) — guitar, alongside Reggie Washington on bass
- Salif Keita, Un Autre Blanc (2018, Naïve)
- Somi, Holy Room: Live At Alte Oper (2020) — featured guitar soloist

== Recognition ==
- 2021: featured guitar soloist on Somi's album Holy Room: Live At Alte Oper, nominated for Best Jazz Vocal Album at the 63rd Annual Grammy Awards
- 2022: nominated for Outstanding Musical Director at the Vivian Robinson AUDELCO Recognition Awards, for the musical Dreaming Zenzile, about Miriam Makeba, staged at New York Theatre Workshop
