= Kélétigui Diabaté =

Malian musician (1931–2012)

- Born: 1931; Mali
- Died: 30 November 2012 (aged 80–81) Bamako, Mali
- Occupation: Musician
- Instruments: Balafon, guitar, saxophone
- Years active: 1950s-2012

Kélétigui Diabaté (1931 – 30 November 2012) was a Malian musician, described as an "undisputed master" of the balafon, and as "one of the greatest figures in Malian contemporary music".

== Biography ==
Diabaté was born in 1931 into a family of well-known musicians, and learned to play guitar and saxophone as well as the balafon. In the late 1950s, he helped form the Orchestre de la Garde Républicaine (Première Formation), which toured West Africa. He became a founding member, as guitarist, of L'Orchestre National "A" de la République de Mali, also known as Formation A, which was set up at Mali's independence in 1960. An album by the band was belatedly released in Germany in 1970.

He then joined Les Ambassadeurs, the band led after 1972 by singer Salif Keita. He developed his style of playing after performing in concert with American jazz musicians, including vibraphonist Lionel Hampton and singer Ella Fitzgerald, while on a tour of the US in 1978 sponsored by the Rockefeller Foundation, and thereafter often used two balafons together, offset by a semitone.

He reunited with Salif Keita in 1989, performing on Keita's album Ko-Yan, and appeared on albums by many other musicians, including Zap Mama, Ketama and Bonnie Raitt. From 1993, he performed with the Symmetric Orchestra, led by the unrelated kora player Toumani Diabaté. Between 1998 and 2009, he played with guitarist Habib Koité's band Bamada, taking part in the group's touring project with the Art Ensemble of Chicago, The Art Ensemble of Africa. He also recorded his own album, Sandiya, in 2004, with the Belgian label Contre-Jour.

Diabaté died in Bamako in November 2012 at the age of 81. He had been performing until a month before his death.
