= Folon =

Folon may refer to:

- Folon Region, Ivory Coast
- Folon (album), a 1995 album by Salif Keita
- Jean-Michel Folon (1934–2005), Belgian artist
- FOLON, an abbreviation for fan video-game Fallout: London
