= Papa (album) =

Studio album by Salif Keita
- Released: 1999
- Label: Metro Blue
- Producer: Salif Keita, Vernon Reid

Salif Keita chronology
| Seydou Bathili (1997) | Papa (1999) | Mama (2000) |

Papa is an album by the Malian musician Salif Keita, released in 1999. It is a tribute to Keita's father, who died in 1995. Keita supported the album with a European tour. The album was nominated for a Grammy Award for "Best World Music Album".

The title track appeared on the soundtrack to the 2001 film Ali. "Tolon Wilile" was remixed by Joe Claussell for an extended dance 12-inch.

== Production ==
Recorded in Bamako, Mali, Paris, and New York City, the album was produced by Keita and Vernon Reid. It combined traditional Malian instruments and folkloric themes with contemporary fusion sounds. Grace Jones, Toumani Diabaté, and John Medeski contributed to Papa. Kélétigui Diabaté played the balafon; koras and djembes were also used. Keita sang in Bambara. "Mama" is about the marriage of Keita's daughter.

== Critical reception ==
Professional ratings
Review scores
| Source | Rating |
|---|---|
| AllMusic | 3/5 stars |
| Robert Christgau | A− |
| The Encyclopedia of Popular Music | 3/5 stars |
| The Gazette | 8/10 |
| MusicHound World: The Essential Album Guide | 4/5 stars |
| Orange County Register | 3.5/5 stars |
| (The New) Rolling Stone Album Guide | 4/5 stars |
| Spin | 8/10 |

Robert Christgau wrote that "Keita soars gravely in Bambara and sometimes English, his sand-blasted yearning finally kept in focus by a production that knows the difference between embellishing and bedizening." Milo Miles, in The Village Voice, stated that "there's more James Brown in the supersonic wails of the boogie-eulogy 'Bolon' than Keita has ever shown... The next track, 'Mama', sounds like a miraculous outtake from the Talking Heads' Naked." The Arkansas Democrat-Gazette determined that "the music veers from the traditional Mali underpinnings to embrace atmospherics, trip-hop, funk and fiery rock guitar."

The Independent called the album an "eclectic whirl borne along on beautifully elastic funk bass and percussion grooves, the tracks growing subtly denser as they proceed, while Keita offers impassioned advice and admiration." The Guardian noted that "songs like the hypnotic, trancelike 'Bolon', or 'Tolon Wilile' ... could well be hits on the club scene, and are matched by laments for lost friends that show the more soulful side of his powerful singing." New African opined that "the songs are profoundly personal, but some lacklustre passages suggest he is listening too hard to his American advisers." The Kansas City Star concluded that "when he's interacting with his background singers ... you can clearly hear the link between the Motherland and Motown."

AllMusic wrote that "light vocal pop music with touches of traditional instruments where necessary to keep just a bit of the traditional sounds in the background."

== Track listing ==
| No. | Title | Length |
|---|---|---|
| 1. | "Bolon" |
| 2. | "Mama" |
| 3. | "Ananamin (It's Been So Long)" |
| 4. | "Sada" |
| 5. | "Tolon Wilile (The Party Is On)" |
| 6. | "Tomorrow (Sadio)" |
| 7. | "Abédé" |
| 8. | "Papa" |
| 9. | "Together (Gnokon Fe)" |
