= New York Electric Piano =

American jazz band

- Origin: New York City, New York, U.S.
- Genres: Jazz
- Years active: 2003–present
- Labels: Buffalo Puppy; Fervor
- Members: Pat Daugherty; Aaron Comess; Tim Givens; Erik Lawrence; Leon Gruenbaum; Richard Hammond; Deanna Kirk

New York Electric Piano is an American jazz band created in 2003 by keyboardist Pat Daugherty. The band started as a trio with Aaron Comess (of Spin Doctors) playing drums and Tim Givens on double bass. For later albums, they expanded to six and then eight musicians. Their sixth album, Keys to the City, spent a month in the top ten of CMJ's Jazz Chart.

== History ==
New York Electric Piano began as a trio built around the sound of a Fender Rhodes. Daugherty, Givens, and Comess met in the late 1990s and started the band in 2003. The trio's first album, New York Electric Piano, peaked in the top 20 of the CMJ Jazz Charts.

In 2010, the band added a guitarist and a saxophonist and began to perform on a regular basis at the Zinc Bar in New York City. Their album Keys to the City (2011) spent a month in the top 10 of CMJ's Jazz Charts. In 2014 they returned to a trio with Richard Hammond playing bass. Their song "Party On" from their album Black Hole in One was adopted by the New Zealand rugby team All Black. In January 2018, their eighth album, State of the Art, was released by Fervor and included eight instrumentalists with Daugherty playing two keyboards simultaneously.

== Members ==
Pat Daugherty (leader, composer, piano, keyboard) worked with Blue Man Group, and he toured for ten years as pianist for the Martha Graham Dance Company. He has recorded with Snoop Dogg and Princess Superstar.

Erik Lawrence (saxophones, flute) is a founding member of the Levon Helm Band and has played on a multi-platinum album with the Spin Doctors. Till Behler (saxophones, flute) has recorded with the Brazilian Girls, Arnie Lawrence, and Sly and the Family Stone.

Leon Gruenbaum (keyboard) is a multi-instrumentalist who has worked with Vernon Reid and James Blood Ulmer. He created his instrument, the Samchillian keyboard. Teddy Kumpel (guitar) has worked with Joe Jackson.

Richard Hammond (bass) has toured with Joan Osborne, Patti Austin, and Tired Pony and performed with Bono and The Edge, Carlos Santana, Brian Blade, and Levon Helm. He played bass guitar in the 2015 Original Broadway Cast recording of Hamilton and performed in the Hamilton Broadway orchestra. Tim Givens (bass) has played for the Cecilia Coleman Quintet. He has toured with Lou Donaldson, Curtis Fuller, and Chris Barron and recorded with Ray Bryant and for HBO and Nickelodeon.

Aaron Comess (drums) is a founding member of the Spin Doctors. He has recorded four albums under his own name and has performed with Joan Osborne, James Maddock, Roswell Rudd, and Marius Muller-Westernhagen. Stephen Perkins (drums) has played with Jane's Addiction.

Deanna Kirk (vocals) is a singer-songwriter who has performed at Lincoln Center and Birdland. Ava Farber and Jennifer Conley are vocalists.

== Discography ==
Title	Label	Release date
New York Electric Piano	Buffalo Puppy	2002
War Oracle	Buffalo Puppy	2004
Citizen Zen	Midlantic	2005
Blues in Full Moon	New York Electric Piano	2006
King Mystery	New York Electric Piano	2008
Keys to the City, Volumes 1	Buffalo Puppy	2010
Keys to the City, Volume 2	Buffalo Puppy	2010
Black Hole in One	New York Electric Piano	2015
State of the Art	Fervor	2018
