= Vernon Reid =

British-American guitarist and songwriter

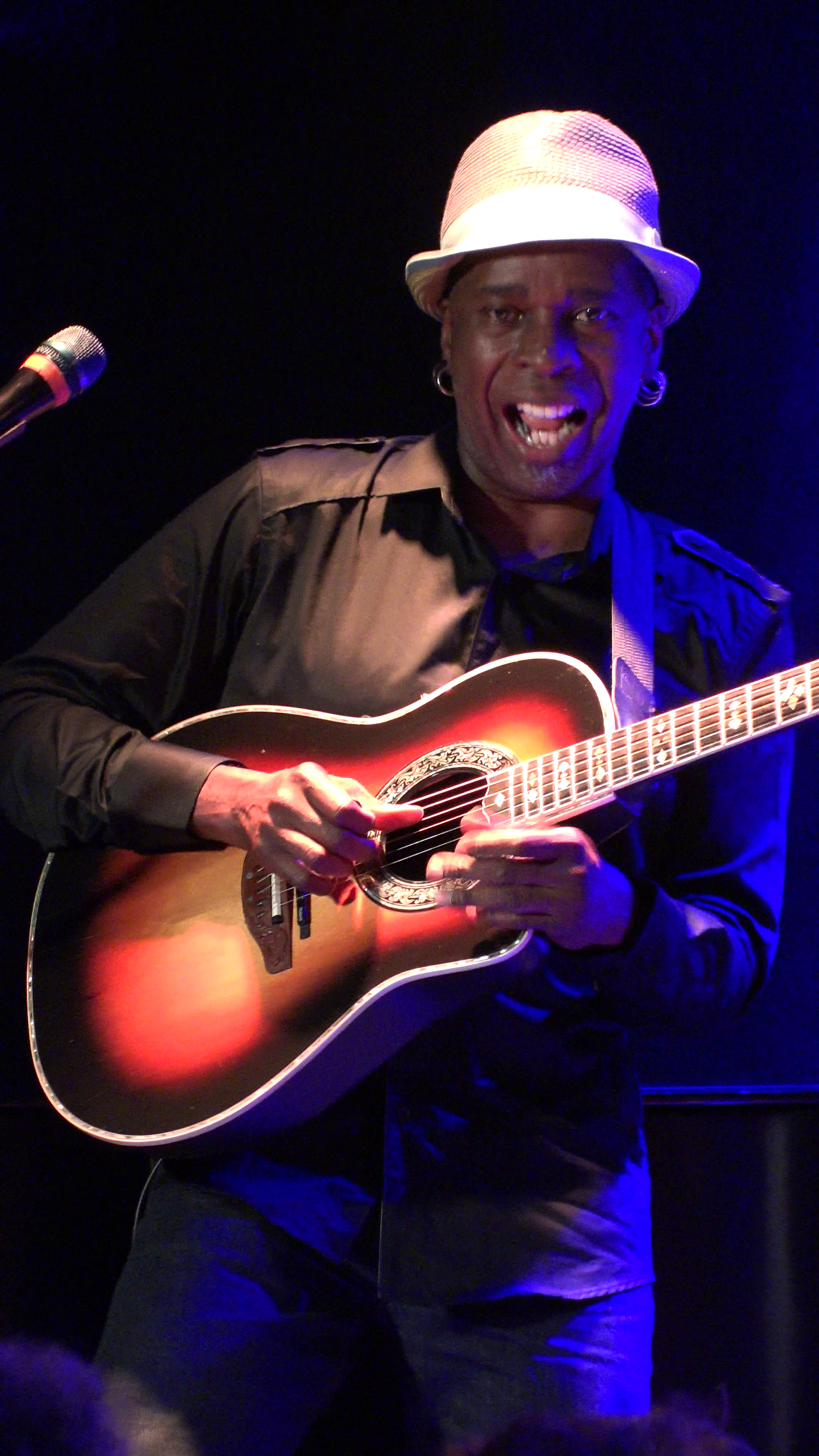
- Reid in 2016

Background information
- Born: Vernon Alphonsus Reid; 22 August 1958 (age 68); London, England
- Genres: Alternative metal; funk metal; heavy metal; hard rock; funk rock
- Occupations: Musician; songwriter; producer
- Instrument: Guitar
- Years active: 1979–present
- Label: Mascot
- Website: www.facebook.com/vernonreid

Vernon Alphonsus Reid (born 22 August 1958) is a British-born American guitarist, producer, and songwriter best known as the founder of the rock band Living Colour. Reid was named No. 66 on Rolling Stone magazine's 2003 list of the 100 Greatest Guitarists of All Time, and in August 2023, was ranked No. 42 in Rolling Stone's top 250 Greatest Guitarists of all time. Critic Steve Huey writes, "[Reid's] rampant eclecticism encompasses everything from heavy metal and punk to funk, R&B and avant-garde jazz, and his anarchic, lightning-fast solos have become something of a hallmark as well."

== Early life ==
Reid was born 22 August 1958 in London, England, to parents from Montserrat. In 1959 the family moved to New York City. He attended Brooklyn Technical High School, then New York University.

== Career ==
=== Early career ===
He first came to prominence in the 1980s in Ronald Shannon Jackson's avant-jazz-rock band The Decoding Society, and is on six studio and three live albums recorded with that group from 1980 to 1986. Smash & Scatteration was a duo record with guitarist Bill Frisell recorded in 1984. In 1985, Reid co-founded the Black Rock Coalition with journalist Greg Tate and producer Konda Mason.

=== Living Colour ===
Reid formed Living Colour in New York City in 1984, and its lineup was solidified in 1986. Their debut album Vivid was released in 1988 and was certified double platinum by the RIAA. Its successor Time's Up was released 1990 and was gold-certified. They received two consecutive Grammy Awards in the category of Best Hard Rock Performance. They opened for the Rolling Stones' 1989 "Steel Wheels" tour; and appeared on the first Lollapalooza tour in the summer of 1991.

Living Colour broke up in 1995 but reformed in 2000. Since then, they have released three more albums: Collideøscope in October 2003 on Sanctuary Records, The Chair in the Doorway in September 2009, and Shade in September 2017 on Megaforce Records.

=== Solo career ===
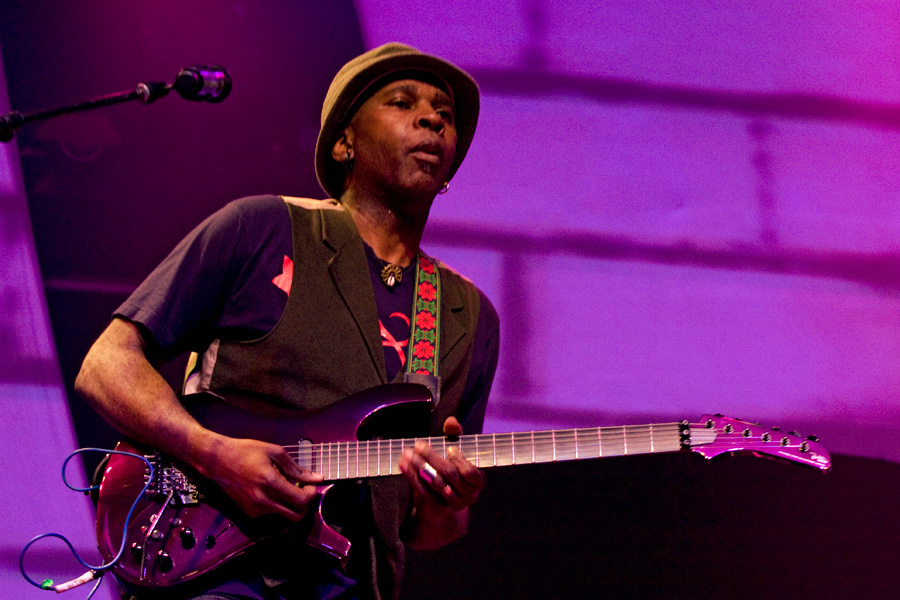
Vernon Reid, Moers Festival 2011

In addition to his work with Living Colour, Reid has been engaged in a number of other projects. He released Mistaken Identity, his first solo album, in 1996, and has collaborated with the choreographers Bill T. Jones on Still/Here and Donald Byrd on Jazztrain. He performed "Party 'Til The End of Time" at the Brooklyn Academy of Music (BAM) with The Roots, an end of the 2000 millennium tribute featuring the music of Prince's album 1999. He also composed and performed "Bring Your Beats" a children's program for BAM.

Reid has also undertaken significant work as a record producer, including two Grammy-nominated albums: Papa (1999) by the African vocalist Salif Keita and Memphis Blood: The Sun Sessions (2001) by guitarist James Blood Ulmer. Ulmer's subsequent albums, No Escape from the Blues: The Electric Lady Sessions (2003), Birthright (2005), and Bad Blood in the City: The Piety Street Sessions (2007), were also produced by Reid.

Reid also appears on Guitar Oblique (Knitting Factory) with guitarists David Torn and Elliott Sharp. Reid was also featured in the program presented by BAM and the Experience Music Project in Seattle entitled "Magic Science", which includes Medeski Martin & Wood and the Gil Evans Orchestra performing Gil Evans' arrangements of songs by Jimi Hendrix.

Reid composed the score for the film Paid in Full, directed by Charles Stone III (well known for creating the "Wasssup!" series of commercials for Budweiser as well as directing three videos for Living Colour) and released by Miramax in the fall of 2002. Reid also composed the score for the celebrated documentary Ghosts of Attica (directed by Brad Lichtenstein), which aired on Court TV in the fall of 2001 and has been featured at several film festivals. He composed the score for another documentary directed by Lichtenstein, Almost Home, which aired in 2006 on the PBS series Independent Lens.

Reid and DJ Logic, calling themselves "Yohimbe Brothers", released an album in September 2002 entitled Front End Lifter. The Yohimbe Brothers have been touring on and off since the release of the album. Reid was also the music supervisor for the film Mr. 3000, starring Bernie Mac and directed by Charles Stone III; the film was released in September 2004. Vernon's album with Masque (Leon Gruenbaum – keyboards and Samchillian, Hank Schroy – bass and Marlon Browden – drums), an instrumental album entitled Known Unknown, was released in April 2004, and on 18 April 2006 Vernon Reid and Masque released Other True Self, both on Favored Nations records, owned by another guitarist, Steve Vai.

Reid has a prolific session output in a variety of contexts. He has played live or on record with The Roots, Eye & I, Mick Jagger, Ambitious Lovers, Rollins Band, Spearhead, Public Enemy, Janet Jackson, Mariah Carey, Colonial Cousins, Tracy Chapman, Ronald Shannon Jackson, Don Byron, Defunkt, Santana, Bernie Worrell, MC 900 Ft. Jesus, B.B. King, Madeleine Peyroux, Meridiem, Jack Bruce, Terry Bozzio, Black Sugar Transmission (Reid solos on the title track of 2009's USE IT EP) and DJ Spooky.

Reid played at America's Millennium Gala, New Year's Eve 31 December 1999, and 1 January 2000, at the Lincoln Memorial, performing "Fortunate Son" with John Fogerty. Among those in the audience were President Bill Clinton and First Lady Hillary Clinton.

In March 2007, Reid played with Jamaaladeen Tacuma, and G. Calvin Weston at Tonic in New York and Tritone in Philadelphia, which led them to record as Free Form Funky Freqs. Their debut recording, Urban Mythology Volume One, was released in 2008.

In July 2008, Vernon Reid assembled a one-off solo band for his appearance at the G-TARanaki Guitar Festival in Taranaki, New Zealand, with keyboard player Jonathan Crayford, bassist Crete Haami and drummer Magesh Magesh. At the Puke Ariki "Midnight Session" concert, Vernon performed an all-star jam with Uli Jon Roth, Gilby Clarke and Alex Skolnick.

In 2008, Reid also played a series of Blue Note Club tribute concerts to the Tony Williams Lifetime in Japan with Jack Bruce, Cindy Blackman and John Medeski. In June 2012 the collaboration released a self-titled album Spectrum Road on the US jazz record label Palmetto. This was accompanied by a series of dates at large jazz festivals in North America and Europe throughout June and July.

In 2018, Reid signed with Mascot Label Group. He has an album slated for release in 2019.

In 2023, Reid wrote an article titled "The Promise And Peril Of AI Music: What Have We Unleashed?" that was published by Media Post.

=== An Underground Railroad of the Mind ===
In 2017, Reid debuted his semi-monthly broadcast on the streaming radio station Home. His show, titled "An Underground Railroad of the Mind", features Reid playing vinyl records from his record collection.

== Personal life ==
Reid resides in Staten Island with his wife Gabri Christa, a choreographer and filmmaker, and their daughter, born in 2003.

== Influences ==
Reid has cited Miles Davis, James Brown, Jimi Hendrix, Robert Fripp, John Coltrane, Frank Zappa, Jeff Beck, Carlos Santana, Eddie Hazel, John McLaughlin, Jimmy Page, Eddie Van Halen, and Dr. Know among his influences.

== Equipment ==
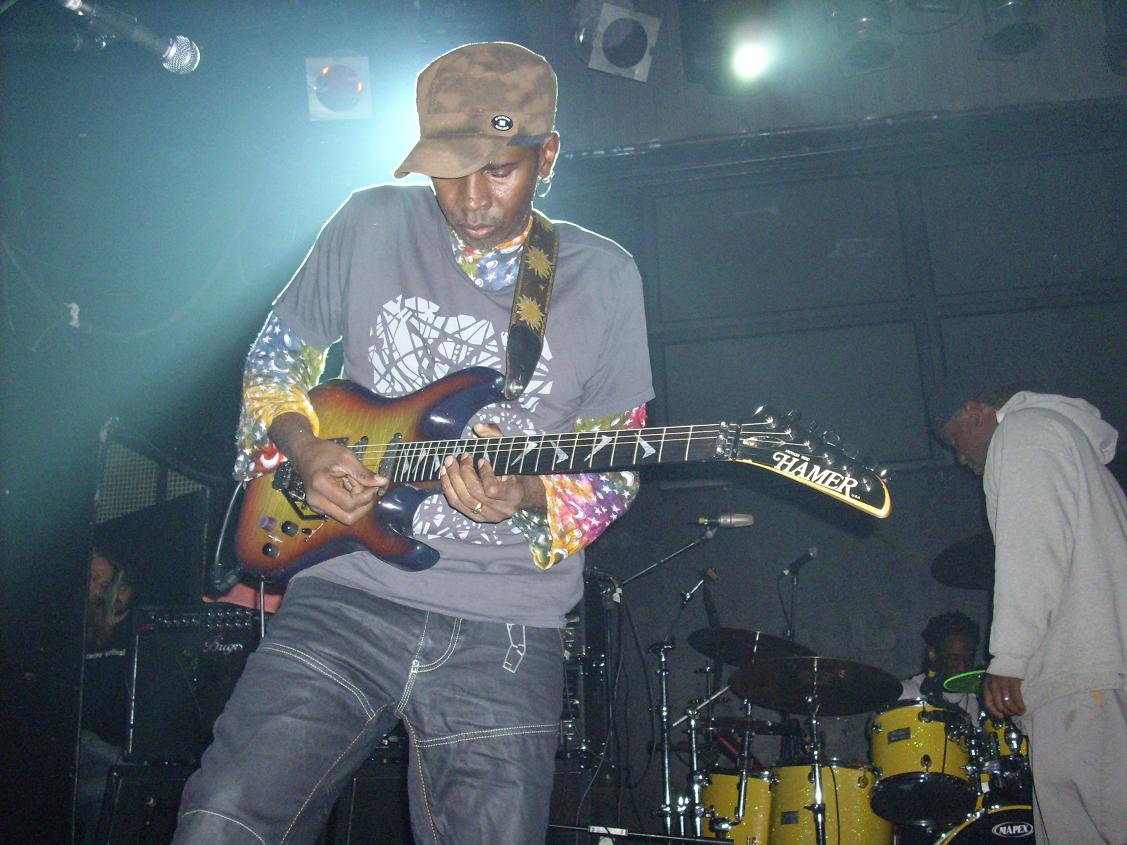
Reid in 2008

During the early years of Living Colour, Reid used a multi-colored ESP Mirage with EMG pickups, and he was an endorser of the A/DA MP-1 preamp. During the mid-1980s, Reid commissioned a highly figured maple custom guitar from Vancouver-based luthier Martini Guitars. This guitar was later acquired by Bob Wiseman, a founding member of the band Blue Rodeo. In later years, Reid has used custom Hamer guitars, and started a relationship with Parker Guitars, who built the DF824VR Vernon Reid signature model based on their Dragonfly design. it has EMG-X pickups in a H SS layout with 5-way switching system, a Floyd Rose vibrato (a first for Parker), and a Roland GK divided pickup. In 2016, he switched to PRS and was working on a signature model with them. The result is the PRS S2 VR Vela.

ESP Released the 86-run limited edition Cult '86 based on the original used on "Cult of Personality."

In 2024, he switched to Reverend Guitars, playing models from the Vernon Reid signature Totem series.

== Selected discography ==
=== With Masque ===
- Mistaken Identity (Sony, 1996)
- Known Unknown (Sony, 2004)
- Other True Self (2006)

=== With Yohimbe Brothers ===
- Front End Lifter (2002)
- The Tao of Yo (2004)

=== Obscure and/or unreleased ===
- This Little Room (Sony, 2000)

=== Solo ===
- Hoodoo Telemetry (2025)

=== In collaboration ===
- With John Zorn: The Big Gundown: John Zorn plays the music of Ennio Morricone (Icon Records, 1985)
- With Bill Frisell: Smash & Scatteration (Minor Music, 1984)
- With Elliott Sharp and David Torn: GTR OBLQ (1998)
- With Melvin Gibbs/Mary Halvorson/Lee Ranaldo/Vernon Reid/Elliott Sharp Christian Marclay: Graffiti Composition (2010; Dog w/ a Bone Records)
- With Jack Bruce, John Medeski and Cindy Blackman Santana: Spectrum Road (2012)
- With The Big Ol' Nasty Getdown. Appears on 'Creatures of Habit' (Featuring Angelo Moore) from The Big Ol' Nasty Getdown 'Volume 2' (2017)

With Free Form Funky Freqs

- Urban Mythology Volume One (2008)
- Bon Vivant (2013)
- Hymn of the 3rd Galaxy (Ropeadope, 2022)

=== As sideman ===
With Geri Allen

- The Gathering (Verve, 1998)

With Cindy Blackman

- Another Lifetime (4Q, 2010)

With Jack Bruce

- More Jack than God (Sanctuary Records Group Ltd., 2003)

With Tracy Chapman

- Matters of the Heart (Elektra Records, 1992)

With Jay Hoggard

- Riverside Dance (India Navigation, 1985)

With Whitney Houston

- The Bodyguard (Arista Records, 1992)

With Ronald Shannon Jackson and the Decoding Society

- Mandance (Antilles, 1982)
- Barbeque Dog (Antilles, 1983)
- Montreux Jazz Festival (Knit Classics, 1983)
- Decode Yourself (Island, 1985)

With Mick Jagger

- Primitive Cool (Columbia Records, 1987)

With Garland Jeffreys

- Don't Call Me Buckwheat (RCA Records, 1991)

With K'naan

- Troubadour (A&M, 2009)

With Public Enemy

- Yo! Bum Rush the Show (Def Jam, 1987)

With DJ Spooky and Dave Lombardo

- Drums of Death (Thirsty Ear, 2005)

With Mitch Winston and the Band of Natural Selection

- Right Back (2002)

== Media appearances ==
- Cyberpunk (1990)
