= Amen (Salif Keita album) =

Studio album by Salif Keita
- Released: 1991
- Recorded: 1991
- Genres: World; worldbeat
- Length: 43:50
- Language: Malinké
- Label: Mango
- Producer: Joe Zawinul

Salif Keita chronology
Ko-Yan (1989)	Amen (1991)	Destiny of a Noble Outcast (1991)

Amen is the third studio album by Malian artist Salif Keita, released in 1991 by Mango Records. The album reached No. 1 on the Billboard World Albums chart.

== Overview ==
Amen was produced by Joe Zawinul.

== Critical reception ==
Professional ratings
Review scores
Source	Rating
AllMusic	4.5/5 stars
Entertainment Weekly	A

Amen was Grammy nominated in the category of Best World Music Album.

Fred Sushter of DownBeat wrote in 1992: "Amen is destined to be a world music classic, perhaps the first disc of its type to realize the potential of African sophistication and Western knowhow. It has been called the Aja of world beat, a reference to the shimmering Steely Dan album of the same name."

== Track listing ==
1. "Yele n Na"
2. "Waraya"
3. "Tono"
4. "Kuma" - Speak
5. "Nyanafi" - Nostalgia
6. "Karifa"
7. "N B'I Fe" - I love you
8. "Lony" - Knowledge

== Kuma ==
If you drop a child you can catch it, but if a word is out you cannot catch it anymore. One has to learn to speak, if you do not believe ask a lawyer. One has to learn to speak, if you do not believe this ask a griot.

== Nyanafi ==
Nyanafi means nostalgia, and the song is about the importance of life. If you think you will buy a car, if the death comes you will forget it. If you think you will buy an airplane, if the death comes you will forget it. If you see a young boy in his death clothes you will know that life is nothing. If you see a young girl in her death clothes you will know that life is nothing. If you are complaining, and you remember that image of the young boy, it will calm you down.

== Lony ==
Lony means knowledge. All depends on the knowledge to do something.
