= Other True Self =

Studio album by Vernon Reid and Masque
- Released: 2006
- Recorded: October 2005
- Studio: Gigantic Studios, New York City
- Genre: Jazz fusion, Jazz-funk
- Length: 57:17
- Label: Favored Nations; FN2550-2
- Producer: Vernon Reid

Vernon Reid chronology
Known Unknown (2004)	Other True Self (2006)

Other True Self is an album by American guitarist and Living Colour member Vernon Reid, his third as a leader. It was recorded in October 2005 at Gigantic Studios in New York City, and was released in 2006 by Favored Nations. On the album, Reid is backed by members of his band Masque: keyboard player Leon Gruenbaum, bassist Hank Schroy, and drummer Don McKenzie.

In an interview, Reid stated that one of the album's primary influences was the Mahavishnu Orchestra album The Inner Mounting Flame. He commented: "It was really raw and unlike anything else I'd heard. John McLaughlin, along with other innovators of that period like Miles Davis, Billy Cobham, and Tony Williams represent the inspiration behind Other True Self."

== Reception ==
Professional ratings
Review scores
Source	Rating
AllMusic	4/5 stars
All About Jazz	3.5/5 stars
PopMatters	5/10 stars
Slant Magazine	3.5/5 stars
The Phoenix	3/4 stars
Sea of Tranquility	4.5/5 stars

In a review for AllMusic, Sean Westergaard called the album "a great band effort led by one of guitar's unique voices, and quite an exciting musical ride," and wrote: "There are some truly wild sounds here, and careful listening... reveals even more interesting details under the surface... this is [Reid's] most eclectic solo effort to this point and goes way beyond the typical shredder mentality. It's got about as much gonzo guitar as you could ask for, but with none of the macho posturing so prevalent on so many 'guitar' albums. It's a well-crafted album, not just a platform for a series of solos."

Steve Greenlee of Jazz Times stated that the album "trades soul and emotion for volume and gimmicks... Sometimes it works; mostly it's a mess."

Writing for All About Jazz, John Kelman commented: "For those who can accept more than a little metal with their rock, ambient electronica, funk and world music, Other True Self is well worth checking out."

In an article for PopMatters, Marc A. Price wrote that Reid "offers no insight into his true self, unless this particular self is disjointed and confused and asks more questions than it answers," and remarked: "After a while, the rambunctious noodling becomes tiresome, and when you add this to the scarcity of any songs, or even tunes masquerading as songs, you find yourself wishing the whole experience was just over."

Slant Magazine's Brian Schiller described the album as "a compelling listen," and stated: "Reid comes forth on his third post-Living Colour record exploring and progressing his wide-ranging influences. The transitions from punk to metal to R&B are seamless throughout the instrumental tracks, which defies genre at every turn."

Ted Drozdowski of The Phoenix noted that on the album, Reid "establishes a comfortable balance between berserker and team player," and remarked: "It's all hot and inventive."

In a review for Sea of Tranquility, Michael Popke wrote: "If all you know of Reid's work is Living Colour's biggest hit, 'Cult of Personality,' Other True Self will make for a revealing listen. The rest of us always knew he was capable of creating an album of this caliber."

== Track listing ==
1. "Game Is Rigged" (Vernon Reid) – 5:52
2. "National Anthem" (Colin Greenwood / Jonny Greenwood / Ed O'Brien / Philip Selway / Thom Yorke) – 4:06
3. "Flatbush and Church Revisited" (Vernon Reid) – 6:15
4. "Afrerika" (Vernon Reid) – 4:11
5. "Enjoy the Silence" (Martin Gore) – 6:39
6. "Whiteface" (Leon Gruenbaum) – 3:48
7. "Oxossi" (Traditional) – 3:29
8. "G" (Vernon Reid) – 4:40
9. "Wildlife" (Tony Williams) – 4:22
10. "Overcoming" (Danny Blume / Christian Castagno / Jason Kibler / Vernon Reid) – 4:13
11. "Kizzy" (Don McKenzie) – 2:10
12. "Mind of My Mind" (Vernon Reid) – 4:12
13. "Prof. Bebey" (Vernon Reid) – 3:20

== Personnel ==
- Vernon Reid – electric guitar, electronic guitar, acoustic guitar, six string banjo
- Leon Gruenbaum – keyboards, acoustic piano, synthesizer, melodica, toy piano, glockenspiel
- Hank Schroy – electric and acoustic bass
- Don McKenzie – acoustic and electronic drums
