= Mistaken Identity (Vernon Reid album) =

Studio album by Vernon Reid
- Released: June 1996
- Genres: Instrumental rock, jazz fusion, funk, hip hop
- Length: 62:45
- Labels: Epic, 550 Music
- Producers: Vernon Reid, Prince Paul, Teo Macero

Vernon Reid chronology
Mistaken Identity (1996)	Known Unknown (2004)

Mistaken Identity is the debut solo album of American guitarist and Living Colour-member Vernon Reid, released in June 1996 on Sony Music-imprint label 550 Music. It features contributions from his backing band Masque, and was produced by Reid, hip hop producer Prince Paul, and jazz producer Teo Macero. The album's title was inspired by Reid's experience with cultural identity in his life.

== Reception ==
Professional ratings
Review scores
Source	Rating
AllMusic	4.5/5 stars
Boston Herald	3/4 stars
Robert Christgau	(2-star Honorable Mention)
Entertainment Weekly	B
Los Angeles Times	3/4 stars
Muzik	3.5/5 stars
Vibe	(favorable)

Sandy Masuo of the Los Angeles Times described the album as "more personable" than Reid's recordings with Living Colour, and wrote: "Instead of compressing the elements into a rock construct, they're allowed to glide and collide in varying configurations... Happily, it seems Reid has found himself with Mistaken Identity." Billboard's Bradley Bambarger praised the "meeting of eclectic minds" on the album, stating that it "has something for nearly everyone." He commented: "it's the surfeit of indelible melodies and crunchy textures... that could give Reid his new 'Rockit' - a rock hit for a new age."

Jacqueline Springer of Muzik called the album "an assault on the senses," featuring "the feral crashing of Reid's guitar strokes, the fervent banging of his drummer, and sheer wallop of his sagacious commentary and wry humour." Writing for Rolling Stone, David Fricke noted that Reid "is anything but mistaken in his leap of faith into fusion music," and praised the "risk, ambition and reward in full effect" on the recording. The Washington Post wrote that "Reid has lowered the volume on Identity enough to let his several attractive melodies shine through."

In a review for AllMusic, Stephen Thomas Erlewine stated that for "guitar fanatics... Mistaken Identity is well worth a listen," but remarked: "not one of the songs on the album makes an impression as a song, only as an instrumental showcase."

== Track listing ==
1. "CP Time"
2. "Mistaken Identity"
3. "You Say He's Just A Psychic Friend"
4. "Who Are You [Mutation 1]"
5. "Lightnin'"
6. "The Projects"
7. "Uptown Drifter"
8. "Saint Cobain"
9. "Important Safety Instructions! [Mutation 2]"
10. "What's My Name"
11. "Signed Fictitious"
12. "Call Waiting To Exhale [mutation 3]"
13. "My Last Nerve"
14. "Freshwater Coconut"
15. "Mysterious Power"
16. "Unborne Embrace"

== Personnel ==
- Vernon Reid – guitars both real and imagined, whispering
- Don Byron – clarinet, bass clarinet
- DJ Logic – turntables
- Leon Gruenbaum – keyboards, theremin, melodica,
- Hank Schroy – bass, fretless bass
- Curtis Watts – drums
