= Known Unknown (album) =

Studio album by Vernon Reid and Masque
- Released: 2004
- Studio: Studio 900, New York City
- Genre: Jazz fusion, Jazz-funk
- Length: 47:43
- Label: Favored Nations; FN2320-2
- Producer: Vernon Reid, Joe Johnson

Vernon Reid chronology
Mistaken Identity (1996)	Known Unknown (2004)	Other True Self (2006)

Known Unknown is an album by American guitarist and Living Colour member Vernon Reid, his second as a leader. It was recorded at Studio 900 in New York City, and was released in 2004 by Favored Nations. On the album, Reid is backed by members of his band Masque: keyboard player Leon Gruenbaum, bassist Hank Schroy, and drummer Marlon Browden. DJ Logic also appears on one track.

== Reception ==
Professional ratings
Review scores
Source	Rating
AllMusic	3.5/5 stars

In a review for AllMusic, Sean Westergaard wrote: "Reid gets some amazingly thick tones out of his guitar, and his playing sounds like no one else... Known Unknown may not reach the highs of Mistaken Identity, but it's great to hear Vernon Reid's guitar out front again on an all-instrumental album."

Dave Segal of Jazz Times stated: "The disc's unsurprisingly a showcase for Reid's flamboyant guitar heroics; his squeals and skronks call to mind Carlos Santana, John Scofield and Jimi Hendrix-all of whom merge technical mastery with soulfulness... Fuzzed-up and fluid, Reid's playing is exhibitionistic, but it doesn't overwhelm his adventurous bandmates' contributions."

Writing for All About Jazz, John Kelman commented: "With Known Unknown... Reid demonstrates one of the single largest components of his playing: organized chaos... Reid's solo style is best described as reckless abandon with a sense of purpose... Known Unknown will not be to everybody's taste; surely Reid's almost unrelenting attack on the senses will be found excessive by many; but there is a group sound, a group identity that manages to emerge here."

In an article for PopMatters, Zeth Lundy remarked: "Some of the album's delirious moments are a bit more complicated and highbrow than simply ecstatic, but that's a minor grievance. If high voltage chemistry and juicy improvisation is your bag, Reid and Masque have got the goodies to fill it."

== Track listing ==
1. "Known Unknown" (Vernon Reid) – 5:04
2. "The Slouch" (Vernon Reid) – 4:15
3. "Brilliant Corners" (Thelonious Monk) – 2:40
4. "Strange Blessing" (Vernon Reid) – 5:10
5. "Outskirts" (Vernon Reid) – 3:50
6. "Down and Out in Kigali and Freetown" (Masque) – 2:54
7. "Sidewinder" (Lee Morgan) – 2:34
8. "Voodoo Pimp Stroll" (Vernon Reid) – 6:01
9. "Time" (Vernon Reid) – 4:47
10. "Flatbush and Church" (Masque) – 3:46
11. "Ebow Underground (Excerpt)" (Vernon Reid) – 0:39
12. "X the Unknown" (Vernon Reid) – 6:03

== Personnel ==
- Vernon Reid – guitar and guitar synthesizer
- Leon Gruenbaum – organ, piano, synthesizers
- Hank Schroy – bass
- Marlon Browden – drums
- DJ Logic – turntable (track 8)
