= Gabri Christa =

Dutch performance artist

- Born: Curaçao, Dutch Caribbean
- Education: BFA; MFA in Dance
- Occupations: Performance artist, choreographer, professor, film-maker and writer
- Spouse: Vernon Reid
- Dancing career
- Former groups: Danza Contemporanea de Cuba, DanzAbierta, and the Bill T. Jones/Arnie Zane Dance Company
- Website: https://www.gabrichrista.com/

Gabri Christa is a Curacao - Dutch performance artist, choreographer, professor, film-maker and writer. She is an associate professor of Professional Practice at Barnard College and also the Director for the Movement Lab there.

Christa is a Senior Atlantic Fellow for Equity in Brain Health and received a Guggenheim Fellowship for Choreography. She is affiliated with the New York Women in Film and Television, is on the board for Dance Theatre Workshop and on the advisory board for Dance/NYC. She was also on the Cultural Affairs Advisory Commission of the City of New York, appointed by Mayor Bill de Blasio for a three-year term in 2015, until 2022.

== Early life ==
Christa was Born in Curaçao, Dutch Caribbean. She received her BFA from the School of New Dance Development, Amsterdam in 1986 and she got her MFA in Dance, with an additional study in Anthropology, Ethno-musicology and Women Studies from the University of Washington in 1998. She was born to a Surinamese father and Dutch mother.

== Career ==
Christa began her career as a performer and choreographer, with critically acclaimed work Orangemelted in the Netherlands and then started working with Danza Contemporanea de Cuba in 1987. She further went on to becoming a founding member of DanzAbierta. When she moved to New York in 1993, she started working at the Bill T. Jones/Arnie Zane Dance Company as a part of the group's eclectic repertory. Along with this, she kept up with her choreography and started her own company Danzaisa, after leaving Bill T. Jones/Arnie Zane in 1999, which went on to perform in the U.S., Europe, and Latin America.

Some of Christa's administrative positions include being the Artistic Director and Curator of Snug Harbor Cultural Center and founding and curating a Festival of the Moving Body on Screen: called Moving Body-Moving Image. From 2010 to 2014, she was the Director of Performing Arts for the Consulate General of Netherlands in New York.

A few of Christa's academic appointments as a teacher of dance and a lecturer have been at Princeton University, University of Washington and Barnard College Dance Department. She has also been on the faculty of City University of New York (CUNY) College of Staten Island in the Performing and Creative Arts department.

== Works ==
=== Stage performances ===
Christa has performed at the Symphony Space, Central Park Summer Stage, Lincoln Center Out of Doors and for five seasons at New York Live Arts. Her work, Dominata, was a multimedia piece of dance theater that used spoken word, video, dance and theatre to capture the emotions and issues surrounding immigration. Writing about it, Jennifer Dunning at The New York Times wrote that "She transforms the theater and transports you [...] she directs without seeming to lift a finger." Some of her other evening length choreographies were for the 2009 Landscape on Hold, a collaboration with Marianela Boan and Tania Isaac at the Painted Bride Art Center, Philadelphia. and Remember this moment Duet, collaboration with Niles Ford in 2008. Some of her shorter works were for Five Fingers make a hand at Staten Island Ballet, St. George Theater and Longing for what is lost in 2011 for CUNY Center for the Arts, Staten Island, NY. Her dance conduction project, Burnt Sugar Danz, later started with Greg Tate.

Magdalena is a one-woman multimedia piece which is a culmination of dance, storytelling and visuals as Christa shares personal experiences of her mother's past, her dementia, an interracial marriage, Holland during World War II and her take on motherhood. This is a series of short films which was listed as one of the "7 Dance Performances to See in N.Y.C. This Weekend" by The New York Times. Elizabeth Zimmer at The Villager described this as "A tissue of fine and funny verbal detail" with "passionate, energetic dancing", while Carrie Lee O'Dell at The Review Hub called her performance "rich and moving" and said that "we're lucky that she's generous enough to invite the audience along." According to Eva Yaa Asantewaa at Infinite Body, it is "an act of loving discovery, recall and reclamation." Fire on fire is one of the musical performances that she directed and orchestrated multimedia for. This performance brought together ten African American musicians and ten gypsy musicians in Symphony Space, New York.

=== Screen work ===
Christa has produced and directed many short films that have been screened in galleries. Her short film High School won an ABC television award for creative excellence and Pangea Day Festival's one of the World's 100 Most Promising Filmmakers award. She made the short film, Another Building, which follows the Dutch African Diaspora and highlights historic buildings in connection to the different environments where people from different cultures reside.

=== Writing ===
Christa's written publications for film and dance have been featured in The Scholar & Feminist and in "Caribbean Dance; from Abekua to Zouk". Her creative publications include "Screendance Festivals and Online Audiences" where she talked about moving the 2020 Moving Body-Moving Image Festival online, an essay called "This Little Black Doll" discussing her performance piece Magdalena and a memorial for Leo Floridas called "In Loving Memory of Leo Floridas". She published an essay in "A Life in Dance: A Practical Guide" (May 2017) called "The Wisdom Of Insecurity As a Guide To Music And Dance Collaboration".

== Awards/honors ==
- 2000 - Grant to present work internationally, United States Information Agency
- 2000 - Guggenheim Fellowship
- 2004 - Composer award collaboration / Burnt Sugar Arkestra, New York State Council on the Arts
- 2001, 2002, 2004, 2007 - Fellowship New Work, Jerome Foundation
- 2008 - Finishing Funds Award, Dance Films Association
- 2010 - Fellow, Barishnikov /Summerstages
- 2016 - Georgie Award for advocating for Culture to the Youth of Staten Island
- 2018 - Honor List Critic Eva Yaa Asantewaa for Magdalena: "Best Performances of 2018"
- 2018 - Award for Magdalena film, Netherland-America Foundation
- 2021 - Premier Grant funded through the Greater New York Arts Development Fund (GNYADF) of New York City's Department of Cultural Affairs (DCA), Staten Island Arts Council
- 2022 Presidential Research Award, Barnard College

== Filmography ==
=== Short films ===
- Ring Shout (2002)
- High School (2002)
- Domino (2003)
- Quarantine: (Another Building dancing # 1) (2007)
- Savoneta: (Another Building Dancing # 2) (2008)
- Salon Day (2010)
- Orbit-dance ScreenDance scene (2014)
- Kasita: (Another Building # 3) (2014)
- Magdalena & Herman (short) as part of Magdalena performance (2018)
- Ashe (Choreography) (2019)
- Son (2021)
- Sheila (2022)

=== Feature films ===
- Tula the Revolt (associate producer) (2013)

=== Music videos ===
- Mi Pais Director (2009)
- Universal Love (2017)

=== Documentary ===
- One Day at A Time (2016)
