= Urban Mythology Volume One =

Studio album by Free Form Funky Frēqs
- Released: 2008
- Recorded: Summer 2007
- Studios: Fenix Studios, Staten Island, New York
- Genre: Jazz-funk
- Length: 57:58
- Labels: Thirsty Ear; THI 57182
- Producer: Vernon Reid

Free Form Funky Frēqs chronology
Urban Mythology Volume One (2008)	Bon Vivant (2013)

Urban Mythology Volume One is the debut album by American experimental power trio Free Form Funky Frēqs, featuring guitarist Vernon Reid, bassist Jamaaladeen Tacuma, and drummer G. Calvin Weston. It was recorded during the summer of 2007 at Fenix Studios in Staten Island, New York, and was released in 2008 by Thirsty Ear Recordings.

The album documents the musicians' third meeting, following impromptu live sets at Tonic in New York City and Philadelphia's Tritone venue, and attempts to capture the energy and spontaneity of their live performances.

== Reception ==
Professional ratings
Review scores
Source	Rating
AllMusic	4/5 stars

In a review for AllMusic, Thom Jurek wrote: "this is a wild ride into the unconscious worlds of freakout guitar rock, funk, jazz, and 'other' music... guitar fans will be knocked out; this is one of the hippest, nastiest, most utterly electric six-string music on record... The raw wigged-out soul that this band plays with never ceases to amaze... This is a monster of a record, and if anybody gets to hear it, it will go down as one of those "classics from the underground" sets."

Writing for Jazz Times, Bill Milkowski stated that the album "is grounded by the solid hookup between Weston's pocket grooves and Tacuma's bright, bouncy electric bass lines. On top of that ultra-funky foundation, Reid basically wails with impunity using an array of outrageous tones and extravagant 21st-century effects, creating waves of swirling psychedelia and 'celestial church music' that would even make Hendrix stand in awe."

Critic Howard Mandel included the album in his list of "2008's Top Recordings," and remarked: "Play it loud."

A reviewer for Improvijazzation Nation described the album as "HEAVY!", calling it "MOST HIGHLY RECOMMENDED," and stated: "You've probably not heard 'funk' like this before... you're in the presence of the players of tomorrow's music – they just got here a little early!"

== Track listing ==
All music composed by Vernon Reid, Jamaaladeen Tacuma, and G. Calvin Weston.

1. "A Tale Of Two Bridges" – 11:57
2. "Don Cheadle" – 5:26
3. "Ghost Sign Crossroad" – 7:07
4. "Over and Under" – 3:52
5. "A Lost Way Found" – 6:26
6. "Happy Hour" – 4:17
7. "Chump Champ Chunk" – 5:05
8. "Get Your Legs On" – 4:25
9. "Doing Within" – 4:44
10. "Street Corner Prophecy" – 4:39

== Personnel ==
- Vernon Reid – guitar, guitar synthesizer, laptop
- Jamaaladeen Tacuma – bass
- G. Calvin Weston – drums
