= The Tao of Yo =

Studio album by The Yohimbe Brothers (Vernon Reid and DJ Logic)
- Released: 2004
- Genre: Electronic, hip hop
- Length: 44:36
- Label: Thirsty Ear; THI57149.2
- Producer: GoodandEvil

The Yohimbe Brothers chronology
Front End Lifter (2002)	The Tao of Yo (2004)

The Tao of Yo is an album by the Yohimbe Brothers, featuring guitarist Vernon Reid and turntablist DJ Logic. It was released in 2004 by Thirsty Ear Recordings.

== Reception ==
Professional ratings
Review scores
Source	Rating
AllMusic	4/5 stars
DownBeat	3.5/5 stars
Robert Christgau	A−
All About Jazz	4.5/5 stars
All About Jazz	3/5 stars

In a review for AllMusic, Sean Westergaard called the album a "genre-smashing effort," and wrote: "There's way more detail to these tracks than could possibly be picked up on an initial listening, making this album a pleasure to come back to."

DownBeat's Jennifer Odell stated: "Reid and Logic have finally seasoned the symbiosis between turntablism and rock guitar that they began forging two decades ago. Underscored by that relationship, the political messages about unity and equality sound stronger than ever."

Author Robert Christgau awarded the album an "A−", noting that it "has that aura of the forbidden."

Mark F. Turner of All About Jazz commented: "While not for everyone's taste, this herbal mix of music is potent; the Yohimbe Brothers continue to produce sounds that defy genres and combine the best of many elements into a most noteworthy package." AAJ's Andrew Durkin remarked: "The Yohimbe Brothers do what they do, and they do it well. We should all be so lucky."

In a year-end recap for The Washington Post, Curt Fields stated: "this duo doesn't blend styles so much as purees them into a tasty shake of blistering rock riffs, African rhythms, rap, jazz and Latin beats. Add a helping of socially conscious lyrics on the side and it's a musical meal that gets better with every serving."

Writing for Glide Magazine, Chad Berndtson commented: "Yo spends too much time mashing... already brainy science projects together, rendering them big, messy piles of disparate ideas, instead of the transcendent, out-of-the-box grooves the listener hopes for."

Exposé Online's Jeff Melton described the album as "a brainy concoction that Logic and Reid have made for fans of who don't mind pushing their boundaries a little in the NY downtown scene."

David Dacks of Exclaim! remarked: "Logic and production duo Good and Evil heighten the proceedings with interesting grooves, featuring large helpings of go-go... and outernational rhythms. Throughout the disc, Reid's metalloid guitar is well mixed and deployed and affixed to relevant songwriting ideas."

== Track listing ==
1. "Shine For Me" – 3:28
2. "The Secret Frequency" – 3:58
3. "More From Life" – 4:19
4. "Shape 4" – 0:49
5. "Noh Rio" – 4:14
6. "TV" – 3:49
7. "30 Spokes" – 1:57
8. "Unimportance" – 2:44
9. "No Pistolas" – 3:59
10. "Overcoming" – 4:29
11. "Words They Choose" – 3:26
12. "Shape I" – 2:05
13. "Perfect Traveller (Tourist Europe)" – 5:19

== Personnel ==
- Vernon Reid – acoustic guitar, electric guitar, guitar synthesizer
- DJ Logic – sound effects, turntables
- Latasha Nevada Diggs – vocals
- Taylor McFerrin – vocals
- Bos Omega – vocals
- Ricky Quinnones – vocals
- Shantyman – spoken vocals
- Goodandevil – misc. instruments, programming
- Jared Nickerson – bass guitar
- Eddie Hall – congas, bongos, dumbek, percussion
- Maya Jenkins – tap dancer
