= Soro (album) =

Studio album by Salif Keita
- Released: December 14, 1987
- Studio: Studio Harry Son
- Genre: Afro-pop
- Length: 37:45
- Language: malinké
- Label: Mango
- Producer: Ibrahima Sylla (executive producer), Francois Breant

Salif Keita chronology
Soro (1987)	Ko-Yan (1989)

Professional ratings
Review scores
Source	Rating
AllMusic	4.5/5 stars
The Village Voice	B

Soro is the 1987 debut album by Malian Afro-pop artist Salif Keita. The album marks the music of his first period. It was executive produced by Ibrahima Sylla.

== Track listing ==
1. “Wamba” (Keita) – 4:46
2. “Soro (Afrika)” (Keita) – 9:52
3. “Souareba” (Keita) – 4:39
4. “Sina (Soumbouya)” (Keita) – 4:45
5. “Cono” (Keita) – 6:00
6. “Sagni Kegniba” (Keita) – 7:44

== Sina ==
Keita sings "Sina" for his father who never wanted him to become a singer. Traditionally the caste of griots sing, not a Keita who belongs to the caste of princes, a descendant of Sundiata Keita.
