= Deanna Kirk =

American jazz musician

Deanna Kirk is an American jazz singer and songwriter based in New York City. She is known for owning Deanna's, a jazz club in downtown Manhattan, and for her songwriting contributions to film and television soundtracks. Kirk's musical style blends elements of jazz and art-rock, and she has gained recognition for her lyrical depth.

== Career ==
=== Music ===
Kirk is recognized as a jazz cabaret singer and songwriter, described as "really an art-rock diva" in the tradition of Tori Amos and Sarah McLaughlan, sometimes performing under the alter ego "Marianna". Her lyrics are noted for their "romantically philosophical" themes. Her live album, Live at Deanna's, was initially intended for exclusive sale at her nightclub but was later released nationally by Atlantic Records. This release helped secure her a contract with Blackbird Recording Company. Kirk's debut album with Blackbird, Mariana Trench (1996), featured original songs alongside covers of works by Leonard Cohen and Sandy Denny. Her second studio album, Where Are You Now? (1997), released by Blackbird/Elektra, included the track You're a Mean One, Mr. Grinch.. Kirk is depicted performing at the Nuyorican Poets Café in Larry Closs’s 2011 novel Beatitude, in a mid-1990s East Village scene.

Kirk gained significant media attention, being featured on the front page of Billboard as the flagship artist of Blackbird Recording Company. She has also been covered by People, The New York Times, Time Out, and New York Magazine.

=== Nightclub Ownership ===
In the mid-1990s Kirk opened Deanna's, a "popular East Village hole-in-the-wall jazz club" on East 7th Street, where she performed standards. After a fire destroyed the club she reopened a more upscale Deanna's on Rivington Street on the Lower East Side. The club's history and the fire that destroyed the East Village location is recounted in Ballad of the Small Cafe, on Kirk's album, Where Are You Now.

=== Film and Television Work ===
She signed a publishing deal with Bug Music and began to write and record for film and television soundtracks. Her music has been featured in the television shows as Felicity and Hyperion Bay and on the movie soundtracks Down to You (2000) and Me Myself I (2000). She toured North America with Jane Siberry, has toured internationally, was the house chanteuse at her club Deanna's, and regularly performs at clubs including Smalls and LaMama with the Deanna Kirk Quintet in New York City.

=== Personal life ===
Kirk, a concert-level pianist, was born in Manhattan and grew up in Freeport, Long Island. She had decided to interrupt her career as a jazz singer to take care of her son and is performing regularly again.

== Discography ==
- Live at Deanna's (Atlantic, 1994)
- Marianna Trench (Blackbird, 1996)
- Where Are You Now? (Blackbird, 1997)
- Beautyway (Deanna Kirk, 2002)
- Lost in Languid Love Songs (Deanna Kirk, 2013)
