= Ko-Yan =

Studio album by Salif Keita
- Released: 1989
- Recorded: 1989
- Genre: Malian music
- Length: 42:07
- Language: Malinké
- Label: Mango
- Producer: François Breant

Salif Keita chronology
Soro (1987)	Ko-Yan (1989)	Amen (1991)

Ko-Yan is an album by the Malian musician Salif Keita. It was released in 1989 by Mango Records. It was recorded in Paris.

The album contains more influence from Western music, while still maintaining a traditional style. All the songs were written by Keita, including "Nou Pas Bouger", one of his first hits.

== Critical reception ==
Professional ratings
Review scores
Source	Rating
Hi-Fi News & Record Review	A*:1

The New York Times wrote: "Synthesizers and Western horns perk along (sometimes sounding like Weather Report on Ko-Yan), but the underlying rhythms percolate in triple time, and it's hard for a Western ear to predict where Mr. Keita's vocal lines, and the responses of his female backup singers, will begin or end." The Edmonton Journal noted that Keita's music "injects the stirring traditional rhythms of Mali with nourishing contemporary textures—funk, soca, and soul."

== Track listing ==
1. "Yada"
2. "Nou Pas Bouger"
3. "Ko-Yan"
4. "Fe-So"
5. "Primpin"
6. "Tenin"
7. "Sabou"
