= Un Autre Blanc =

Studio album by Salif Keita
- Released: October 26, 2018
- Length: 54:32
- Language: Malinké
- Label: Naïve

Salif Keita chronology
Talé (2013)	Un Autre Blanc (2018)	So Kono (2025)

Professional ratings
Aggregate scores
Source	Rating
Metacritic	80/100
Review scores
Source	Rating
Exclaim!	8/10
PopMatters	7/10

Un Autre Blanc is a studio album by Malian singer-songwriter Salif Keita. It was released in October 2018 under Naïve Records.

== Track listing ==
No.	Title	Length
1.	"Were Were"	4:54
2.	"Syrie"	5:04
3.	"Tonton"	3:43
4.	"Itarafo" (featuring Angélique Kidjo and MHD)	4:45
5.	"Diawara Fa" (featuring Yemi Alade)	5:59
6.	"Bah Poulo"	5:38
7.	"Tiranke"	6:38
8.	"Lerou Lerou"	5:00
9.	"Gnamale" (featuring Ladysmith Black Mambazo)	6:08
10.	"Mansa Fo La" (featuring Alpha Blondy)	6:43
