= World Circuit =

World Circuit may refer to:

- World Circuit (record label)
- Formula One Grand Prix (video game), known as World Circuit in the US
