= Folon (album) =

Studio album by Salif Keita
- Released: 1995
- Recorded: 1995
- Genres: World music, dance
- Length: 56:19
- Language: Malinké
- Label: Mango
- Producers: Wally Badarou, Jean-Philippe Rykiel

Salif Keita chronology
Destiny of a Noble Outcast (1991)	Folon (1995)	Rail Band (1996)

Folon is an album by the Malian artist Salif Keita. It was released in 1995 by Mango Records.

== Production ==
The album was produced primarily by Wally Badarou. "Mandjou" is a remake of one of Keita's 1970s hits. "Seydou" is a tribute to Chris Seydou.

== Critical reception ==
Professional ratings
Review scores
Source	Rating
AllMusic	4/5 stars
Robert Christgau	(2-star Honorable Mention)

Rolling Stone wrote that "once he has filled the crossover quota ... Keita offers solemn, languid, march-tempo meditations ('Mandjou', 'Mandela', 'Nyanyama') that are hauntingly beautiful and deceptively sophisticated." The Guardian determined that "though more dancey in drum and bass than ever the albino activist's disenchantment with European life is evident, warmly expressed in an increasingly pan-African view."

AllMusic praised the "gritty voice that transcends classification," writing that Keita "spins dance tracks that reveal a dedication to tradition and passion."

== Track listing ==
All songs written by Salif Keita.

1. "Tekere" 6:33
2. "Mandjou" 10:37
3. "Africa" 5:59
4. "Nyanyama" 6:18
5. "Mandela" 4:30
6. "Sumun" 6:57
7. "Seydou" 5:48
8. "Dakan-Fe" 5:06
9. "Folon" 4:25

== Personnel ==
- Salif Keita: Vocals
- Angeline Annonier, Nayanka Bell, Djanka Diabate, Djene Doumbouya, Mora Birbeck, Bessy Gordon: Vocal Backing
- Ousmane Kouyate: Guitars
- Wally Badarou: Keyboards, Vocal Backing
- Check Tidiane Seck: Keyboards
- Mohktar Samba: Drums
- Souleymane Doumbouya, Sydney Thiam: Percussion
