= Front End Lifter =

Studio album by The Yohimbe Brothers (Vernon Reid and DJ Logic)
- Released: 2002
- Studio: DharmaLab, Shaolin, New York
- Genre: Electronic, hip hop
- Length: 56:14
- Label: Ropeadope; 0-7567-93136-2-1
- Producer: DJ Logic, Vernon Reid

The Yohimbe Brothers chronology
Front End Lifter (2002)	The Tao of Yo (2004)

Front End Lifter is an album by the Yohimbe Brothers, featuring guitarist Vernon Reid and turntablist DJ Logic. It was recorded at DharmaLab, Reid's home studio in Staten Island, New York, and was released in 2002 by Ropeadope Records. On the album, Reid and Logic are joined by seventeen guest musicians.

== Reception ==
Professional ratings
Review scores
Source	Rating
AllMusic	4.5/5 stars
Robert Christgau	A−
Dean Budnick	4/5 stars

In a review for AllMusic, Jason Birchmeier wrote: "Though you get the sense that Front End Lifter is simply a good-time side project... the resulting album is so staggering you really wish the duo would get together more often... the guitarist and turntablist showcase remarkable creativity, offering much more than the expected... the two compose what very well could be thought of as sound collages or free jazz-style illbience."

Terry Sawyer of PopMatters called the recording "an album equal parts party and perspiration," and stated: "As an album, the cohesion of Front End Lifter works the way a good friend's mix tape would, through a seamless well-culled breadth."

Robert Christgau commented: "The Yohimbes' groove never falls beneath the standard of good drum'n'bass/trip-hop/whatchamacallit, and often rises well above it."

Author Dean Budnick called the album "a dazzling if overwhelming mosaic of styles and sounds."

Writing for Dusted Magazine, Mason Jones remarked: "This sort of genetic experimentation doesn't always work, of course, but when it does the relative newness can be refreshing; such is the case here. Instead of awkwardly marrying the worst of hip-hop and metal, as seems to be the trendy thing nowadays, these two take much of the best from numerous genres, and blend them into songs which are, for the most part, wholly successful... The results are... alternately fun, affecting, and exciting."

A writer for Billboard stated: "Reid and Logic have crafted/produced an inspired, multi-faceted album that, at times, is both surreal and comical."

Jesse Jarnow of Jambands.com wrote: "A lot of the time, it's a bit hard to tell what noise is coming from which musician... This is when the music is at its best. In other places, it's stunningly obvious."

== Track listing ==
1. "Ponk" – 2:54
2. "Tenemental" – 4:02
3. "6996-Club-Yohimbe" – 4:43
4. "Psychopathia Mojosexualis" – 2:58
5. "Welcome 2 the Freq Show" – 4:09
6. "$moke and Dust Dub (Version)" – 1:34
7. "The Big Pill" – 3:46
8. "Bamalamb" – 4:15
9. "Transmission XXX" – 3:22
10. "Just a Little Screwy" – 1:44
11. "Invitation to a Situation" – 4:42
12. "Prelude To A Diss" – 4:41
13. "Innerspin (A Tone Hymn)" – 2:07
14. "The Callipygiac Caldonians" – 4:10
15. "That Obscure Object of Desire" – 6:07

== Personnel ==
- Vernon Reid – guitar, effects
- DJ Logic – turntables, scratches, sampler, sounds
- Hank Schroy – bass (tracks 1, 9, 12, and 14)
- Yuval Gabay – drums (tracks 1 and 15)
- Kevin Webb – vocals (track 3)
- Rod Bowen – vocals (track 3)
- Latasha Nevada Diggs – vocals (track 4)
- Doug Wimbish – bass (tracks 5, 7, and 11)
- Eddie Hall – percussion (tracks 7 and 12)
- Mark Durham – percussion (track 7)
- Val – talking drum (track 7)
- Wunmi Olaiya – vocals (track 7)
- David Barnes – harmonica (track 8)
- Maz Swift – violin (tracks 8 and 15)
- Leon Gruenbaum – keyboards, electronics (tracks 11, 13, and 15)
- Micah Gaugh – saxophone (track 11)
- Elisa Burchett – vocals (track 11)
- Will Calhoun – drums (track 12)
- Jimmy Lee – baglama (track 14)
