= DJ Logic =

American turntablist (born 1972)

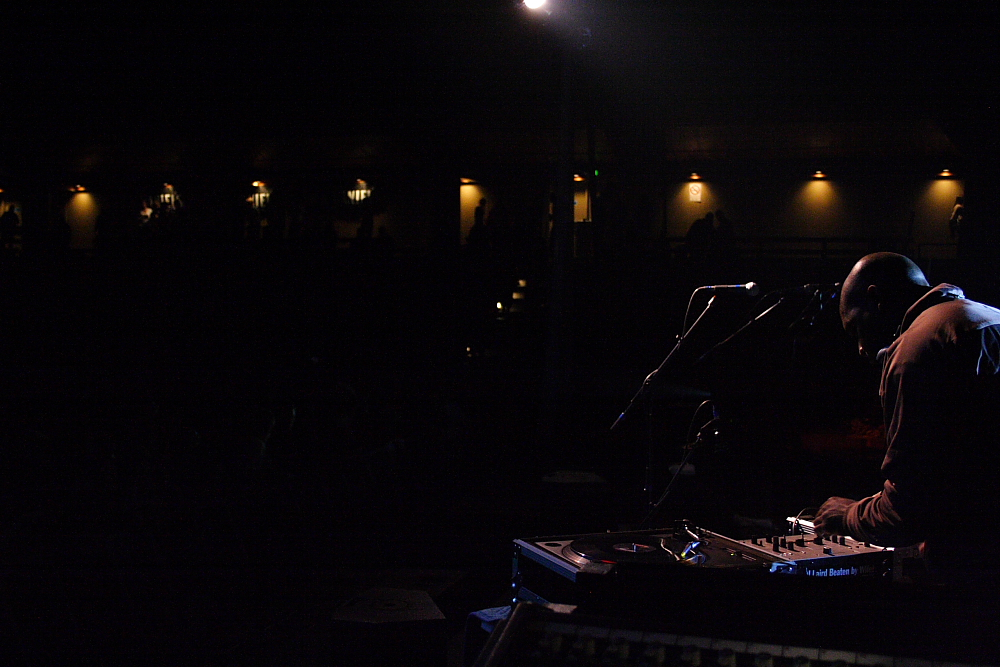
- DJ Logic performing at Vail Snow Daze, 2008

Background information
- Born: Lee Jason Kibler; 1972 (age 53–54); The Bronx, New York, United States
- Genres: Hip-hop, nu-jazz, acid jazz, jam band
- Occupations: DJ, turntablist
- Instrument: Turntables
- Years active: 1990–present
- Labels: Ropeadope, Relix
- Website: DJLogic.com

DJ Logic (born Lee Jason Kibler, 1972) is an American DJ primarily known for his work in nu-jazz, acid-jazz, and with jam bands.

== Life and career ==
Born and raised in The Bronx, New York, Kibler displayed an early interest in hip hop, funk, and jazz music. He began practicing on the turntables and collaborating with various musicians, creating recordings best described as a contemporary soul jazz with a string hip hop feel.

Kibler often tours with his own group, Project Logic, and has recorded or performed with Vernon Reid, moe., John Mayer, Medeski Martin & Wood, Bob Belden, Jack Johnson, Chris Whitley, Uri Caine, Christian McBride and others.

On September 10, 2001, Project Logic performed the final official show at Wetlands Preserve before the closing of the venue, featuring special guests Warren Haynes of The Allman Brothers Band and Gov't Mule, Stanley Jordan and Mike Gordon.

On April 6, 2006, Kibler sat in with Bob Weir's RatDog, adding his style to the famous Grateful Dead song combo "China Cat Sunflower/I Know You Rider." He is a founding member of The John Popper Project. On August 15, 2009, Kibler sat in with O.A.R. at Madison Square Garden, adding his style to their latest single, "This Town".

Kibler has often cited his mentor as Vernon Reid. The duo have recorded and toured as the Yohimbe Brothers with various guests, and Kibler has appeared on studio and live performances on Reid's solo projects. Reid also performed a guest solo for Kibler's original Band Eye and I, which featured D.K. Dyson and Melvin Gibbs, who has played on all of Kibler's solo releases.

== Discography ==
=== Rise and Shine Remixes (2011) ===
Sierra Leone's Refugee All Stars Meet DJ Logic

Released by Combacha

Track list

1. Muloma Remix
2. Jah Come Down Remix
3. Jah Mercy Remix
4. Global Threat Remix
5. But Vange Remix

=== Zen of Logic (2006) ===
DJ Logic

Released by Ropeadope Records

Track list

1. Peace Y'All (I am in the House)
2. 9th Ward Blues
3. Balifon Planet
4. Hypnotic
5. Interlude #1
6. Simmer Slow
7. Afro Beat
8. One Time
9. Something Distant
10. Hope Road
11. Smackness
12. Interlude #2
13. Rat Pack
14. Holding Down

=== The John Popper Project (2004) ===
The John Popper Project

Released by Relix Records

Track list

1. Lapdance
2. Everything
3. All Good Children
4. In The Midst
5. Fire In Her Kiss
6. Louisiana Sky
7. Trigger
8. Horses
9. Took
10. Morning Light
11. Open Hand
12. Show Me
13. Pack Your Love

=== Longitude (2004) ===
Groundtruther

Released by Thirsty Ear Recordings

Track list

1. Transit of Venus
2. Tycho Brahe
3. March 1741, Cape Horn
4. Course Made Good
5. Dead Reckoning
6. Medicean Stars
7. Jupiter Mask
8. H-4
9. Back Quadrant
10. Epherimedes
11. Prime Meridian
12. South Heading

=== The Tao of Yo (2004) ===
Yohimbe Brothers

Released by Thirsty Ear Recordings

Track list

1. Shine For Me
2. The Secret Frequency
3. More From Life
4. Shape 4
5. Noh Rio
6. TV
7. 30 Spokes
8. Unimportance
9. No Pistolas
10. Overcoming
11. Words They Use
12. Shape 1
13. Perfect Traveller

=== Front End Lifter (2002) ===
Yohimbe Brothers

Released by Ropeadope Records

Track list

1. Ponk
2. Tenemental
3. 6996-Club-Vohimbe
4. Psychopathia Mojosexualis
5. Welcome 2 The Freq Show
6. Smoke and Dust Dub Version
7. The Big Pill
8. Bamalamb
9. Transmission XXX
10. Just A Little Screwy
11. Invitation To A Situation
12. Prelude To A Diss
13. Innerspin (A Tone Hymn)
14. The Callipygiac Caldonians
15. That Obscure Object of Desire

=== The Anomaly (2001) ===
DJ Logic

Released by Ropeadope Records

Track list

1. French Quarter
2. Black Buddah
3. Ron’s House
4. Michelle
5. Frequency One
6. Tih Gnob
7. Bean-E-Man
8. Who Am I?
9. Soul-Kissing
10. Afronautical
11. The Project(s)
12. Hip-Hopera
13. An Interlude
14. Miles Away
15. Drone

=== Project Logic (1999) ===
DJ Logic

Released by Ropeadope Records

Track list

1. Intro
2. Shea’s Groove
3. Abyss
4. Eyes Open (But Dead)
5. Mnemonics
6. Interlude 1
7. Flat As Aboard
8. Gig 1
9. Interlude 2
10. Una Cosa Buena
11. Bag of Tricks
12. J.J. Bailey
13. Two Different Places
14. Spider Dance
15. Interlude 3
16. Bruckner Boulevard
17. Kinda Bleu

=== Appearances ===
With Wallace Roney

- Prototype (HighNote, 2004)

With Christian McBride

- Live at Tonic (Ropeadope, 2006)
