= Salif Keita =

Malian singer-songwriter (born 1949)

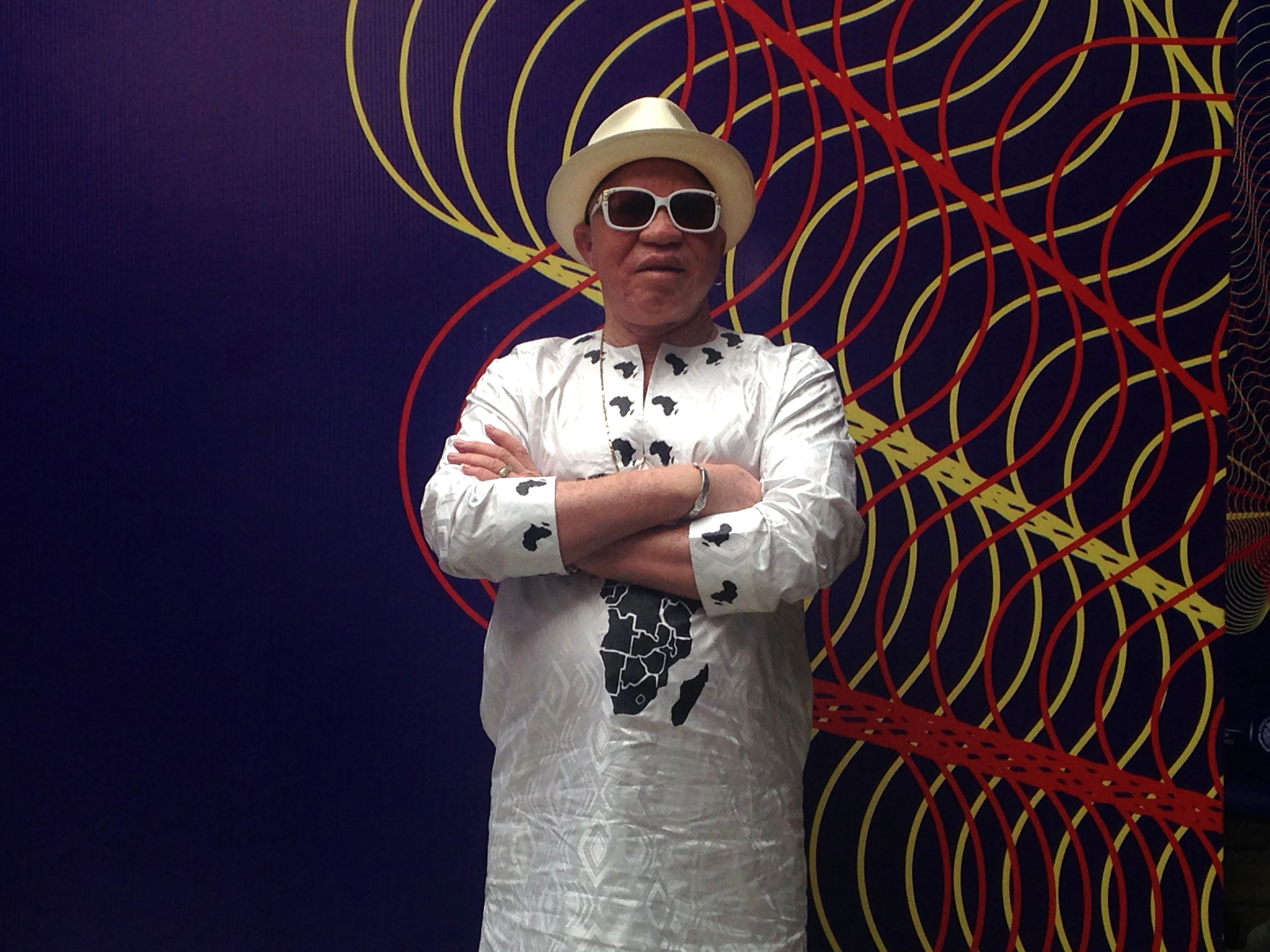
- Keita in 2015

Background information
- Also known as: The Golden Voice of Africa
- Born: 25 August 1949 (age 77)
- Origin: Djoliba, Mali
- Genres: African; Afro-pop; Malian; West African; world; worldbeat
- Occupation: Singer
- Years active: Mid-1970s–2018; 2025

Salif Keïta (IPA: [salif keita]) (born 25 August 1949) is a Malian singer-songwriter, referred to as the "Golden Voice of Africa". He is a member of the Keita royal family of Mali.

== Early life ==
Salif Keita was born a traditional prince in the village of Djoliba. He was born to the Keita royal family, who trace their lineage to Sundiata Keita, founder of the Mali Empire. He was cast out by his family and ostracized by the community because of his albinism, a sign of bad luck in Mandinka culture. Raised in a Muslim family, he went to an Islamic school where he was influenced by his Qur'an teacher's singing. He decided to pursue music in his teenage years, further distancing him from his family as that was against occupational prohibitions of his noble status.

In 1967, he left Djoliba for Bamako, where he joined the government-sponsored Super Rail Band de Bamako. In 1973, Keita joined the group Les Ambassadeurs (du Motel de Bamako). Keita and Les Ambassadeurs fled political unrest in Mali during the mid-1970s and subsequently changed the group's name to Les Ambassadeurs Internationaux. The reputation of this band grew internationally in the late-1970s, leading to Keita pursuing a solo career in the following years.

He is the father of paralympian athlete Nantenin Keita.

== Career ==
Due to political unrest, Keita and his band-mates fled Mali in the mid-1970s. They settled in Abidjan, Ivory Coast, where they struggled financially and often had to rent equipment to perform shows. The band (now named Les Ambassadeurs Internationaux) steadily grew in popularity in the ensuing years. Their 1978 album, Mandjou, became an overnight success in West Africa.

In 1976, Sékou Touré, the President of Guinea, made Keita an Officer of Guinea's National Order of Merit. The President had been a fan of Keita and the band's since they met at an official visit in 1974. Touré had remained a fan and supporter even after they fled Mali. Wanting to reciprocate the honour, Keita composed the track "Mandjou" (featured on the eponymous 1978 album) as a praise song for Touré. However, by the time the song was released, Touré had completely resorted to authoritarian rule and plunged his country into bloodshed and chaos. Keita still performs rearranged versions of "Mandjou".

Keita moved to Paris, France, in 1984 to reach a larger audience and to pursue a solo career. His music combined traditional West African music styles with influences from both Europe and the Americas.

At that time, Keita was famous in Africa and had a strong fan base among connoisseurs around the world. Soro became his international-breakthrough album in 1987. The project was produced by Ibrahima Sylla, a visionary who had already discovered dozens of African stars (and would later become the driving force behind Africando). The arrangements featured roiling rhythms, slightly nasal female backup choirs, and traditional percussion typical of Malian music.

Musical instruments that are commonly featured in Keita's work include balafons, djembes, guitars, koras, organs, saxophones, and synthesizers. He performed at the Nelson Mandela 70th Birthday Tribute concert in 1988 to call for Nelson Mandela's release from prison. In 1990, Keita contributed "Begin the Beguine" to the Cole Porter tribute/AIDS benefit album Red Hot + Blue, produced by the Red Hot Organization.

Keita found success in Europe as one of the African stars of world music, but his work was sometimes criticised for the gloss of its production and for the occasional haphazard quality. However, shortly after the turn of the millennium he returned to Bamako in Mali to live and record. His first work after going home, 2002's Moffou, was hailed as his best album in many years, and Keita was inspired to build a recording studio in Bamako, which he used for his album M'Bemba, released in October 2005.

Guest artists on his albums have included Weather Report founders Joe Zawinul and Wayne Shorter, drummer Paco Sery, guitarist Carlos Santana, and percussionist Bill Summers.

Keita's album La Différence was produced around the end of 2009. The work is dedicated to the struggle of the world albino community (victims of human sacrifice), for which Keita has been crusading all his life. In one of the album's tracks, the singer calls others to understand that "difference" does not mean "bad" and to show love and compassion towards albinos like everyone else: "I am black/ my skin is white/ so I am white and my blood is black [albino]/...I love that because it is a difference that's beautiful", "some of us are beautiful some are not/some are black some are white/all that difference was on purpose...for us to complete each other/let everyone get his love and dignity/the world will be beautiful."

La Différence was recorded between Bamako, Beirut, Paris, and Los Angeles. This unique musical feel is reinforced by soulful pitches in the track "Samigna" emanating from the trumpet of the great Lebanese jazzman Ibrahim Maalouf.

In 2001, Keita's song "Tomorrow" was featured in the Will Smith film Ali.

La Différence won Keita one of the biggest musical awards of his career: the Best World Music 2010 at the Victoires de la musique.

In 2013, after what he described as "threats" from the Boycott, Divestment and Sanctions (BDS) campaign, he cancelled a performance in Israel. He later published a letter on his Facebook page, stating that he decided to cancel the event because he was scared of "being harmed personally or professionally", but clarified that he still "love[d] Israel", slamming BDS as an "extremist group" who used "scare tactics and bullying".

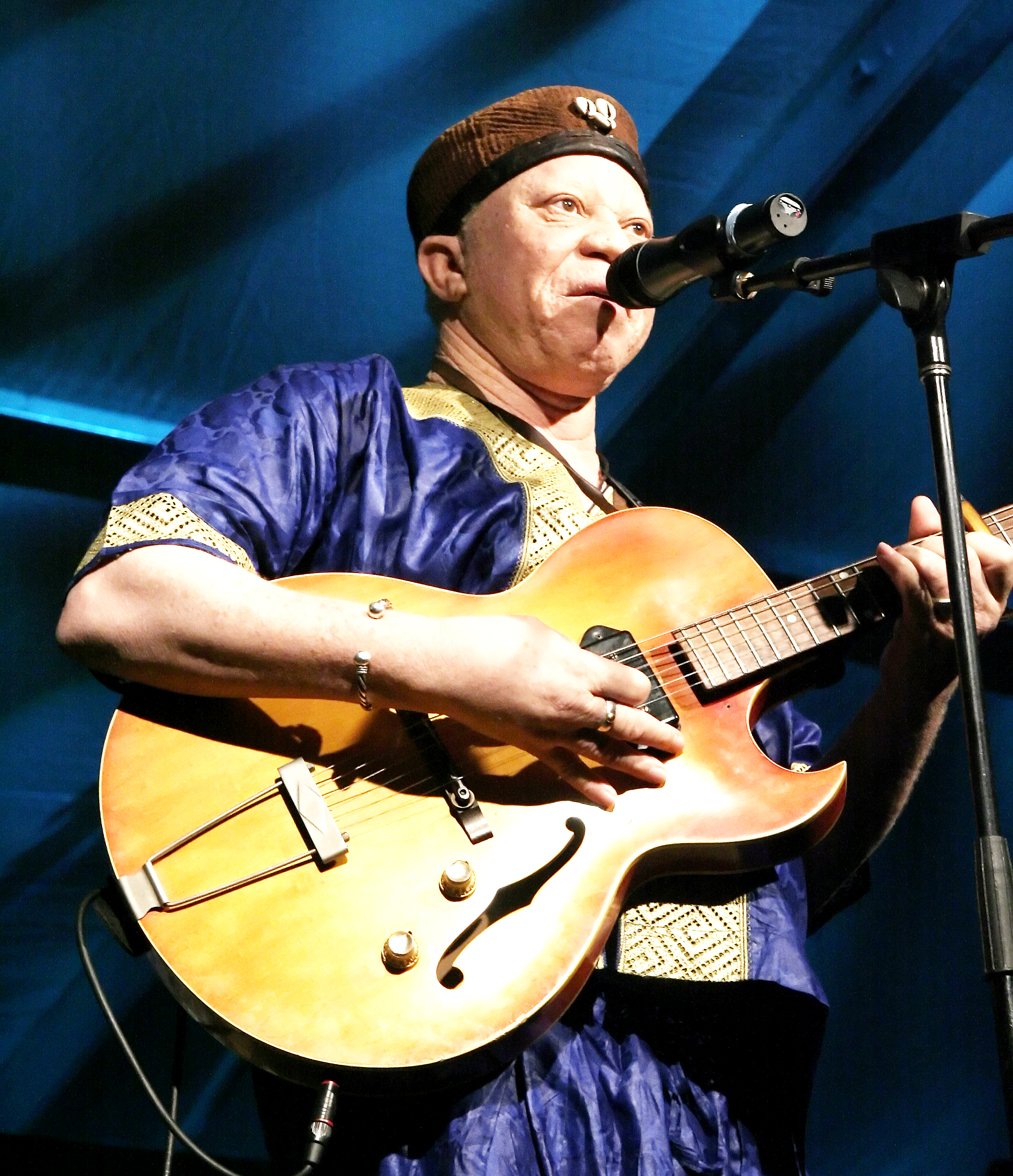
Photo of Salif Keïta

In November 2018, Keita announced his retirement from recording at a concert in Fana, Mali. The album Un Autre Blanc, which was released at the concert, would be his last. For his farewell recording he invited a rich cast of African singers to help him on one of his songs called "Gnamale". At the end of the album he thanked God for blessing him and warning people who would misuse his name.

He uses traditional African instruments such as the djembe, kora and balafon which are quite prevalent in his sound. He has also been able to sing to non-traditional instrumentation. He has more than 15 albums and Keita counts Un Autre Blanc as his swan song.

He was to act as legislative body from 2020 till his resignation of 31 July 2023.

In August 2023, Keïta was appointed adviser to the head of the junta by Colonel Assimi Goïta.

In April 2025, Keita came out of retirement to release So Kono, his first album in seven years. The record is characterized by an unusually sparse sound, featuring guitar, ngoni, calabash, tama, and cello.

== Albinism ==
A descendant of the founder of the Mali Empire, Salif Keïta was born albino. He faced significant challenges in his native land of Mali, particularly among the Mandinka people, where his condition was regarded as an illness. Despite being part of a lineage of musicians, he was prohibited from pursuing music owing to his royal lineage. When he decided to pursue music in his teenage years, it resulting in his disownment by his father and expulsion from school as his father stopped paying for his education. Seeking acceptance, he relocated to Ivory Coast in his youth, where he focused on his passion for music. He ultimately became recognized as a cultural icon. In 1997, he returned to Mali after achieving fame, but did not attempt to contact his family.

== Selected discography ==
=== As primary artist ===
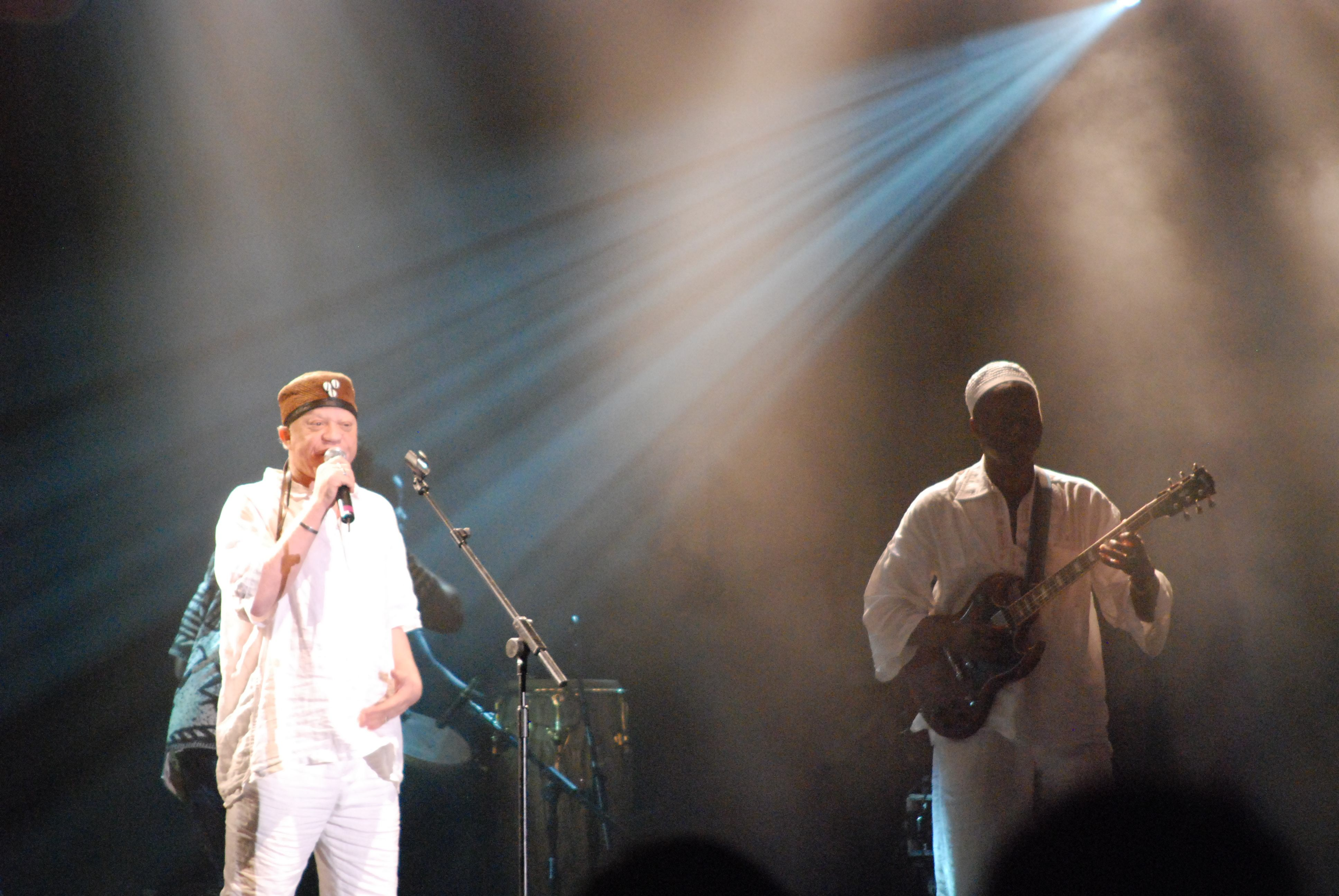
Keita at WOMAD Charlton Park, England, 2010

- Seydou Bathili (1982)
- Soro (Mango, 1987)
- Ko-Yan (Mango, 1989)
- Amen (Mango, 1991)
- Destiny of a Noble Outcast (PolyGram, 1991)
- 69–80 (Sonodisc, 1994)
- Folon (Mango, 1995)
- Seydou Bathili (Sonodisc, 1997)
- Papa (Metro Blue, 1999)
- Mama (Capitol, 2000)
- Sosie (Mellemfolkeligt, 2001)
- Moffou (Universal Jazz France, 2002)
- Remixes from Moffou (Universal Jazz France, 2004)
- M'Bemba (Universal Jazz France, 2005)
- The Lost Album (Cantos, 1980) – reissued 2005
- La Différence (Emarcy, 2009)
- Talé (Emarcy, 2012)
- Un Autre Blanc (Naïve, 2018)
- So Kono (No Format!, 2025)
- Madan (with Jonas Blue, 2026)

Many compilations are available as well, including:

- The Mansa of Mali...a Retrospective – 1994
- Rail Band – 1996 – Melodie
- The Best of Salif Keita – 2001 – Wrasse Records
- Salif Keita: The Best of the Early Years – 2002 – Wrasse Records

=== As sideman ===
- Ambassadeur International, Mandjou (Amons, 1978)

=== Singles ===
- "Yamore" (2002) (with Cesária Évora)

== Music videos ==
Year	Video
2002	"Yamore" (with Cesaria Evora)
