= Walter Trout discography =

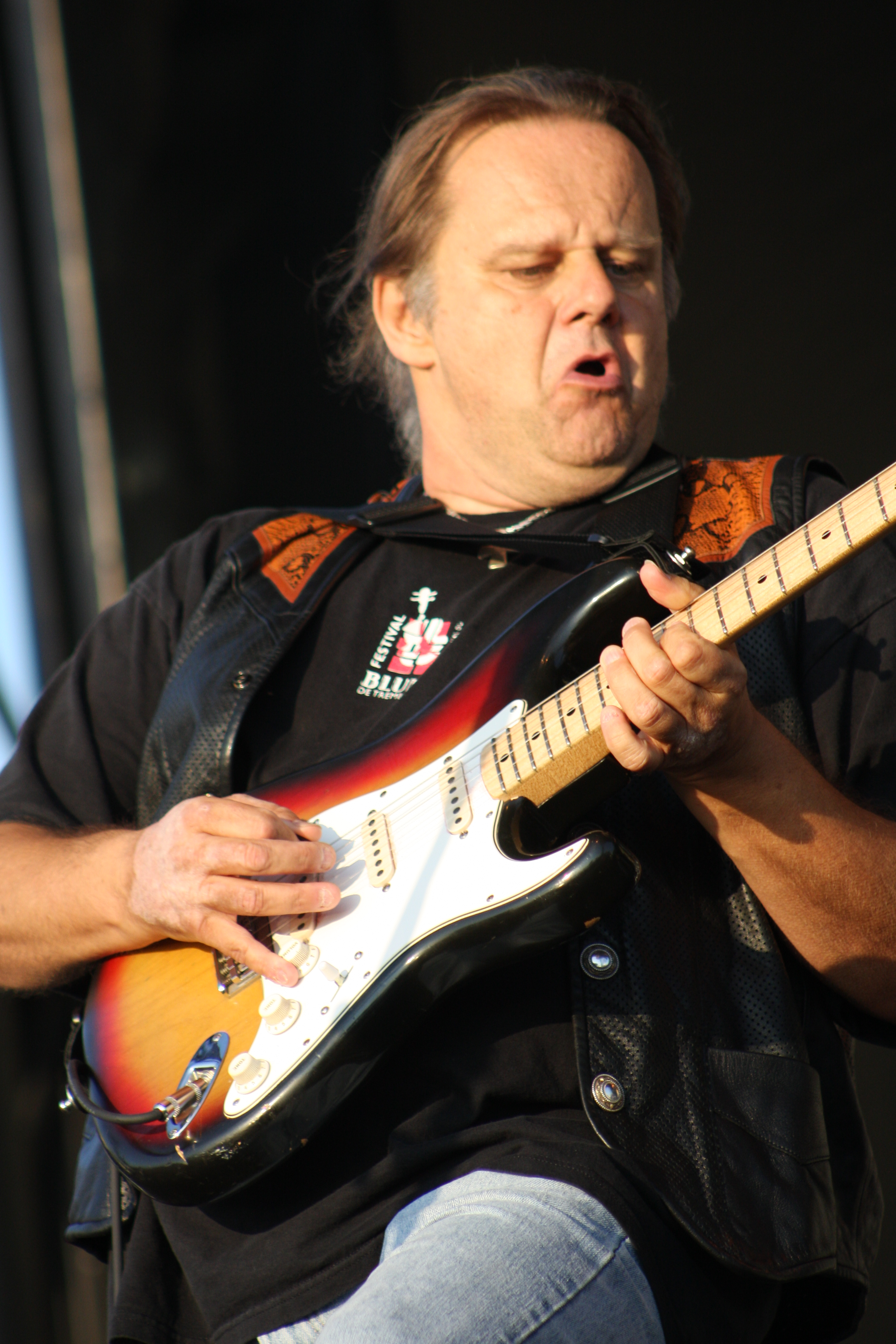
- Trout performing in 2008
- Studio albums: 21
- EPs: 1
- Live albums: 6
- Compilation albums: 2
- Singles: 22
- Video albums: 1

Walter Trout is an American blues rock musician from Ocean City, New Jersey. After spells in Canned Heat and John Mayall & the Bluesbreakers in the 1980s, he started a solo career in 1989 and signed to Dutch label Provogue Records. His first three albums – Life in the Jungle, Prisoner of a Dream and Transition – all charted in the Netherlands, reaching numbers 51, 20 and 46, respectively, on the Dutch Albums Chart. Tellin' Stories was issued worldwide by Silvertone Records in 1994, registering at number 84 on the UK Albums Chart. Trout subsequently returned to Provogue and his albums continued to chart in the Netherlands.

Live Trout in 2000 and Go the Distance in 2000 and 2001, respectively, both reached the US Billboard Blues Albums chart top 20. 2006's Full Circle, credited to Walter Trout and Friends, reached number 2 on said chart and number 16 on the UK Jazz & Blues Albums Chart. Trout subsequently returned to Provogue and has seen increased chart success both in Europe and the US in recent years. Four albums – We're All in This Together (2017), Survivor Blues (2019), Ride (2022) and Broken (2024) – have topped the Billboard Blues Albums chart, while all studio albums since Battle Scars in 2015 have reached number 1 on the UK equivalent.

== Albums ==
=== Studio albums ===
List of studio albums, with selected chart positions
Title	Album details	Peak chart positions									
Title	Album details	US Blues	US Heat	AUT	BEL Fla.	BEL Wal.	GER	NED	SWI	UK	UK Blues
Life in the Jungle (as the Walter Trout Band)	Released: 1989; Label: Bozz; Format: LP	–	–	–	–	–	–	51	–	–	–
Prisoner of a Dream (as the Walter Trout Band)	Released: 1990; Label: Provogue; Formats: CD, LP	–	–	–	–	–	–	20	–	–	–
Transition (as the Walter Trout Band)	Released: October 9, 1992; Label: Provogue; Formats: CD, LP, cassette	–	–	–	–	–	–	46	–	–	–
Tellin' Stories (as the Walter Trout Band)	Released: June 28, 1994; Label: Silvertone; Formats: CD, LP, cassette	–	–	–	–	–	–	66	–	84	4
Breaking the Rules (as the Walter Trout Band)	Released: June 6, 1995; Label: Provogue; Format: CD	–	–	–	–	–	–	58	–	–	4
Positively Beale St. (as the Walter Trout Band)	Released: May 19, 1997; Label: Provogue; Format: CD	–	–	–	–	–	–	65	–	–	9
Livin' Every Day (as Walter Trout and the Free Radicals)	Released: May 1, 1999; Label: Ruf; Format: CD	–	–	–	–	–	–	–	–	–	24
Go the Distance (as Walter Trout and the Radicals)	Released: May 22, 2001; Label: Ruf; Format: CD	12	–	–	–	–	–	–	–	–	–
Full Circle (as Walter Trout and Friends)	Released: June 20, 2006; Label: Ruf; Formats: CD, download	2	–	–	–	–	–	–	–	–	16
The Outsider	Released: June 24, 2008; Label: Provogue; Formats: CD, download	3	–	–	–	–	–	81	–	–	6
Common Ground	Released: July 6, 2010; Label: Provogue; Formats: CD, LP, download	6	–	–	–	–	98	–	–	–	13
Blues for the Modern Daze	Released: April 23, 2012; Label: Provogue; Formats: CD, 2LP, download	4	12	63	–	–	33	62	96	61	1
Luther's Blues: A Tribute to Luther Allison (as Walter Trout & His Band)	Released: October 6, 2013; Label: Provogue; Formats: CD, 2LP, download	4	18	–	–	–	–	–	–	–	7
The Blues Came Callin’	Released: February 6, 2014; Label: Provogue; Formats: CD, CD+DVD, 2LP, download	2	6	–	135	186	50	42	71	90	3
Battle Scars	Released: October 23, 2015; Label: Provogue; Formats: CD, 2LP, download	2	11	57	148	–	52	37	–	54	1
We're All in This Together	Released: September 1, 2017; Label: Provogue; Formats: CD, 2LP, download	1	2	33	99	130	25	35	29	62	1
Survivor Blues	Released: January 25, 2019; Label: Provogue; Formats: CD, 2LP, download	1	4	28	126	93	27	73	18	–	1
Ordinary Madness	Released: August 28, 2020; Label: Provogue; Formats: CD, 2LP, download	2	–	45	–	175	24	38	19	99	1
Ride	Released: August 19, 2022; Label: Provogue; Formats: CD, 2LP, download	1	–	–	–	–	29	65	16	–	1
Broken	Released: March 1, 2024; Label: Provogue; Formats: CD, 2LP, download	1	–	29	151	–	18	37	14	–	1
Sign of the Times	Released: September 5, 2025; Label: Provogue; Formats: CD, LP, download	8	–	64	–	–	49	76	44	–	1
"–" denotes a release that did not chart or was not issued in that region.

=== Live albums ===
List of live albums, with selected chart positions
Title	Album details	Peak chart positions									
Title	Album details	US Blues	US Heat	AUT	BEL Fla.	BEL Wal.	GER	NED	SCO	SWI	UK Blues
Live: No More Fish Jokes (as the Walter Trout Band)	Released: May 17, 1993; Label: Provogue; Formats: CD, LP, cassette	–	–	–	–	–	–	63	–	–	–
Face the Music (Live on Tour) (as Walter Trout and the Free Radicals)	Released: January 31, 2000; Label: Provogue; Format: CD	–	–	–	–	–	–	–	–	–	–
Live Trout (as Walter Trout and the Free Radicals)	Released: June 13, 2000; Label: Ruf; Format: 2CD	15	–	–	–	–	–	–	–	–	–
Relentless (as Walter Trout and the Radicals)	Released: August 12, 2003; Label: Ruf; Formats: CD, SACD	12	–	–	–	–	–	–	–	–	–
Hardcore (as the Walter Trout Power Trio)	Released: July 6, 2007; Label: none (self-released); Format: CD	–	–	–	–	–	–	–	–	–	–
Alive in Amsterdam	Released: June 17, 2016; Label: Provogue; Formats: 2CD, 3LP, download	4	18	51	90	109	36	26	94	59	5
"–" denotes a release that did not chart or was not issued in that region.

=== Compilations ===
List of compilation albums, with selected chart positions
Title	Album details	Peaks	
Title	Album details	US Blues	UK Blues
Deep Trout: The Early Years of Walter Trout	Released: January 31, 2005; Label: Provogue; Formats: CD, 2CD	13	–
Unspoiled by Progress: 20 Years of Hardcore Blues	Released: June 15, 2009; Label: Provogue; Formats: CD, download	5	10
"–" denotes a release that did not chart or was not issued in that region.

== Extended plays ==
List of extended plays
Title	EP details
In Session	Released: December 1, 2015; Label: Cleopatra; Format: download

== Singles ==
List of singles, with selected chart positions, showing year released and album name
Title	Year	Peak	Album
Title	Year	NED	Album
"Say Goodbye to the Blues"	1990	—	Prisoner of a Dream
"The Love That We Once Knew"	1990	50	Prisoner of a Dream
"Life in the Jungle"	1991	—	Life in the Jungle
"Running in Place"	1992	—	Transition
"Motivation of Love"	1992	—	Transition
"Tremble"	1994	—	Tellin' Stories
"Please Don't Go"	1994	—	Tellin' Stories
"To Begin Again"	1995	—	Breaking the Rules
"Breaking the Rules"	1995	—	Breaking the Rules
"Let Me Be the One"	1997	—	Positively Beale St.
"Got a Broken Heart"	1998	—	Positively Beale St.
"Livin' Every Day"	1999	—	Livin' Every Day
"Go the Distance"	2001	—	Go the Distance
"Workin' Overtime"	2006	—	Full Circle
"All My Life"	2008	—	The Outsider
"Willie"	2014	—	The Blues Came Callin'
"Please Take Me Home"	2015	—	Battle Scars
"Playin' Hideaway"	2015	—	Battle Scars
"Fly Away"	2016	—	Battle Scars
"Almost Gone"	2016	—	Battle Scars
"Bleed"	2023	—	Broken
"Broken"	2024	—	Broken

== Video albums ==
List of video albums
Title	Album details
Relentless: The Concert (as Walter Trout and the Radicals)	Released: November 3, 2003; Label: Ruf; Format: DVD

== See also ==
- Canned Heat discography
- John Mayall discography
