= Deep Trout: The Early Years of Walter Trout =

Compilation album by Walter Trout
- Released: January 31, 2005
- Recorded: 1972–1995
- Genres: Blues rock; electric blues
- Length: 77:46
- Label: Provogue
- Producers: Walter Trout; Dave Anderson; Kevin Beamish; Willie Korman

Walter Trout solo chronology
| Relentless (2003) | Deep Trout: The Early Years of Walter Trout (2005) | Full Circle (2006) |

Deep Trout: The Early Years of Walter Trout is the first compilation album by American blues rock musician Walter Trout. Initially released in Europe by Provogue Records on January 31, 2005, it features tracks from several of Trout's early solo albums, in addition to three previously unreleased recordings. The album was later issued in North America by Ruf Records with an amended track listing, when it reached number 13 on the US Billboard Blues Albums chart.

== Background ==
With the exception of Tellin' Stories, which was issued worldwide by Silvertone Records as part of a single-album deal with the musician, all of Walter Trout's early solo albums (from Life in the Jungle to Breaking the Rules) were originally released in Europe only by Provogue Records. In 2004, the label therefore decided to compile highlights from these albums on a single compilation, Deep Trout. The album was released in Europe first, by Provogue, on January 31, 2005; the North American release followed on May 24, 2005, handled by Ruf Records. The first pressing of the album came with a bonus CD featuring an extended radio interview with Trout.

Provogue's release of Deep Trout is made up six tracks from 1990's Prisoner of a Dream, three from 1992's Transition, two from 1995's Breaking the Rules, and one from 1993's Live: No More Fish Jokes. Ruf's release features a slightly amended track listing, with three tracks from Prisoner of a Dream replaced by two more from Breaking the Rules and one more from Transition. Both releases also include three previously unreleased recordings: an acoustic version of "Life in the Jungle" (a song originally recorded for Trout's debut album), "Big Chain" with Freebo, and a 1972 recording of Junior Wells' "So Sad to Be Lonely" by Trout's former band Wilmont Mews.

Walter Trout and the Radicals toured in promotion of Deep Trout: The Early Years of Walter Trout, starting with European dates between April and May 2005. Shows in the US followed in June and July, following the Ruf release. This tour was the first to feature Rick Knapp on bass, who had initially replaced Jimmy Trapp on a temporary basis due to illness, but would later become Trout's permanent bassist when Trapp died in August.

== Reception ==
=== Commercial ===
Deep Trout: The Early Years of Walter Trout reached number 13 on the US Billboard Blues Albums chart.

=== Critical ===
Media response to Deep Trout was positive. Reviewing the album for Vintage Guitar, Bob Dragich described it as "the best of the best from the early years of [Trout's] career", writing that it demonstrates a range of musical styles ranging from "an insanely high level of metal blues" to "acoustic-backed balladry". AllMusic writer Hal Horowitz, featuring the North American version of the album, hailed Deep Trout as "a respectable overview of Trout's pre-2000s output".

== Track listing ==
Deep Trout: The Early Years of Walter Trout European version track listing
| No. | Title | Writer(s) | Length |
|---|---|---|---|
| 1. | "Put It Right Back" | Walter Trout | 6:03 |
| 2. | "The Love That We Once Knew" | W. Trout | 5:05 |
| 3. | "How Much Do You Want" | W. Trout | 4:36 |
| 4. | "Sweet as a Flower" | W. Trout; Jimmy Trapp | 4:18 |
| 5. | "Victor the Cajun" | W. Trout; Trapp; Danny Abrams | 4:20 |
| 6. | "Kill the Monkey" | W. Trout | 4:13 |
| 7. | "Earrings on the Table" | W. Trout | 1:44 |
| 8. | "Fast Moving Traffic" | W. Trout; Bernard Pershey; Marie B. Trout | 4:48 |
| 9. | "Motivation of Love" | W. Trout | 5:03 |
| 10. | "Love in Vain" | Robert Johnson | 5:57 |
| 11. | "If You Just Try" | W. Trout | 7:02 |
| 12. | "Tribute to Muddy Waters" | W. Trout | 6:02 |
| 13. | "Life in the Jungle" (acoustic version) | W. Trout | 5:37 |
| 14. | "Big Chain" | Freebo | 6:20 |
| 15. | "So Sad to Be Lonely" | Junior Wells | 6:38 |
| Total length: | | | 77:46 |

Notes

- Tracks 1 and 3 were originally released on Breaking the Rules (1995)
- Tracks 2, 4, 5, 7, 10 and 12 were originally released on Prisoner of a Dream (1990)
- Tracks 6, 8 and 9 were originally released on Transition (1992)
- Track 11 was originally released on Live: No More Fish Jokes (1993)
- Tracks 13–15 were previously unreleased

Deep Trout: The Early Years of Walter Trout North American version track listing
| No. | Title | Writer(s) | Length |
|---|---|---|---|
| 1. | "How Much Do You Want" | W. Trout | 4:36 |
| 2. | "To Begin Again" | W. Trout | 4:54 |
| 3. | "Put It Right Back" | Walter Trout | 6:05 |
| 4. | "Under My Skin" | W. Trout | 4:11 |
| 5. | "Victor the Cajun" | W. Trout; Trapp; Abrams | 4:21 |
| 6. | "Kill the Monkey" | W. Trout | 4:13 |
| 7. | "Running in Place" | W. Trout | 5:25 |
| 8. | "Fast Moving Traffic" | W. Trout; Pershey; M. Trout | 4:49 |
| 9. | "Earrings on the Table" | W. Trout | 1:44 |
| 10. | "Motivation of Love" | W. Trout | 5:04 |
| 11. | "If You Just Try" | W. Trout | 7:02 |
| 12. | "Tribute to Muddy Waters" | W. Trout | 6:02 |
| 13. | "Life in the Jungle" (acoustic version) | W. Trout | 5:38 |
| 14. | "Big Chain" | Freebo | 6:19 |
| 15. | "So Sad to Be Lonely" | Wells | 6:39 |
| Total length: | | | 77:02 |

Notes

- Tracks 1–4 were originally released on Breaking the Rules (1995)
- Tracks 5, 9 and 12 were originally released on Prisoner of a Dream (1990)
- Tracks 6–8 and 10 were originally released on Transition (1992)
- Track 11 was originally released on Live: No More Fish Jokes (1993)
- Tracks 13–15 were previously unreleased

== Personnel ==
Musicians
- Walter Trout – lead and backing vocals, guitar, harmonica, mandolin, production (Breaking the Rules tracks and "If You Just Try")
- Jimmy Trapp – bass (all except the previously unreleased tracks)
- Bernard Pershey – drums (Breaking the Rules and Transition tracks)
- Martin Gerschwitz – keyboards and piano (Breaking the Rules tracks and "Life in the Jungle")
- Klas Anderhell – drums (Prisoner of a Dream tracks)
- Danny "Mongo" Abrams – organ (Prisoner of a Dream and Transition tracks)
- Frank Cotinola – drums ("If You Just Try")
- Freebo – vocals and bass ("Big Chain")
- Marty Walsch – rhythm guitar ("Big Chain")
- Oliver Leiber – rhythm guitar ("Big Chain")
- Michael Jochum – drums and percussion ("Big Chain")
- Mark T. Jordan – organ and electric piano ("Big Chain")
- Jesse Pena – bass ("So Sad to Be Lonely")
- Ed Bilski – drums ("So Sad to Be Lonely")
- Marty Herman – keyboards ("So Sad to Be Lonely")

Production personnel

- Charlie Watts – engineering (Breaking the Rules and Transition tracks); co-production and mixing ("If You Just Try")
- Tim Nitz – engineering assistance (Breaking the Rules tracks)
- Gabe Chiesa – engineering assistance (Breaking the Rules tracks)
- Dave Anderson – production and mixing (Prisoner of a Dream tracks)
- Kevin Beamish – production and mixing (Transition tracks)
- Willie Korman – co-production ("If You Just Try")
- Sven Thornsen – recording ("If You Just Try")
- Wilbert Mews – recording ("So Sad to Be Lonely")

Additional personnel

- Valerie Behling – design, layout
- Gary Smith – photography

== Charts ==
Chart performance for Deep Trout: The Early Years of Walter Trout
| Chart (2005) | Peak position |
|---|---|
| Blues Albums (Billboard) | 13 |
