= Luther's Blues: A Tribute to Luther Allison =

Studio album by Walter Trout & His Band
- Released: June 10, 2013
- Recorded: January 2013
- Studio: Entourage Studios (North Hollywood, Los Angeles)
- Genre: Blues rock; electric blues
- Length: 65:35
- Label: Provogue
- Producer: Walter Trout; Eric Corne

Walter Trout chronology
Blues for the Modern Daze (2012)	Luther's Blues: A Tribute to Luther Allison (2013)	The Blues Came Callin' (2014)

Luther's Blues: A Tribute to Luther Allison is the 13th studio album by American blues rock musician Walter Trout, credited to Walter Trout & His Band. Recorded in January 2013 at Entourage Studios in North Hollywood, Los Angeles, it was self-produced by Trout with engineer Eric Corne, and released on June 10, 2013, by Provogue Records. The album is a tribute to blues musician Luther Allison (1939–1997), named after his 1974 album Luther's Blues.

Trout had planned to record a tribute to Allison since his death in 1997. He decided to do so in 2013, working with the same musicians and producer as on his 2012 album Blues for the Modern Daze. The album features cover versions of 11 songs originally recorded by Allison, as well as one song written by Trout in tribute to him. Luther's Blues reached number 4 on the US Billboard Blues Albums chart and number 7 on the UK Jazz & Blues Albums Chart.

== Background ==
Walter Trout and Luther Allison first met in July 1986, when they were both performing at the Montreux Jazz Festival in Switzerland – Trout as a member of John Mayall & the Bluesbreakers at the time. Speaking about watching his set at the festival, Trout recalled that "Luther was one of the all-time greats. It was just an unbelievably potent thing to watch him perform. The energy and commitment that guy had – he was one of a kind." A photo taken of the pair backstage at the festival was used as the basis for the cover artwork for Luther's Blues. Trout first thought of the idea to record a tribute album for Allison after his death in 1997.

Trout first recorded a cover version of a Luther Allison song in 2006, recording "When Will It Ever Change" for the album Full Circle, with Allison's son Bernard featured on vocals and guitar. Following the release and touring of Blues for the Modern Daze in 2012, Trout and his band recorded Luther's Blues at the same location (Entourage Studios in North Hollywood, Los Angeles) with the same production team (helmed by co-producer and engineer Eric Corne). Guests include Melvyn "Deacon" Jones on organ for "Move from the Hood", Bernard Allison on vocals and slide guitar for "Low Down and Dirty", and John Avila on bass for "Freedom".

== Reception ==
=== Commercial ===
Luther's Blues was Trout's fifth album to reach the top five of the US Billboard Blues Albums chart, reaching number 4. It was also his second release to register on the Heatseekers Albums chart, peaking at number 18. Outside the US, the album reached number 7 on the UK Jazz & Blues Albums Chart, number 30 on the UK Independent Albums Chart, and number 4 on the UK Independent Album Breakers Chart.

=== Critical ===
Professional ratings
Review scores
Source	Rating
AllMusic	4.5/5 stars
Classic Rock	4/5 stars

Media response to Luther's Blues was widely positive. Al Campbell of AllMusic claimed that the album "rises to the top with the best" amongst blues tribute albums, praising Trout's "undisputed guitar dexterity" and "top-notch vocal work". Classic Rock writer Gavin Martin was similarly positive, suggesting that "Covers albums can sometimes be ... a chance to ease off the intensity. Not so here, where the unbridled feeling and ferocity on display is a testimony to the ardour of a long-held passion and friendship." Jeb Wright of Classic Rock Revisited described Luther's Blues as "an emotional album ... full of reverence, friendship and a touch of sorrow", concluding that "Walter played his ass off on this one, inspired by another's greatness allowing him to achieve his own". Pete Feenstra of Get Ready to Rock! gave the album four out of five stars, calling it "a triumph of ambition, focus and sheer ability" and "an impressive album that fully realises its lofty ambitions".

== Track listing ==
Luther's Blues: A Tribute to Luther Allison track listing
No.	Title	Writer(s)	Length
1.	"I'm Back"	Luther Allison; James Solberg	4:31
2.	"Cherry Red Wine"	L. Allison	4:22
3.	"Move from the Hood"	L. Allison; Solberg	3:32
4.	"Bad Love"	L. Allison; Solberg	5:14
5.	"Big City"	L. Allison; Solberg	6:25
6.	"Chicago"	L. Allison; Frank Rabaste; Michel Carras; Carolyn "Rocky" Brown	5:15
7.	"Just As I Am"	L. Allison; Solberg; Sandy Carroll	5:10
8.	"Low Down and Dirty"	Bernard Allison	4:19
9.	"Pain in the Streets"	L. Allison; Solberg	5:46
10.	"All the King's Horses"	L. Allison; Solberg	5:48
11.	"Freedom"	L. Allison; Rabaste; Carras; François Camuzeaux; Jay Mattes; Brown	7:22
12.	"Luther Speaks"	L. Allison	0:24
13.	"When Luther Played the Blues"	Walter Trout	7:27
Total length:			65:35

== Personnel ==
Band members

- Walter Trout – vocals, guitar, production, liner notes
- Rick Knapp – bass (all except tracks 11 and 12)
- Michael Leasure – drums (all except track 12)
- Sammy Avila – organ (tracks 1, 2, 4–6, 8–11 and 13)

Additional musicians

- Skip Edwards – piano (track 2), keyboards (track 7), electric piano (track 11)
- Melvyn "Deacon" Jones – organ (track 3)
- Bernard Allison – vocals and slide guitar (track 8), liner notes
- John Avila – bass (track 11)

Additional personnel

- Eric Corne – production, engineering, mixing
- Maor Appelbaum – mastering
- Roy Koch – artwork
- Brittany Fay – photography
- Jef Jaisun – photography
- Carolyn "Rocky" Brown – liner notes
- James Solberg – liner notes

== Charts ==
Chart performance for Luther's Blues: A Tribute to Luther Allison
Chart (2013)	Peak position
UK Independent Albums (OCC)	30
UK Independent Album Breakers (OCC)	4
UK Jazz & Blues Albums (OCC)	7
US Blues Albums (Billboard)	4
US Heatseekers Albums (Billboard)	18
