= Unspoiled by Progress: 20 Years of Hardcore Blues =

Compilation album by Walter Trout
- Released: June 23, 2009
- Recorded: 1989–2009
- Genre: Blues rock; electric blues
- Length: 77:54
- Label: Provogue
- Producer: Walter Trout; Eric Corne

Walter Trout chronology
The Outsider (2008)	Unspoiled by Progress: 20 Years of Hardcore Blues (2009)	Common Ground (2010)

Unspoiled by Progress: 20 Years of Hardcore Blues is the second compilation album by American blues rock musician Walter Trout. Released on June 23, 2009, by Provogue Records, it features previously unreleased recordings from across Trout's solo career, including live tracks and radio recordings, as well as three new studio tracks. The album reached number 5 on the US Billboard Blues Albums chart and number 10 on the UK Jazz & Blues Albums Chart.

== Background ==
Trout released Unspoiled by Progress to mark the 20th anniversary of the start of his solo career, compiling recordings from various shows and radio sessions between 1989 and 2005. In a review of the album for the website AllMusic, Michael G. Nastos reports that "This collection has Trout picking favorites from various live performances recorded over the years by the BBC and, as he puts it, were selected favoring performance over recording quality." The album features the last recording with Trout's band of bassist Jimmy Trapp, who died in 2006. Alongside recordings from throughout Trout's career, Unspoiled by Progress also features three new studio recordings by Trout and his band – bassist Rick Knapp, drummer Michael Leasure and keyboardist Sammy Avila – one of which ("They Call Us the Working Class") was released alongside a music video ahead of the album. Unspoiled by Progress was issued by Provogue Records in Europe on June 23, 2009, and in North America on July 21, 2009.

== Reception ==
=== Commercial ===
Unspoiled by Progress was Trout's third album to reach the top five of the US Billboard Blues Albums chart, peaking at number 5. In the UK, the album reached number 10 on the UK Jazz & Blues Albums Chart, number 46 on the UK Independent Albums Chart, and number 15 on the UK Independent Album Breakers Chart.

=== Critical ===
Professional ratings
Review scores
Source	Rating
AllMusic	4/5 stars

Media response to Unspoiled by Progress was positive. Michael G. Nastos of AllMusic gave the album four out of five stars and wrote that "While there's nothing groundbreaking here, or out of character with Trout's reputation and estimable talent, it's a solid collection of songs featuring the worked-up guitar of the leader that should appeal to the guitar hero nation without reservation." Alan Jones of Get Ready to Rock! described the album as "truly great", awarding it a full five-star rating and noting that "With all of Walter's releases you always worry that he's going to change and get all modern on our asses, but as the title says – he's unspoiled by progress, and we hope that continues for a very long time." Other positive reviews came from Guitar magazine, which proclaimed that "His guitar shines through on both the studio and live recordings. The grooves are all top-notch"; and Classic Rock magazine, which stated that "20 years later and he is playing with a vigour and stamina that outstrips young pretenders less than half his age. This is a winning testament to a seasoned but still emotively charged performer".

== Track listing ==
All tracks are written by Walter Trout, except where noted.

Unspoiled by Progress: 20 Years of Hardcore Blues track listing
No.	Title	Writer(s)	Length
1.	"They Call Us the Working Class"		4:34
2.	"Goin' Down"	Don Nix	6:16
3.	"Life in the Jungle"		6:39
4.	"Long Tall Sally"	Little Richard; Robert Blackwell; Enotris Johnson	5:39
5.	"Jimmy as Yoko"	Jimmy Trapp	0:20
6.	"Somebody's Acting Like a Child"	John Mayall	7:49
7.	"Hey Barney"		0:19
8.	"Sweet as a Flower"	Trout; Trapp	8:13
9.	"Two Sides to Every Story"		4:34
10.	"Finally Gotten Over You"		11:38
11.	"Goin' Back Home"	Finis Tasby	3:32
12.	"Marie's Mood"		6:02
13.	"She's Out There Somewhere"	Buddy Guy	5:17
14.	"So Afraid of the Darkness"		6:56
Total length:			77:54

Notes

- Tracks 1, 9 and 14 were recorded at House of Blues Recorders in Los Angeles, California on March 3, 2009
- Tracks 2 and 13 were recorded at Maida Vale Studios in London, England on August 18, 1991
- Tracks 3 and 4 were recorded at Paradiso in Amsterdam, Netherlands in 1991
- Tracks 5–7 were recorded at Perq's Nightclub in Huntington Beach, California in 1989
- Track 8 was recorded at Boulder Station Hotel & Casino in Sunrise Manor, Nevada on May 26, 2005
- Tracks 10 and 11 were recorded at Bonn Blues Festival in Bonn, Germany on November 24, 1991
- Track 12 was recorded at Leverkusen Blues Festival in Leverkusen, Germany on May 3, 1997

== Personnel ==
Musicians

- Walter Trout – vocals, guitar, production
- Jimmy Trapp – bass (all except tracks 1, 9 and 14)
- Rick Knapp – bass (tracks 1, 9 and 14)
- Michael Leasure – drums (tracks 1, 9 and 14)
- Frank Cotinola – drums (tracks 2–4 and 13)
- Richie Hayward – drums (tracks 5–7)
- Joey Pafumi – drums (track 8)
- Bernard Pershey – drums (tracks 10 and 11)
- Charles "Rick" Elliott – drums (track 12)
- Sammy Avila – organ (tracks 1, 8, 9 and 14)
- Danny "Mongo" Abrams – organ (tracks 2–7, 10–11 and 13)
- Martin Gerschwitz – keyboards (track 12)

Additional personnel

- Eric Corne – production, engineering, mixing (tracks 1, 9 and 14)
- George Lyons – engineering (tracks 5–8)
- Mark Chalecki – mastering
- Misha Van Tol – artwork

== Charts ==
Chart performance for Unspoiled by Progress: 20 Years of Hardcore Blues
Chart (2009)	Peak position
UK Independent Albums (OCC)	46
UK Independent Album Breakers (OCC)	15
UK Jazz & Blues Albums (OCC)	10
US Blues Albums (Billboard)	5
