= Face the Music (Live on Tour) =

Live album by Walter Trout and the Free Radicals
- Released: January 31, 2000
- Recorded: 1999
- Genre: Blues rock; electric blues
- Length: 54:32
- Label: Provogue
- Producer: Walter Trout

Walter Trout solo chronology
Livin' Every Day (1999)	Face the Music (Live on Tour) (2000)	Live Trout (2000)

Face the Music (Live on Tour) is the second solo live album by American blues rock musician Walter Trout, credited to Walter Trout and the Free Radicals. Released in Europe only on January 31, 2000, by Provogue Records, it features recordings from the group's 1999 worldwide concert tour in promotion of Livin' Every Day, including performances at both European and North American shows. The album was later reissued to mark the 25th anniversary of Trout's solo career in 2014.

== Background ==
Face the Music (Live on Tour) was recorded during Walter Trout and the Free Radicals' world tour in 1999 and released in Europe only on January 31, 2000. The album was part of a series of vinyl reissues to mark the 25th anniversary of Trout's solo career, being released on December 16, 2014.

== Track listing ==
All tracks are written by Walter Trout; track 3 co-written by Jimmy Trapp, Bernard Pershey and Martin Gerschwitz.

Face the Music (Live on Tour) track listing
No.	Title	Length
1.	"Got a Broken Heart"	7:22
2.	"Hard Time Blues"	3:40
3.	"The Reason I'm Gone"	10:18
4.	"Come Home"	7:53
5.	"Marie's Mood"	5:21
6.	"Too Much Biz"	2:31
7.	"Obstacles in My Way"	3:44
8.	"Tired of Sleeping Alone"	7:30
9.	"On the Rise"	6:13
Total length:		54:32

== Personnel ==
Walter Trout and the Free Radicals

- Walter Trout – vocals, guitar, production
- Jimmy Trapp – bass
- Bernard Pershey – drums, percussion
- Paul Kallestad – organ

Additional personnel

- Phil Caseberry – engineering (European tracks)
- Dan Araco – engineering (North American tracks)
- Doug Hounsell – engineering assistance (North American tracks)
- Charlie Watts – mixing, mastering
- Robin Elvin – artwork (concept and painting)
- Lisa Elvin – photography (Walter Trout live)
- Marie B. Trout – photography (band members)
