= Breaking the Rules (album) =

Studio album by the Walter Trout Band
- Released: June 6, 1995
- Recorded: January 15 – February 28, 1995
- Studio: Soundcastle (Los Angeles, California)
- Genre: Blues rock; electric blues
- Length: 53:20
- Label: Provogue
- Producer: Walter Trout

Walter Trout solo chronology
Tellin' Stories (1994)	Breaking the Rules (1995)	Positively Beale St. (1997)

Singles from Breaking the Rules
- 1. "Breaking the Rules" Released: 1995; 2. "To Begin Again" Released: 1995

Breaking the Rules is the fifth solo studio album by American blues rock musician Walter Trout, credited to the Walter Trout Band. Recorded from January 15 to February 28, 1995, at Soundcastle in Los Angeles, California, it was Trout's first album to be self-produced, and was released on June 6, 1995, by Provogue Records. The album reached number 58 on the Dutch Albums Chart and number 4 on the UK Jazz & Blues Albums Chart.

== Background ==
After releasing his band's fourth studio album Tellin' Stories on Silvertone Records, Walter Trout returned to his original label Provogue Records for Breaking the Rules. In a 1999 interview, the guitarist recalled that "they [Silvertone] didn't do a very good job for me, either in Europe or America. All my record sales in Europe started to go down and I realised that Europe was my bread and butter", leading to him re-signing with Provogue. Recording for Breaking the Rules took place between January 15 and February 28, 1995, at Soundcastle in Los Angeles, California, with Trout taking on production duties for the first time in his career.

== Reception ==
=== Commercial ===
Breaking the Rules reached number 58 on the Dutch Albums Chart and number 4 on the UK Jazz & Blues Albums Chart.

=== Critical ===
Professional ratings
Review scores
Source	Rating
Los Angeles Times	3.5/5 stars

Breaking the Rules received positive reviews from critics. Reviewing the album for the Los Angeles Times, Mike Boehm proclaimed it to be Trout's best album since 1990's Prisoner of a Dream, writing that "Trout can handle pop and rock songwriting, as well as play within the styles and forms of traditional blues. His approach here is to strike a balance – a good choice that lets him blaze bluesily on some tracks, while demonstrating a good ear for melody on such pop-leaning highlights". Boehm also praised Trout's first effort as a producer, claiming that he "gives himself and his band mates something they lacked on Tellin' Stories and its predecessor, Transition: a broad, uncluttered sonic field on which to operate". A review in Music & Media described Breaking the Rules as "a refreshing mix of rock and blues".

== Track listing ==
All tracks are written by Walter Trout; track 7 co-written by Jimmy Trapp, Bernard Pershey and Martin Gerschwitz.

Breaking the Rules track listing
No.	Title	Length
1.	"To Begin Again"	4:53
2.	"How Much Do You Want"	4:37
3.	"Under My Skin"	4:12
4.	"Like a Stranger"	5:08
5.	"Surrounded by Eden"	5:55
6.	"Breaking the Rules"	4:10
7.	"The Reason I'm Gone"	6:21
8.	"I Don't Wanna Be Lonely"	4:31
9.	"Put It Right Back"	6:03
10.	"Lady Luck"	3:30
11.	"Watch Her Dance"	4:00
Total length:		53:20

== Personnel ==
Walter Trout Band

- Walter Trout – vocals, (Note: Trout is also credited under the alias "Wally Bass" with performing backing vocals.) guitar, harmonica, production, art concept
- Jimmy Trapp – bass
- Bernard Pershey – drums, percussion
- Martin Gerschwitz – keyboards, violin

Additional musicians

- Teresa James – backing vocals
- Danny Timms – backing vocals

Additional personnel

- Charlie Watts – engineering
- Tim Nitz – engineering assistance
- Gabe Chiesa – engineering assistance
- Mike Iacopelli – mastering
- Paul Roos – design
- Dora Larson – illustration

== Charts ==
Chart performance for Breaking the Rules
Chart (1995)	Peak position
Dutch Albums (MegaCharts)	58
UK Jazz & Blues Albums (OCC)	4
