= Full Circle (Walter Trout album) =

Studio album by Walter Trout and Friends
- Released: June 20, 2006
- Recorded: January 21 – March 8, 2006
- Studio: Liquid Recording Studio (Toronto, Ontario); Mad Dog Studios (Burbank, California)
- Genre: Blues rock; electric blues
- Length: 70:39
- Label: Ruf; Provogue
- Producer: Walter Trout

Walter Trout solo chronology
Deep Trout: The Early Years of Walter Trout (2005)	Full Circle (2006)	Hardcore (2007)

Singles from Full Circle
- 1. "Workin' Overtime" Released: 2006

Full Circle is the ninth studio album by American blues rock musician Walter Trout, credited to Walter Trout and Friends. Recorded between January and March 2006 in Canada and California, it was self-produced by Trout and released on June 20, 2006, by Ruf Records and Provogue Records. Alongside the main lineup of Trout, bassist Rick Knapp and drummer Richie Hayward, the album features guest performers on every track, including Trout's former bandmates John Mayall and Coco Montoya. Full Circle reached number 2 on the US Billboard Blues Albums chart and number 16 on the UK Jazz & Blues Albums Chart.

== Background ==
Recording for Walter Trout's ninth album took place at Liquid Recording Studio in Toronto, Ontario, Canada, and Mad Dog Studios in Burbank, California, between January 21 and March 8, 2006. According to its announcement press release, the album is intended to be "a celebration of the diverse styles within the blues genre", and represents "the realization of [Trout's] long held dream to invite musician-friends from his 35+ year career to compose and play together with him". Alongside a core band lineup of Trout, bassist Rick Knapp and drummer Richie Hayward, Full Circle includes guest performers on every song, including former John Mayall & the Bluesbreakers bandmates John Mayall and Coco Montoya, Provogue labelmate Joe Bonamassa, and former bandleader Melvyn "Deacon" Jones.

Walter Trout and the Radicals (including Knapp, drummer Joey Pafumi and keyboardist Sammy Avila) toured in promotion of Full Circle during late 2006 and early 2007. During the touring cycle, the band also completed a short tour in the UK, the Netherlands and Germany under the name of the Walter Trout Power Trio, with Avila stepping back from the lineup for a limited time during March and April 2007. In July 2007, the band self-released Hardcore, featuring recordings from the tour as a trio.

== Reception ==
=== Commercial ===
Following its release on June 20, 2006, Full Circle debuted at number 2 on the US Billboard Blues Albums chart – Trout's first release to break into the top ten. Outside the US, it registered at number 16 on the UK Jazz & Blues Albums Chart – Trout's first release since Positively Beale St. in 1997 to reach the top 20.

=== Critical ===
Media response to Full Circle was positive. AllMusic writer Hal Horowitz suggested that "Deep blues fans will still probably shy away due to the album's guitar heavy appeal and Trout's tendency to overextend his furious solos. But for the blues-rocker who loves a rugged blast of electricity and barrages of notes played with no-frills intensity, this is arguably Trout's most listenable, impressive, and diverse album yet." The Norwegian blues magazine Blues Music Club selected it as its record of the month for March 2006, proclaiming that "This is not just a blues/rock album. It's a celebration of blues music as Walter Trout sees it. It has been about honestly sharing this genre of music that he loves with the audience and with musician friends delivered with an open mind and delivered straight from the heart."

== Track listing ==
Full Circle track listing
No.	Title	Writer(s)	Featured artist	Length
1.	"She Takes More Than She Gives"	Walter Trout	John Mayall	8:41
2.	"Workin' Overtime"	W. Trout; Marie B. Trout	Jeff Healey	5:48
3.	"Firehouse Mama"	W. Trout; Eric Sardinas	Eric Sardinas	5:07
4.	"Who's Listenin' In"	W. Trout; M. Trout	Coco Montoya	6:51
5.	"Slap Happy"	Junior Watson	Junior Watson	2:31
6.	"Wrapped Around Your Finger"	W. Trout	Guitar Shorty	5:02
7.	"A Busy Man"	James Harman	James Harman	7:40
8.	"Highway Song"	W. Trout; John Mayall	John Mayall	2:54
9.	"When Will It Ever Change"	Luther Allison; James Solberg	Bernard Allison	4:57
10.	"Can't Help Falling Apart"	W. Trout	Finis Tasby	4:00
11.	"After Hours"	Erskine Hawkins	Deacon Jones	6:48
12.	"Clouds on the Horizon"	W. Trout; Joe Bonamassa	Joe Bonamassa	7:51
13.	"Full Circle"	Larry Keene	Larry Keene	2:29
Total length:				70:39

== Personnel ==
Band members
- Walter Trout – vocals, guitar, harmonica, production
- Rick Knapp – bass (tracks 1, 4, 6 and 8–12)
- Richie Hayward – drums (tracks 1, 6, 8 and 10–12)
- Joey Pafumi – drums (tracks 4 and 9)
- Sammy Avila – organ (tracks 4 and 9)

Featured guest musicians

- John Mayall – vocals, piano and harmonica (track 1), guitar (track 8)
- Jeff Healey – vocals and guitar (track 2)
- Eric Sardinas – vocals and acoustic guitar (track 3)
- Coco Montoya – vocals and guitar (track 4)
- Junior Watson – guitar (track 5)
- Melvyn "Deacon" Jones – organ (tracks 6, 10 and 11)
- Guitar Shorty – vocals and guitar (track 6)
- James Harman – vocals and harmonica (track 7)
- Bernard Allison – vocals and guitar (track 9)
- Finis Tasby – vocals (track 10)
- Joe Bonamassa – vocals and guitar (track 12)
- Larry Keene – voice (track 13)

Additional guest musicians

- Alec Fraser – bass (track 2)
- Al Webster – drums (track 2)
- Dave Murphy – organ (track 2)
- Jonny Ray Bartel – bass (track 5)
- Bill Bateman – drums (track 5)
- Buddy Clark – bass (track 7)
- Steven Hodges – drums (track 7)
- Rob Rio – piano (track 7)
- Danny Timms – piano (track 8)

Additional personnel

- Eric Corne – engineering, mixing
- Peter Doell – mastering
- Gary E. Smith – cover photography
- Andrew Elt – inlay photography
- Marie B. Trout – photography
- Neil Zlozower – photography

== Charts ==
Chart performance for Full Circle
Chart (2006)	Peak position
Blues Albums (Billboard)	2
UK Jazz & Blues Albums (OCC)	16
