= Hardcore (Walter Trout album) =

Live album by the Walter Trout Power Trio
- Released: July 6, 2007
- Recorded: March 17 – April 3, 2007
- Venue: Mick Jagger Centre (Dartford, England); Albert Halls (Bolton, England); Theater Romein (Leeuwarden, Netherlands); De Bosuil (Weert, Netherlands)
- Genre: Blues rock; electric blues
- Length: 70:06
- Producer: Walter Trout

Walter Trout solo chronology
Full Circle (2006)	Hardcore (2007)	The Outsider (2008)

Hardcore is the fifth live album by American blues rock musician Walter Trout, credited to the Walter Trout Power Trio. Recorded over four shows on the Hard Core Blues Rock Tour in the UK and the Netherlands between March and April 2007, it was self-produced by Trout and released independently on July 6, 2007.

== Background ==
During the tour in promotion of the 2006 album Full Circle, Walter Trout and the Radicals were forced to perform a show in London without keyboardist Sammy Avila, when his Hammond organ broke just before the band were due onstage. After the show, Trout decided to embark on a short tour with this reduced lineup in the spring of 2007; the tour was described as a "unique one time only" arrangement, which Trout assured he had "absolutely no plans to make this a permanent version of the Radicals". Dubbed the Hard Core Blues Rock Tour, the run included a total of 19 shows in the UK and Europe between March 15 and April 3, 2007.

The band surprise-released Hardcore, featuring tracks from the "power trio" tour, as an independent release through online platforms CD Baby and iTunes in July 2007. The album includes nine tracks recorded at four shows on the tour – three at the Mick Jagger Centre in Dartford on March 17, one at Albert Halls in Bolton on March 25, two at Theater Romein in Leeuwarden on April 2, and three at De Bosuil in Weert on April 3.

== Track listing ==
All tracks are written by Walter Trout, except where noted.

Hardcore track listing
No.	Title	Writer(s)	Length
1.	"Gotta Leave This Town"		9:00
2.	"Tellin' Stories"		7:31
3.	"Finally Gotten Over You"		7:44
4.	"Give Me Back My Wig"	Hound Dog Taylor	6:30
5.	"The Reason I'm Gone"		11:13
6.	"Not Fade Away"	Buddy Holly	5:18
7.	"Channeling Neil Young"		0:56
8.	"Sittin on Top of the World"	Howlin' Wolf	5:45
9.	"Tribute to Muddy Waters"		16:09
Total length:			70:06

== Personnel ==
The Walter Trout Power Trio

- Walter Trout – vocals, guitar, production, cover concept, photography
- Rick Knapp – bass
- Joey Pafumi – drums

Additional personnel

- Phil Caseberry – engineering
- Eric Corne – mixing, mastering
- Andrew Elt – art design, layout, photography
- Dick Holthuis – live photography
- Steve Goudie – live photography
