= Blues for the Modern Daze =

Studio album by Walter Trout
- Released: April 23, 2012
- Recorded: October 2011
- Studio: Entourage Studios (North Hollywood, Los Angeles)
- Genre: Blues rock; electric blues
- Length: 77:52
- Label: Provogue
- Producer: Walter Trout; Eric Corne

Walter Trout chronology
Common Ground (2010)	Blues for the Modern Daze (2012)	Luther's Blues: A Tribute to Luther Allison (2013)

Blues for the Modern Daze is the 12th studio album by American blues rock musician Walter Trout. Recorded in October 2011 at Entourage Studios in North Hollywood, Los Angeles, it was produced by Trout with engineer Eric Corne, and released on April 23, 2012, by Provogue Records. The album features a core lineup of Rick Knapp on bass, Michael Leasure on drums, and Sammy Avila on keyboards, alongside returning guests Skip Edwards, Rob Rio and Melvyn "Deacon" Jones.

Unlike the majority of his solo albums up to that point, which incorporated elements of both blues and rock styles, on Blues for the Modern Daze Trout attempted to focus solely on "traditional" blues, taking a more straightforward approach to songwriting whilst trying to draw on various sub-genres. The album was a commercial success, giving Trout his first UK Jazz & Blues Albums Chart number one and charting in several European territories for the first time in his career.

== Background ==
Walter Trout and his band recorded Blues for the Modern Daze at Entourage Studios in North Hollywood, Los Angeles in October 2011. The album was first revealed in January 2012 as part of an announcement on Trout's official website of the final leg of the tour in promotion of 2010's Common Ground, in which it was teased that attendees at upcoming shows would be treated to a "Preview of the new songs". The album was officially announced the following month, with an official press release suggesting that "The new album showcases the contemporary guitar legend's return to his hardcore blues roots, with songwriting at a creative and personal zenith."

After most of his previous albums were categorised as some level of fusion between blues and rock music, on Blues for the Modern Daze Trout sought to produce "his first full-fledged blues album". He identified early gospel blues musician Blind Willie Johnson as the "main inspiration" for the record, reflecting that "I wanted to feel [his music] at my back when we were cutting these songs." In an interview with Jeb Wright of Classic Rock Revisited, Trout explained that "When I decided to write this album I wanted to be diverse", adding that "There are many ways you can do the genre of the Blues. There are many subcategories that you can explore".

Speaking about the lyrical themes of the album, Trout has suggested that "It sums up the thoughts and attitudes of somebody who is getting a little older and is feeling like he's a part of another era, with different values and a different perspective on life that's prevalent today." In the Classic Rock Revisited interview, he explained the meaning of the album's title: "Technology is exploding at an incredible pace ... I do not see where the technology is doing anything to increase our understanding, or our tolerance, of each other. I don't see it doing anything to increase our humanity." Describing the writing of the album, he reflected that "I really almost set out to be an observer of what is going on in the world, almost like a reporter. I just sang about what I see going on in the world through my own eyes."

== Reception ==
=== Commercial ===
Blues for the Modern Daze debuted at number 4 on the US Billboard Blues Albums chart – Trout's fourth release to reach the top five of the chart. It was also his first to register on the Heatseekers Albums chart, peaking at number 12. In the UK, the album was Trout's first since Tellin' Stories in 1994 to register on the UK Albums Chart, reaching number 61; it was also his first to top the UK Jazz & Blues Albums Chart and the UK Independent Album Breakers Chart, his first to reach the top ten of the UK Independent Albums Chart (number 9), and his first to register on the Scottish Albums Chart (number 61). In mainland Europe, the album reached number 33 in Germany, number 62 in the Netherlands, and was Trout's first album to chart in Sweden (number 59), Austria (number 63), and Switzerland (number 96).

=== Critical ===
Professional ratings
Review scores
Source	Rating
AllMusic	3.5/5 stars
Classic Rock	3/5 stars

Media response to Blues for the Modern Daze was positive. Reviewing the album for Classic Rock magazine, Charles Shaar Murray praised the quality of Trout's songwriting, highlighting "Recovery" and "Brother's Keeper" as "genuinely moving slow-blues vehicles ... evidence of how a composer with something urgent to say can utilise traditional forms for genuine emotional impact". Also focusing on the album's songwriting, Larry Toering of the Music Street Journal wrote that "Some deep and very personal issues are covered [on Blues for the Modern Daze], and it makes things all the more intense and interesting".

Other commentators focused on Trout's guitar-playing in their reviews of Blues for the Modern Daze. Writing for Blues Rock Review, Pete Francis first praised the musician's vocal performances, before concluding his review with: "While Trout's vocals are solid throughout, the biggest story of the album is his guitar work. Based on this album, it is clear why Trout was a highly sought after sideman for many years". For Classic Rock Revisited, Jeb Wright also praised the musical elements of the album, stating that "this one doesn't just succeed lyrically, musically it is a dynamo. Trout is playing with a cutting conviction".

== Track listing ==
All tracks are written by Walter Trout.

Blues for the Modern Daze track listing
No.	Title	Length
1.	"Saw My Mama Cryin'"	5:52
2.	"Lonely"	4:52
3.	"The Sky Is Fallin' Down"	3:42
4.	"Blues for My Baby"	7:57
5.	"You Can't Go Home Again"	5:49
6.	"Recovery"	6:24
7.	"Turn Off Your TV"	3:30
8.	"Lifestyle of the Rich and Famous"	6:16
9.	"Never Knew You Well"	6:14
10.	"Puppet Master"	0:45
11.	"Money Rules the World"	4:37
12.	"All I Want Is You"	5:21
13.	"Brother's Keeper"	7:01
14.	"Blues for the Modern Daze"	6:18
15.	"Pray for Rain"	3:14
Total length:		77:52

== Personnel ==
Band members

- Walter Trout – vocals, (Note: Trout is also credited under the alias "Wally Bass" with performing backing vocals on tracks 5 and 6.) guitar, harmonica (tracks 3 and 12), production
- Rick Knapp – bass (all except tracks 10 and 15)
- Michael Leasure – drums (all except tracks 10 and 15)
- Sammy Avila – organ (tracks 1–3, 5, 6, 8 and 14)

Additional musicians

- Skip Edwards – electric piano (tracks 2 and 6), organ (tracks 11 and 12)
- Rob Rio – piano (tracks 4 and 8)
- Melvyn "Deacon" Jones – organ (tracks 7 and 13)

Additional personnel

- Eric Corne – production, engineering, mixing, percussion (tracks 3, 5, 9, 12 and 14), backing vocals (track 5), background music (track 10)
- Zavosh Rad – engineering assistance
- Maor Appelbaum – mastering
- Roy Koch – artwork
- Alan Grossman – photography
- Austin Hargrave – photography

== Charts ==
Chart performance for Blues for the Modern Daze
Chart (2012)	Peak position
Austrian Albums (Ö3 Austria Top 40)	63
Dutch Albums (MegaCharts)	62
German Albums (Offizielle Top 100)	33
Scottish Albums (OCC)	61
Swedish Albums (Sverigetopplistan)	59
Swiss Albums (Schweizer Hitparade)	96
UK Albums (OCC)	61
UK Independent Albums (OCC)	9
UK Independent Album Breakers (OCC)	1
UK Jazz & Blues Albums (OCC)	1
UK Physical Albums (OCC)	52
UK Record Store Chart (OCC)	31
US Blues Albums (Billboard)	4
US Heatseekers Albums (Billboard)	12
