= Common Ground (Walter Trout album) =

Studio album by Walter Trout
- Released: July 6, 2010
- Recorded: March 8–18, 2010
- Studio: House of Blues Studios (Encino, Los Angeles)
- Genre: Blues rock; electric blues
- Length: 62:57
- Label: Provogue
- Producer: John Porter

Walter Trout chronology
Unspoiled by Progress: 20 Years of Hardcore Blues (2009)	Common Ground (2010)	Blues for the Modern Daze (2012)

Common Ground is the 11th studio album by American blues rock musician Walter Trout. Recorded in March 2010 at House of Blues Studios in Encino, Los Angeles, it was produced by John Porter and released on July 6, 2010, by Provogue Records. Like Trout's previous album The Outsider, which was also produced by Porter, Common Ground features session musicians James "Hutch" Hutchinson (on bass), Kenny Aronoff (on drums) and Jon Cleary (on keyboards) – his regular band members are not featured. The album reached number 6 on the US Billboard Blues Albums chart and number 13 on the UK Jazz & Blues Albums Chart.

== Background ==
Recording for Common Ground took place at House of Blues Studios in Encino, Los Angeles between March 8 and March 18, 2010. The album was produced by John Porter, who had worked on Trout's previous album The Outsider in 2008; also returning were bassist James "Hutch" Hutchinson, drummer Kenny Aronoff and keyboardist Jon Cleary, who performed on the whole album. Regarding the title of the album, Trout explained in a press release that "In this modern world which seems to be so filled with polarization, disagreements, and cruelty, I feel that it is important that we try to find SOME place where we can bond and come together in our common humanity!" Henry Yates of Classic Rock magazine explained that much of the album was written in the context of the 2010 United States elections, noting that "With an election-season America bitterly split along Democrat and Republican battle lines, Common Ground saw Trout appeal for unity using the only tools at his disposal: a whip-smart lyric sheet and the beat-to-hell Fender Strat that positively strafes the tracklisting." Trout himself confirmed this, stating: "These songs were written amidst all the yelling and the screaming from the left and right. It just felt like there was this inability amongst our politicians to be civilised and meet in the middle. That album was really a call for people to be more forgiving to each other."

== Reception ==
=== Commercial ===
Common Ground was Trout's fourth album to reach the top ten of the US Billboard Blues Albums chart, peaking at number 6. In the UK, the album reached number 13 on the UK Jazz & Blues Albums Chart, number 20 on the UK Independent Albums Chart, and number 2 on the UK Independent Album Breakers Chart. The album was also Trout's first solo release to chart in Germany, breaking into the top 100 of the Offizielle Top 100 and peaking at number 98.

=== Critical ===
Professional ratings
Review scores
Source	Rating
AllMusic	3.5/5 stars

Media response to Common Ground was positive. Reviewing the album for AllMusic, William Ruhlmann suggested that "Trout seems to be intent on establishing himself as something more than a worthy successor to an older generation of blues originators, as well as a bevy of their better-known successors all old enough to be his older brothers", praising the quality of the songwriting as well as guitar playing on the collection. Pete Feenstra of Get Ready to Rock! claimed that Common Ground was "a career best" for Trout, suggesting that he "hits new heights" with the team of producer Porter and his backing band of Hutchinson, Aronoff and Cleary.

At the end of 2010, Classic Rock magazine ranked Common Ground as the seventh best blues album of the year, writing that the album "is seldom revelatory, but it reminds you what you liked about [Trout] in the first place: molten Stratocaster solos, superior original material, and a palpable desire to piss on the blues gestapo's rulebook with dips into funk and hard rock". In a feature for the publication in 2024, Henry Yates selected Common Ground as one of Trout's nine best solo albums.

== Track listing ==
All tracks are written by Walter Trout; track 6 co-written by Tim Jahnigen.

Common Ground track listing
No.	Title	Length
1.	"May Be a Fool"	4:45
2.	"Open Book"	4:42
3.	"Her Other Man"	6:33
4.	"Common Ground"	6:18
5.	"Danger Zone"	4:12
6.	"Hudson Had Help"	3:16
7.	"Loaded Gun"	5:45
8.	"Song for My Guitar"	5:13
9.	"Eyes of a Child"	5:09
10.	"No Regrets"	6:23
11.	"Wrapped Up in the Blues"	4:47
12.	"Excess Baggage"	5:54
Total length:		62:57

== Personnel ==
Musicians

- Walter Trout – vocals, guitar, harmonica, mandolin
- James "Hutch" Hutchinson – bass
- Kenny Aronoff – drums
- Jon Cleary – keyboards

Additional personnel

- John Porter – production, mixing, mastering
- Doug Tyo – engineering
- Jon Trout – cover concept, photography
- Misha Van Tol – design

== Charts ==
Chart performance for Common Ground
Chart (2010)	Peak position
German Albums (Offizielle Top 100)	98
UK Independent Albums (OCC)	20
UK Independent Album Breakers (OCC)	2
UK Jazz & Blues Albums (OCC)	13
US Blues Albums (Billboard)	6
