= Live Trout =

Live album by Walter Trout and the Free Radicals
- Released: June 13, 2000
- Recorded: March 26, 2000
- Venue: Tampa Bay Blues Festival (Tampa Bay, Florida)
- Genre: Blues rock; electric blues
- Length: 90:54
- Label: Ruf
- Producer: Jim Gaines

Walter Trout solo chronology
Face the Music (Live on Tour) (2000)	Live Trout (2000)	Go the Distance (2001)

Live Trout is the third solo live album by American blues rock musician Walter Trout, credited to Walter Trout and the Free Radicals. Released on June 13, 2000, by Ruf Records, it features a recording of the group's performance at the Tampa Bay Blues Festival in Tampa Bay, Florida on March 26, 2000, during their tour in promotion of 1999's Livin' Every Day. The album was Trout's first solo release to chart in the United States, reaching number 15 on the Billboard Blues Albums chart.

== Background ==
Live Trout documents Walter Trout and the Free Radicals' performance at Tampa Bay Blues Festival on March 26, 2000. In a review of the album for Blues Revue magazine, Art Tipaldi explained that due to travel difficulties, "this performance almost didn't happen", quoting Trout as recalling that "Two hours before we went on, I was in a restaurant trying to eat and I literally broke down. I had never felt that bad from travelling. I put my head on the table and started sobbing loudly. In 11 years of touring with my own band, I can count on one hand the number of gigs I've ever cancelled, but I was ready to cancel the show." The album was released in the US on June 13, 2000, and in Europe later that month.

== Reception ==
=== Commercial ===
Live Trout was Trout's first solo release to chart in the US, reaching number 15 on the Billboard Blues Albums chart.

=== Critical ===
Professional ratings
Review scores
Source	Rating
AllMusic	3/5 stars

Blues Revue senior writer Art Tipaldi praised Live Trout as a display of "Trout at his very best", writing about the album: "Flailing up and down the fret board with the speed of a comet, Trout makes his guitar beg, plead, moan, yell, laugh, cry, coo, and whisper. He's every guitar head's dream come true. Through it all Trout's mesmerizing energy flies off the CD and Trout's band of Free Radicals prove song after song why they are one of the top blues rockin' bands in the world." Reviewing the album for music website AllMusic, Hal Horowitz awarded Live Trout a rating of three out of five stars, describing it as "Filled with blistering, unrefined, and unadulterated blues-rock".

== Track listing ==
All tracks are written by Walter Trout, except where noted.

Live Trout track listing
No.	Title	Writer(s)	Length
1.	"I Can Tell"		7:31
2.	"Walkin' in the Rain"		5:49
3.	"Say What You Mean"		6:44
4.	"The Reason I'm Gone"	Trout; Jimmy Trapp; Bernard Pershey	11:19
5.	"Come Home"		6:49
6.	"Walter Speaks"		0:49
7.	"Livin' Every Day"		5:02
8.	"Let Me Know"		5:04
9.	"Finally Gotten Over You"		9:47
10.	"Gotta Broken Heart"		8:21
11.	"Walter Speaks Again"		0:37
12.	"I Shall Be Released"	Bob Dylan	7:00
13.	"Serve Me Right to Suffer"	John Lee Hooker	10:57
14.	"Good Enough to Eat"		5:25
Total length:			90:54

== Personnel ==
Walter Trout and the Free Radicals

- Walter Trout – vocals, guitar
- Jimmy Trapp – bass
- Bernard Pershey – drums
- Paul Kallestad – organ

Additional personnel

- Jim Gaines – production, mixing
- Mike Iacopelli – mastering

== Charts ==
Chart performance for Live Trout
Chart (2000)	Peak position
Blues Albums (Billboard)	15
