= Across the Water =

Across the Water may refer to:

- Across the Water (Baby Boy da Prince album), 2007
- Across the Water (Bernard Allison album), 2000
