= Ya Think I'd Know Better =

Studio album by Coco Montoya
- Released: 1996
- Studio: 315 Beale
- Genre: Blues
- Label: Blind Pig
- Producer: Jim Gaines

Coco Montoya chronology
Gotta Mind to Travel (1995)	Ya Think I'd Know Better (1996)	Just Let Go (1997)

Ya Think I'd Know Better is the second album by the American musician Coco Montoya, released in 1996. It peaked at No. 10 on Billboard's Blues Albums chart and was one of the year's best selling independent blues releases. Montoya supported the album with a North American tour. It was nominated for a W. C. Handy Award for best contemporary blues album.

== Production ==
Recorded at 315 Beale, in Memphis, the album was produced by Jim Gaines. Montoya decided to record a more low-key album, forgoing the many guest musicians on his debut. He contributed only one songwriting credit. Lee Roy Parnell played guitar on the title track. "Hiding Place" was written by Warren Haynes. "Dyin' Flu" was written by Albert Collins, Montoya's mentor and former employer. "Fool in Love" is a cover of the Ike Turner song.

== Critical reception ==
Professional ratings
Review scores
Source	Rating
AllMusic	4/5 stars
MusicHound Blues: The Essential Album Guide	4/5 stars
The Penguin Guide to Blues Recordings	3/4 stars

Stereo Review wrote that "Montoya is living proof that you don't have to be from the Deep South to get a grip on the blues." The Wall Street Journal noted the album in its year-end review, praising the Albert King-like "meaty sound." The Ottawa Citizen said that "the fiery intensity of his guitar work is kept in check by a clean and precise vocal delivery." The Lake Geneva Regional News stated that the album "shows off his biting guitar tone" and "shuffling grooves".

AllMusic concluded that "even those familiar with his gutsy, electrifying style will be taken aback by the stylistic variety and musical depth."

== Track listing ==
1. "Monkey See, Monkey Do"
2. "Seven Desires"
3. "Hiding Place"
4. "The Heart of Soul"
5. "Tumbleweed"
6. "Fool in Love"
7. "Can't Get My Ass in Gear"
8. "You'd Think I'd Know Better by Now"
9. "Big Boy Pete"
10. "Too Much of a Good Thing"
11. "Dyin' Flu"
