= Live: No More Fish Jokes =

Live album by the Walter Trout Band
- Released: May 17, 1993
- Recorded: August 10, 1991 at Skanderborg Festival (Skanderborg, Denmark); December 17, 1992 at De Hanehof (Geleen, Netherlands)
- Genre: Blues rock; electric blues
- Length: 71:36
- Label: Provogue
- Producer: Walter Trout; Willie Korman; Charlie Watts

Walter Trout solo chronology
Transition (1992)	Live: No More Fish Jokes (1993)	Tellin' Stories (1994)

Live: No More Fish Jokes is the first solo live album by American blues rock musician Walter Trout, credited to the Walter Trout Band. Released on May 17, 1993, by Provogue Records, it features nine tracks recorded in 1991 at the Skanderborg Festival in Denmark and three recorded in 1992 at De Hanehof in Geleen, Netherlands.

== Reception ==
=== Commercial ===
Live: No More Fish Jokes charted in the Netherlands only, reaching number 63 on the Dutch Albums Chart.

=== Critical ===
Reviewing the 2014 vinyl reissue of the album for Classic Rock magazine, Michael Köhler praised several tracks on Live: No More Fish Jokes, describing "Dust My Broom" as "A brilliant turbo start", praising the performance of the band on "False Alarm", and hailing the "indestructible" finale of "Going Down". Sister publication Blues included the album at number 17 on its list of "23 Greatest Live Albums", with writer Jamie Hailstone calling it "Trout at his very best" and dubbing it his magnum opus.

== Track listing ==
All tracks are written by Walter Trout, except where noted.

Live: No More Fish Jokes track listing
No.	Title	Writer(s)	Length
1.	"Dust My Broom"	Robert Johnson	6:27
2.	"If You Just Try"		7:05
3.	"False Alarm"		5:34
4.	"Life in the Jungle"		6:23
5.	"Girl from the North Country"	Bob Dylan	8:10
6.	"Victor the Cajun"		6:12
7.	"Earrings on the Table"		1:40
8.	"Motivation of Love"		6:26
9.	"Playing with Gloves On"		4:02
10.	"The Love That We Once Knew"		6:28
11.	"Prisoner of a Dream"		6:13
12.	"Going Down"	Don Nix	6:56
Total length:			71:36

== Personnel ==
Walter Trout Band

- Walter Trout – vocals, guitar, production
- Jimmy Trapp – bass
- Frank Cotinola – drums on tracks 1–7, 11 and 12
- Bernard Pershey – drums on tracks 8, 9 and 10
- Danny "Mongo" Abrams – keyboards

Additional personnel

- Charlie Watts – co-production, mixing
- Willie Korman – co-production
- Sven Thornsen – recording on tracks 1–7, 11 and 12
- John Hull – recording on tracks 8, 9 and 10

== Charts ==
Chart performance for Live: No More Fish Jokes
Chart (1993)	Peak position
Dutch Albums (MegaCharts)	63
