= Relentless (Walter Trout album) =

Live album by Walter Trout and the Radicals
- Released: August 12, 2003
- Recorded: May 14, 2003
- Venue: Paradiso (Amsterdam, Netherlands)
- Genre: Blues rock; electric blues
- Length: 72:53
- Label: Ruf
- Producer: Jim Gaines; Walter Trout

Walter Trout solo chronology
Go the Distance (2001)	Relentless (2003)	Deep Trout: The Early Years of Walter Trout (2005)

Relentless is the fourth solo live album and the first official video album by American blues rock musician Walter Trout, credited to Walter Trout and the Radicals. Released on August 12, 2003, by Ruf Records, it features a recording of the group's performance at the Paradiso in Amsterdam, Netherlands, on May 14, 2003. The video version, titled Relentless: The Concert, features additional tracks, including two recorded at a show the night before at the same venue.

== Background ==
In January 2003, Walter Trout and the Radicals announced that they would be recording two performances at the Paradiso on May 13 and 14 for a live album and video release. In an attempt to make the album "more interesting and set it apart from the rest", they opted to perform entirely new material in the set. The album is Trout's first to feature keyboardist Sammy Avila and drummer Joey Pafumi, who joined the band in September 2001 and April 2002, respectively.

Relentless was released between August and September 2003 – on August 12 in the US, August 18 and September 1 in various European territories, September 20 in France, and September 22 in the UK. The video, Relentless: The Concert, was released on November 3 in the Netherlands and December 2 in the US.

== Reception ==
=== Commercial ===
Relentless registered at number 12 on the US Billboard Blues Albums chart, the same position as Trout's 2001 studio album Go the Distance.

=== Critical ===
Professional ratings
Review scores
Source	Rating
AllMusic	2.5/5 stars

Media response to Relentless was mixed. AllMusic contributor Hal Horowitz wrote that the album's production – with "little post-production sweetening or audience intervention" – "results in a successful balance between sonics and concert sparks". He added that "For those who relish his by now standard brand of sturdy, guitar-heavy, Stevie Ray Vaughan-inspired music, Trout is in fine fret-shredding form here. But fans who'd like to see Trout swim in some new waters will find little of that on this outing." Horowitz concluded his review by claiming that "a little of this goes a long way, and 73 minutes is too much for all but the most relentless fans".

== Track listing ==
All tracks are written by Walter Trout, except where noted.

Relentless live album track listing
No.	Title	Writer(s)	Length
1.	"I'm Tired"		6:03
2.	"The Life I Chose"		6:07
3.	"Jericho Road"	W. Trout; Marie B. Trout	4:30
4.	"Work No More"		5:45
5.	"Talk to Ya"	W. Trout; Jimmy Trapp; Joey Pafumi; Sammy Avila	5:32
6.	"Cry If You Want To"		4:45
7.	"Chatroom Girl"		5:33
8.	"My Heart Is True"		6:41
9.	"Lonely Tonight"		2:24
10.	"Helpin' Hand"		5:21
11.	"Collingswood"		4:15
12.	"Empty Eyes"		5:09
13.	"The Best You Got"		6:24
14.	"Mercy"		4:24
Total length:			72:53

Relentless: The Concert video album track listing
No.	Title	Writer(s)	Length
1.	"Dust My Broom"	Robert Johnson; Elmore James
2.	"Reason I'm Gone"
3.	"Talk to Ya"	W. Trout; Trapp; Pafumi; Avila
4.	"I'm Tired"
5.	"Cry If You Want To"
6.	"Helpin' Hand"
7.	"Lonely Tonight"
8.	"The Life I Chose"
9.	"Work No More"
10.	"Jericho Road"	W. Trout; M. Trout
11.	"Chatroom Girl"
12.	"Empty Eyes"
13.	"My Heart Is True"
14.	"Collingswood"
15.	"The Best You Got"
16.	"Mercy"
17.	"It Serves Me Right to Suffer"	John Lee Hooker
18.	"Long Time Love"
19.	"Good Enough to Eat"

== Personnel ==
Walter Trout and the Radicals

- Walter Trout – lead vocals, guitar, production, cover concept
- Jimmy Trapp – bass
- Joey Pafumi – drums
- Sammy Avila – organ, backing vocals

Additional personnel

- Andrew Elt – backing vocals
- Jim Gaines – production, mixing
- Sjoerd Van Den Broek – live engineering
- Paul Schoenmakers – studio engineering
- Brad Blackwood – mastering
- Michael Au – direction
- Valerie Behling – design, layout
- Marie B. Trout – photography, liner notes
- Cor Oldenburg – photography
- Richard Boyles – photography
- Jerry Irving – photography

== Charts ==
Chart performance for Relentless
Chart (2003)	Peak position
Blues Albums (Billboard)	12
