= The Outsider (Walter Trout album) =

Studio album by Walter Trout
- Released: May 26, 2008
- Recorded: February 4–17, 2008
- Studio: Mad Dog Studios (Burbank, California); Cosmo Recording (Boston, Massachusetts)
- Genre: Blues rock; electric blues
- Length: 68:25
- Label: Provogue
- Producer: John Porter

Walter Trout chronology
Hardcore (2007)	The Outsider (2008)	Unspoiled by Progress: 20 Years of Hardcore Blues (2009)

Singles from The Outsider
- 1. "All My Life" Released: 2008

The Outsider is the tenth studio album by American blues rock musician Walter Trout. Recorded in February 2008 at Mad Dog Studios in Burbank, California, it was produced by John Porter and released on May 26, 2008, by Provogue Records. Credited solely to Walter Trout, The Outsider features a range of performers alongside the eponymous vocalist and guitarist, including his bandmates Sammy Avila and Rick Knapp, as well as session contributors Kenny Aronoff and James "Hutch" Hutchinson. The album reached number 3 on the US Billboard Blues Albums chart, number 6 on the UK Jazz & Blues Albums Chart and number 24 on the UK Independent Albums Chart.

== Background ==
After spending several years with Ruf Records, in October 2007 it was announced that Walter Trout had re-signed with Provogue Records (with which he had previously worked throughout much of the 1990s), in the label's first worldwide distribution deal. After completing the Full Circle touring cycle at the end of 2007, Trout and his band announced the addition of drummer Michael Leasure to the lineup in January 2008, replacing Joey Pafumi. Due to the timing of the change in personnel, Trout worked with session drummer Kenny Aronoff for The Outsider, with Leasure appearing as a backing vocalist on two tracks. Bassist Rick Knapp and keyboardist Sammy Avila, the other two members of Walter Trout and the Radicals, are also featured on select tracks, although the majority feature James "Hutch" Hutchinson in place of Knapp.

Recording for The Outsider took place between February 4 and February 17, 2008. Aronoff's drums tracks were recorded within the first four days of sessions. A press release for the album outlined the themes of the album: "As the title implies, The Outsider is a thought-provoking collection of songs that shows [Trout's] true diversity. Often being pegged "too blues for rock" and "too rock for blues", Trout stays true to his belief that genres exists only for the critics." Speaking about whether the record is a concept album, Trout conceded that "I guess so, though it didn't start off that way", agreeing that the songs are about "characters, people, and different eras".

== Reception ==
=== Commercial ===
The Outsider was Trout's second album to reach the top five of the US Billboard Blues Albums chart, peaking at number 3. Outside the US, the album reached number 6 on the UK Jazz & Blues Albums Chart and number 24 on the UK Independent Albums Chart.

=== Critical ===
Professional ratings
Review scores
Source	Rating
AllMusic	4/5 stars

Media response to The Outsider was positive. In a four-star review published by AllMusic, Ronnie D. Lankford Jr. praised the album for its "eclecticism within the blues-rock tradition", which he suggested "shows Trout's range ... [and] prevents one musical style from becoming too dominant". Pete Feenstra of Get Ready to Rock! praised the quality of Trout's songwriting on the album, as well as the sequencing and production, concluding his five-star review by stating that "He may seem himself as an 'outsider' but this album offers further evidence that Walter Trout is very much at the centre of the best blues rock out there." In a retrospective feature titled "The Walter Trout albums you should definitely own" for Classic Rock magazine, Henry Yates selected The Outsider as one of Trout's nine best albums.

== Track listing ==
All tracks are written by Walter Trout; track 13 co-written by Rick Knapp.

The Outsider track listing
No.	Title	Length
1.	"Welcome to the Human Race"	5:56
2.	"The Next Big Thing"	4:29
3.	"All My Life"	4:00
4.	"The Love Song of J. Alfred Bluesrock"	6:15
5.	"Don't Wanna Fall"	5:36
6.	"Child of Another Day"	6:25
7.	"Turn Your Eyes to Heaven"	4:08
8.	"The Restless Age"	4:11
9.	"Gone Too Long"	5:53
10.	"A Matter of the Heart"	5:41
11.	"Can't Have It All"	6:09
12.	"Sanjay"	4:34
13.	"The Outsider"	5:08
Total length:		68:25

== Personnel ==
Musicians

- Walter Trout – lead and backing vocals, (Note: Trout is also credited under the alias "Wally Bass" with performing backing vocals.) electric and acoustic guitars
- Kenny Aronoff – drums (all except track 7), percussion (track 9)
- James "Hutch" Hutchinson – bass (tracks 1–6 and 8–11)
- Sammy Avila – organ (tracks 1, 2, 4, 5, 8, 9, 11 and 13), backing vocals (tracks 3 and 10)
- Skip Edwards – organ (tracks 6 and 10), accordion (track 3), electric piano (track 10)
- Teresa James – backing vocals (tracks 3 and 10)
- Michael Leasure – backing vocals (tracks 3 and 10)
- Jason Ricci – harmonica (track 6)
- Jon Cleary – piano (track 8)
- Rick Knapp – bass (track 13)

Additional personnel

- John Porter – production, mixing, acoustic guitar (track 10), bass and Indian instruments (track 12)
- Eric Corne – engineering, Indian instruments (track 12)
- David Tortolano – engineering (track 6)
- Kevin Taylor – engineering assistance (track 6)
- Stephen Marcussen – mastering
- Misha Van Tol – design
- Jon Trout – photography
- Marie B. Trout – additional photography

== Charts ==
Chart performance for The Outsider
Chart (2008)	Peak position
Dutch Albums (MegaCharts)	81
UK Independent Albums (OCC)	24
UK Jazz & Blues Albums (OCC)	6
US Blues Albums (Billboard)	3
