= Positively Beale St. =

1997 studio album by the Walter Trout Band

Studio album by the Walter Trout Band
- Released: May 19, 1997
- Recorded: February 19 – March 21, 1997
- Studio: 315 Beale St. Recording (Memphis, Tennessee)
- Genre: Blues rock; electric blues
- Length: 71:43
- Label: Provogue
- Producer: Jim Gaines

Walter Trout solo chronology
Breaking the Rules (1995)	Positively Beale St. (1997)	Livin' Every Day (1999)

Singles from Positively Beale St.
- 1. "Let Me Be the One" Released: October 6, 1997; 2. "Got a Broken Heart" Released: 1998

Alternative cover
- Ruf Records Walter Trout cover

Positively Beale St. is the sixth solo studio album by American blues rock musician Walter Trout, the last to be credited to the Walter Trout Band. Recorded between February and March 1997 at 315 Beale St. Recording in Memphis, Tennessee, it was produced by Jim Gaines and released on May 19, 1997, by Provogue Records. The album charted at number 65 on the Dutch Albums Chart and number 9 on the UK Jazz & Blues Albums Chart. Following its initial release in Europe, Positively Beale St. was issued in North America by Ruf Records under the title Walter Trout, credited to Trout as a solo artist.

== Background ==
The Walter Trout Band recorded Positively Beale St. between February 19 and March 21, 1997, at 315 Beale St. Recording in Memphis, Tennessee. The album was produced by Jim Gaines and was reportedly intended as "a tribute to Memphis and its musical legacy". "Let Me Be the One" was released as the sole single from the album on October 6, 1997. After the album was released in Europe by Provogue Records, Trout signed a deal with Ruf Records for a North American release. In early 1998, the album was issued by Ruf under the title Walter Trout, with opening track "Got a Broken Heart" issued as a limited edition "heart-shaped" CD single.

== Reception ==
=== Commercial ===
Positively Beale St. reached number 65 on the Dutch Albums Chart and number 9 on the UK Jazz & Blues Albums Chart.

=== Critical ===
Professional ratings
Review scores
Source	Rating
Uncut	2/5 stars

Media response to Positively Beale St. was positive. In a review of the original European release for Music & Media, Thessa Mooij wrote that the album "clearly shows the depth [Trout's] own material has developed over the years", praising both his guitar playing but also his vocal performance. In a feature titled "The Walter Trout albums you should definitely own" for Classic Rock, Henry Yates suggested that "Positively Beale Street changed everything" for Trout, describing it as "a whistle-stop tour of all Uncle Sam's most seminal genres, from the late-night blues of 'Marie's Mood' to the falsetto-led R&B of 'Song for a Wanderer'".

== Track listing ==
All tracks are written by Walter Trout, except where noted.

Positively Beale St. track listing
No.	Title	Writer(s)	Length
1.	"Got a Broken Heart"		6:08
2.	"Obstacles in My Way"		3:55
3.	"One Way Street"	Trout; Dave Williams; Mick Parker	4:14
4.	"Tender Heart"		3:55
5.	"Come Home"		6:29
6.	"Marie's Mood"		5:42
7.	"Hardtime Blues"		4:07
8.	"In Love with You Again"		4:05
9.	"Don't Worry About It"		3:08
10.	"Song of a Wanderer"		4:40
11.	"Temptation"		4:42
12.	"Walkin' in the Rain"		4:45
13.	"If You Ever Change Your Mind"		3:36
14.	"Jules Well"	Martin Gerschwitz	5:34
15.	"Let Me Be the One"	Williams; Parker	2:38
16.	"Boo"		4:05
Total length:			71:43

== Personnel ==
Walter Trout Band

- Walter Trout – vocals, (Note: Trout is also credited under the alias "Wally Bass" with performing backing vocals.) guitar, harmonica, mandolin
- Jimmy Trapp – bass
- Charles "Rick" Elliot – drums
- Martin Gerschwitz – keyboards

Additional musicians

- William Brown – backing vocals
- Bertram Brown – backing vocals
- Tricia Freeman – backing vocals

Additional personnel

- Jim Gaines – production
- Rusty McFarland – engineering
- Andy Ackland – engineering assistance
- Mike Iacopelli – mastering
- Pieter Aarts – art concept, design
- Paul Roos – art concept, design
- Steve Roberts – photography

== Charts ==
Chart performance for Positively Beale St.
Chart (1997)	Peak position
Dutch Albums (MegaCharts)	65
UK Jazz & Blues Albums (OCC)	9
