= Livin' Every Day =

Studio album by Walter Trout and the Free Radicals
- Released: May 1, 1999
- Studio: Ardent Studios (Memphis, Tennessee)
- Genre: Blues rock; electric blues
- Length: 68:57
- Label: Ruf
- Producer: Jim Gaines

Walter Trout solo chronology
Positively Beale St. (1997)	Livin' Every Day (1999)	Face the Music (Live on Tour) (2000)

Singles from Livin' Every Day
- 1. "Livin' Every Day" Released: 1999

Livin' Every Day is the seventh solo studio album by American blues rock musician Walter Trout, credited to Walter Trout and the Free Radicals. Recorded at Ardent Studios in Memphis, Tennessee, it was produced by Jim Gaines and released on May 1, 1999, by Ruf Records. The album features returning Walter Trout Band members Jimmy Trapp and Bernard Pershey, alongside keyboardist Paul Kallestad who had replaced Martin Gerschwitz in 1998.

== Background ==
After signing with Ruf Records for the North American release of the final Walter Trout Band (WTB) album Positively Beale St. in 1998, Trout recorded his next album under the moniker "Walter Trout and the Free Radicals", retaining Jimmy Trapp on bass and Bernard Pershey on drums (who did not perform on Positively Beale St. due to ill health), and adding new keyboardist Paul Kallestad following the December 1997 departure of Martin Gerschwitz. Recording took place at Ardent Studios in Memphis, Tennessee with returning producer Jim Gaines; Trout recalled about the process that "I had a great time doing it ... The sessions for this album were pretty relaxed, and we were having a lot of fun, and that comes through on the album". Livin' Every Day was released in Europe on May 1, 1999, in the UK on May 10, 1999, and in North America on June 8, 1999.

== Reception ==
=== Commercial ===
Livin' Every Day charted in the UK only, reaching number 24 on the UK Jazz & Blues Albums Chart.

=== Critical ===
Professional ratings
Review scores
Source	Rating
AllMusic	4/5 stars

Media response to Livin' Every Day was positive. AllMusic writer Steve Huey described the album as "another fine outing for rabid blues guitar fans, full of gritty, gutsy playing and well-executed band support". About Trout's songwriting, he commented: "there are a number of tough survivor's tales here that resonate pretty well", but on some tracks "his balladry tries to be sincere yet leans toward sentimentality, which can dissipate the fire of the harder-rocking tracks".

In a review published by the Los Angeles Times, Mike Boehm observed that while his previous albums "showcased the player and the singer in Trout", Livin' Every Day "presents the full package" in terms of songwriting quality, highlighting his "versatility" throughout the record. Boehm's main complaint centred around the running length of the album, as he suggested that "it suffers from the all-too-common more-is-better thinking of the compact-disc era", which results in weaker "filler" tracks such as instrumental "Through the Eyes of Love" and "middling-quality" track "Say What You Mean".

== Track listing ==
All tracks are written by Walter Trout, except where noted.

Livin' Every Day track listing
No.	Title	Writer(s)	Length
1.	"Livin' Every Day"		4:42
2.	"Let Me Know"		4:55
3.	"Playing with a Losin' Hand"		4:17
4.	"Sweet Butterfly (Sophie's Song)"		4:53
5.	"I Thought I Heard the Devil"		4:36
6.	"Through the Eyes of Love"		4:59
7.	"Nothin' but the Blues"		5:19
8.	"City Man"	W. Trout; Bernard Pershey	2:31
9.	"Fool for Love"	W. Trout; Marie B. Trout	5:01
10.	"Say What You Mean"		5:12
11.	"Apparitions"		6:53
12.	"Junkyards in Your Eyes"	W. Trout; Jimmy Trapp; Pershey; Paul Kallestad	4:33
13.	"The Love That We Once Knew"		4:53
14.	"Prisoner of a Dream"		6:13

Notes

- "The Love That We Once Knew" and "Prisoner of a Dream" were originally recorded for Prisoner of a Dream

== Personnel ==
Walter Trout and the Free Radicals

- Walter Trout – vocals, (Note: Trout is also credited under the alias "Wally Bass" with performing backing vocals.) guitar, harmonica
- Jimmy Trapp – bass
- Bernard Pershey – drums, percussion
- Paul Kallestad – organ

Additional musicians

- Ernest Williamson – piano
- Jim Spake – saxophone
- Scott Thompson – trumpet
- William Brown – backing vocals
- Bertram Brown – backing vocals
- Jackie Johnson – backing vocals

Additional personnel

- Jim Gaines – production
- Jason Latshaw – engineering
- Pete Matthews – engineering
- Skidd Mills – engineering
- Mike Iacopelli – mastering

== Charts ==
Chart performance for Livin' Every Day
Chart (1999)	Peak position
UK Jazz & Blues Albums (OCC)	24
