= Tellin' Stories (Walter Trout album) =

Studio album by the Walter Trout Band
- Released: June 28, 1994
- Recorded: August 23 – September 24, 1993
- Studio: Battery Studios (London, England)
- Genre: Blues rock; electric blues
- Length: 74:04
- Label: Silvertone
- Producer: Tony Platt

Walter Trout solo chronology
Live: No More Fish Jokes (1993)	Tellin' Stories (1994)	Breaking the Rules (1995)

Singles from Tellin' Stories
- 1. "Tremble" Released: 1994; 2. "Please Don't Go" Released: 1994

Tellin' Stories is the fourth solo studio album by American blues rock musician Walter Trout, credited to the Walter Trout Band. Recorded between August and September 1993 at Battery Studios in London, England, it was produced by Tony Platt and released on June 28, 1994, as Trout's only album for Silvertone Records. The album reached number 66 on the Dutch Albums Chart, number 84 on the UK Albums Chart and number 4 on the UK Jazz & Blues Albums Chart.

== Background ==
Ahead of recording his fourth solo studio album, Walter Trout signed with American record label Silvertone Records, then part of BMG. This marked his departure for the first time from Dutch label Provogue Records, which had issued his first three studio albums and first live album between 1989 and 1993. Silvertone had initially approached Trout with the intention of signing him to its European label; however, Trout recalled that he replied, "We need a deal in America, because we're doing fine in Europe," with the Los Angeles Times reporting that the deal was signed to "finally give [Trout] a chance to make a name for himself in his own country".

Recording for the Walter Trout Band's first album for Silvertone took place between August 23 and September 24, 1993, at Battery Studios in London. The band's lineup featured returning members Jimmy Trapp on bass and Bernard Pershey on drums, with new keyboardist Martin Gerschwitz taking over from former member Danny "Mongo" Abrams, who had moved to the United States before sessions began. The album was released by Silvertone Records on June 28, 1994.

Tellin' Stories was Trout's only release for Silvertone Records, after which he returned to Provogue. In a review of the album's 1995 follow-up Breaking the Rules, Mike Boehm of the Los Angeles Times wrote that "Last year was supposed to be the year Walter Trout finally made a name in his own country. [...] But Trout's first U.S. release, Tellin' Stories, received virtually no promotion from the blues-oriented Silvertone label, and he had to continue basing his career, as he has since 1989, on his strong reception in the European market." In a 1999 interview, Trout recalled that "I did one album for Silvertone and the reason I went with them cause they said we'll put a record out in America for you if you come with us", adding that "what they did consequently was, they didn't do a very good job for me, either in Europe or America".

== Reception ==
=== Commercial ===
Tellin' Stories reached number 66 on the Dutch Albums Chart – the lowest position of any Walter Trout solo album up to that point. Due to its wider geographical release, the album was also Trout's first to chart in the UK, reaching number 84 on the UK Albums Chart and number 4 on the UK Jazz & Blues Albums Chart.

=== Critical ===
Professional ratings
Review scores
Source	Rating
Los Angeles Times	3/5 stars

Media response to Tellin' Stories was mixed. Music & Media praised Trout's performance on the album, writing: "All tricks we know from his mean live act, Trout uses on this Silvertone label debut. The guitar hero relentlessly spanks the plank, as if he's chased by Jimi's ghost." Hi-Fi World was similarly positive in its review, describing the album as "rousing" and suggesting that it "comes highly recommended for anyone with memories long enough – or record collections wide enough — to encompass the likes of Lynyrd Skynyrd, The Allman Brothers, and George Thorogood and the Destroyers".

Robert Lucas' review for the Los Angeles Times, however, was more critical. Lucas began his review by claiming that "while it isn't his strongest album, it should establish the blues-rocker from Huntington Beach as a leading contender in the guitar-hero sweepstakes". The review highlighted Trout's "excessive style" on the record, with Lucas calling the album "a bit overstuffed" as well as criticising the "flat and cluttered" mixing of the album; however, he praised the album for its "melodic hooks", its variety of styles, and Trout's "hot guitar playing". In a review of the 1995 follow-up Breaking the Rules for the same publication, Mike Boehm claimed that Tellin' Stories was "Trout's weakest record", despite featuring "his customarily volcanic guitar work".

== Track listing ==
All tracks are written by Walter Trout, except where noted.

Tellin' Stories track listing
No.	Title	Writer(s)	Length
1.	"I Can Tell"		6:40
2.	"Tremble"		5:11
3.	"Wanna See the Morning"		5:38
4.	"I Need to Belong to Someone"	Curtis Mayfield	4:42
5.	"Runnin' Blues"		5:34
6.	"On the Rise"		5:59
7.	"Time for Movin' On"		4:23
8.	"Head Hung Down"		6:27
9.	"Please Don't Go"		5:13
10.	"Tellin' Stories"		6:32
11.	"Somebody's Cryin'"	W. Trout; Bernie Marsden; Marie B. Trout	6:23
12.	"Take Care of Yo' Business"	W. Trout; Jimmy Trapp; Bernard Pershey; Martin Gerschwitz	11:22
Total length:			74:04

== Personnel ==
Walter Trout Band

- Walter Trout – vocals, (Note: Trout is also credited under the alias "Wally Bass" with performing backing vocals.) guitar, harmonica
- Jimmy Trapp – bass
- Bernard Pershey – drums, percussion
- Martin Gerschwitz – keyboards

Additional musicians

- Monica Reid-Price – backing vocals
- Ole Onabule – backing vocals
- Bernie Marsden – backing vocals
- Micky Moody – slide guitar on track 6
- The Tingewick Horns – horns on track 6

Additional personnel

- Tony Platt – production, engineering
- Tim Latham – engineering, mixing
- Sarah Bedingham – engineering assistance
- Greig Sangster – engineering assistance

== Charts ==
Chart performance for Tellin' Stories
Chart (1994)	Peak position
Dutch Albums (MegaCharts)	66
UK Albums (OCC)	84
UK Jazz & Blues Albums (OCC)	4
