= Coco Montoya =

American blues guitarist and singer

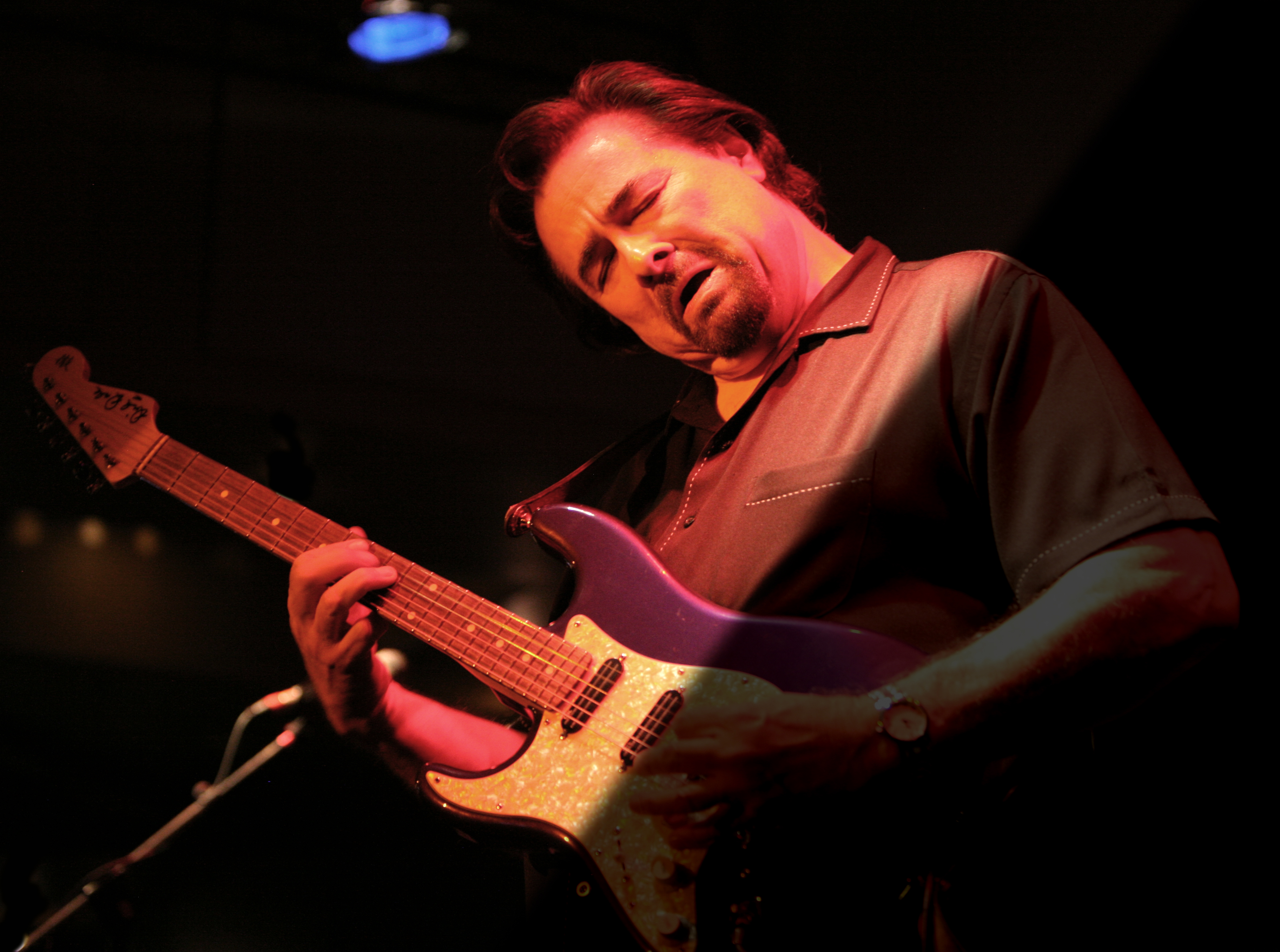
- Coco Montoya – Live in Concert

Background information
- Born: Henry Montoya; October 2, 1951 (age 74); Santa Monica, California, United States
- Genres: Blues, blue-eyed soul, country rock
- Occupations: Musician, songwriter
- Instruments: Vocals; guitar; drums
- Years active: 1977–present
- Website: CocoMontoyaBand.com

Henry "Coco" Montoya (born October 2, 1951, Santa Monica, California) is an American blues guitarist and singer and former member of John Mayall & the Bluesbreakers. He is of Mexican heritage.

== Musical career ==
Montoya's career began in the mid-1970s when Albert Collins asked him to join his band as a drummer. Collins took Montoya under his wing and taught him his "icy hot" guitar style. The two remained friends even after Montoya left Collins' band to start a career of his own.

In the early 1980s John Mayall heard Montoya playing guitar in a Los Angeles bar. Soon after, Mayall asked Montoya to join the newly reformed Bluesbreakers. He remained a member of the band for 10 years.

In 1995 he appeared with the Cate Brothers for the resumption of their recording career on their release, Radioland. Also in 1995, Montoya started his solo career with the release of his debut solo album, Gotta Mind To Travel. To date, he has released twelve solo albums.

In 2002, Montoya featured on the Bo Diddley tribute album Hey Bo Diddley – A Tribute!, performing the song "Pills."

Montoya's 2019 recording, Coming In Hot, was chosen as a 'Favorite Blues Album' by AllMusic.

== Left-hand style ==
Montoya is left-handed but plays a left-handed guitar with a right-handed neck (i.e. strings upside down).

== Personal life ==
Montoya and his longtime girlfriend Lenora married in 2009. He has two daughters: Jasmin (born 1980) and Donna (born 1988).

== Discography ==
- 1995 Gotta Mind To Travel (Silvertone; Blind Pig)
- 1996 Ya Think I'd Know Better (Dixie Frog; Blind Pig)
- 1997 Just Let Go (Blind Pig)
- 2000 Suspicion (Alligator)
- 2002 Can't Look Back (Alligator)
- 2007 Dirty Deal (Alligator)
- 2009 The Essential Coco Montoya (Bling Pig) - compilation
- 2010 I Want It All Back (Ruf)
- 2014 Songs From The Road [live] (Ruf)
- 2017 Hard Truth (Alligator)
- 2019 Coming In Hot (Alligator)
- 2023 Writing On The Wall (Alligator)
