= Life in the Jungle (Walter Trout album) =

Studio album by the Walter Trout Band
- Released: 1989
- Recorded: June 21 – July 9, 1989
- Venue: Midtfyns Festival (Ringe, Denmark)
- Studio: Electra Studios (Stockholm, Sweden)
- Genre: Blues rock; electric blues
- Length: 53:49
- Label: Bozz
- Producer: Erhard Schulz; Thomas Sehringer

Walter Trout solo chronology
Life in the Jungle (1989)	Prisoner of a Dream (1990)

Singles from Life in the Jungle
- 1. "Life in the Jungle" Released: 1991

Life in the Jungle is the first solo album by American blues rock musician Walter Trout, credited to the Walter Trout Band. Recorded in the summer of 1989 following Trout's departure from John Mayall & the Bluesbreakers after four years, it was originally released that year in Scandinavia by Bozz, a sub-division of Swedish record label Electra. A full release across wider Europe followed in 1990, after Trout signed with Dutch record label Provogue Records.

Named after a song by the Bluesbreakers with Trout originally recorded for their seventh studio album Chicago Line in 1988, Life in the Jungle features a mix of studio and live tracks produced between June and July 1989. The studio tracks were recorded at Electra Studios in Stockholm, Sweden with producers Erhard Schulz and Thomas Sehringer, while the live tracks are taken from Trout's band's performance at Midtfyns Festival in Ringe, Denmark on July 2, 1989.

== Background ==
After a four-year stint as one of the band's lead guitarists, Walter Trout left John Mayall & the Bluesbreakers in 1989 to pursue a solo career with his own eponymous group. In a 2015 interview, Trout recalled that "I was touring the world playing big shows with John Mayall ... But when we came home from the tours I still wanted to play. I had the house band in a little bar on the beach and I'd be in there six nights a week ... I got the chance to make my first album, and the guys in that little bar became the Walter Trout Band." The band in question featured bassist Jimmy Trapp, drummer Leroy Larson and keyboardist Danny Abrams.

Trout and his band recorded Life in the Jungle between June 21 and July 9, 1989 – several tracks were recorded in sessions at Stockholm's Electra Studios, while others were live recordings from the band's performance at Danish festival Midtfyns on July 2. The album is primarily made up of original material written by the guitarist, with the exception of cover versions of "Red House" by The Jimi Hendrix Experience, "She's Out There Somewhere" by Buddy Guy, "Cold Cold Feeling" by T-Bone Walker and "Serve Me Right to Suffer" by John Lee Hooker. The album's title track was originally recorded with the Bluesbreakers for Chicago Line.

Life in the Jungle initially received a limited release in Scandinavian countries from Bozz, a sub-division of Swedish record label Electra, in 1989. After the label went defunct, Trout signed with Dutch label Provogue Records in 1990 and the album received a wider European release that year.

== Reception ==
=== Commercial ===
Life in the Jungle charted only in the Netherlands, reaching number 51 on the Dutch Albums Chart.

=== Critical ===
Professional ratings
Review scores
Source	Rating
AllMusic	4/5 stars
Los Angeles Times	4/5 stars

Life in the Jungle received positive reviews from a range of music critics. In a four-star review published by the Los Angeles Times, Mike Boehm enthused that the album "heralds the arrival of a blues-rock talent of the first order", and claimed that it "showcases a performer who is confident, mature and strikingly well rounded". Music & Media proclaimed that "track after track, the album is one continuous proof of Trout's outstanding skills as a blues guitarist, singer and writer", while Music Week called it "an excellent debut" and "a wholly accessible blues album". The Times dubbed it "the greatest album in the history of the blues-rock genre".

In a review for the website AllMusic, William Ruhlmann praised Life in the Jungle for its effective combination of studio and live tracks on one collection, writing: "Albums that combine live and studio tracks can, in some cases, be inconsistent ... But there is nothing inconsistent or uneven about Walter Trout's debut album, Life in the Jungle ... on this release, the blues-rocker is as focused and inspired on-stage as he is in the studio." Awarding the album four out of five stars, Ruhlmann hailed Life in the Jungle as "tough, gritty, rugged, and heartfelt ... the Trout album that blues-rock enthusiasts should be happiest to get their hands on", praising the musician for "going that extra mile on original tunes" as well as producing "passionate versions" of songs originally recorded by other artists.

== Track listing ==
Life in the Jungle track listing
No.	Title	Writer(s)	Length
1.	"Good Enough to Eat"	Walter Trout	4:26
2.	"The Mountain Song"	Trout	3:40
3.	"Life in the Jungle"	Trout	5:44
4.	"Spacefish"	Trout	0:36
5.	"Red House" (live)	Jimi Hendrix	9:51
6.	"She's Out There Somewhere"	Buddy Guy	4:20
7.	"Frederica (I Don't Need You)"	Trout	4:51
8.	"In My Mind"	Trout	4:24
9.	"Cold Cold Feeling" (live)	Jessie Mae Robinson	8:38
10.	"Serve Me Right to Suffer" (live)	Trout; John Lee Hooker	7:19
Total length:			53:49

Notes

- "Life in the Jungle" was originally recorded by John Mayall & the Bluesbreakers
- "Red House" was originally recorded by The Jimi Hendrix Experience
- "She's Out There Somewhere" was originally recorded by Buddy Guy
- "Cold Cold Feeling" was originally recorded by T-Bone Walker
- "Serve Me Right to Suffer" was originally recorded by Percy Mayfield; made popular by John Lee Hooker

== Personnel ==
Walter Trout Band

- Walter Trout – vocals, guitar, harmonica
- Jimmy Trapp – bass
- Leroy Larson – drums
- Danny Abrams – organ, grand piano

Additional personnel

- Erhard Schulz – production, engineering
- Thomas Sehringer – production, engineering
- Gunnar Silins – production assistance

== Charts ==
Chart performance for Life in the Jungle
Chart (1989)	Peak position
Dutch Albums (MegaCharts)	51
