= The Mick Jagger Centre =

Performing arts venue in Dartford, Kent, UK

Coordinates: 51°26′42″N 0°12′20″E

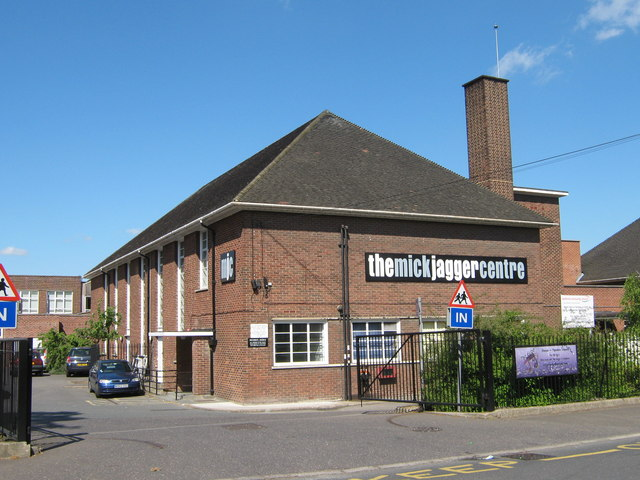
The Mick Jagger Centre in April 2009

The Mick Jagger Centre is a performing arts venue in Dartford, Kent, England, within the grounds of Dartford Grammar School. It is named after the Rolling Stones singer Mick Jagger, who was a pupil at the school. It has two main stages and holds theatre workshops in the summer.

== Facilities ==
There are two main performance spaces, a recording studio, rehearsal rooms, a bar and gallery. The Small Room has a capacity of 150 seated; the Big Room can seat 350 or hold 600 standing.

== History ==
The centre cost £2.25m, and was funded by a National Lottery grant of £1.7m with a further contribution from Jagger himself. Construction on the arena started in 1998 and it was opened in March 2000 by the Duke of Kent and Jagger. At its opening, Jagger was persuaded by a student to sign the wall of one of the new music classrooms with "I was back", which is still displayed today.

== Associated organisations ==
Since it opened, The Mick Jagger Centre has been home to the Dartford Symphony Orchestra, founded in 1946, and is now the venue for all of the orchestra's four concerts throughout the year.

The Mick Jagger Centre is also the home of the Orchestra of the Thames Gateway, a professional orchestra which commissions new works from local composers from the Thames Gateway region. A concerto for saxophone by composer Adrian Smith was premiered in late 2009, followed by a Violin Concerto composed by Sarah Freestone.

The Thames Gateway Quartet, a professional string quartet which plays and records musical works by students, is also based at the centre. The Dartford Music School, which is attached to the centre, organises an annual music competition called the Dartford Young Musician of the Year, open to all young musicians living or attending school in the Borough of Dartford.
