= Across the Water (Bernard Allison album) =

Studio album by Bernard Allison
- Released: 2000
- Genre: Blues, blues rock
- Label: Tone-Cool
- Producer: Jim Gaines

Bernard Allison chronology
Times Are Changing (1998)	Across the Water (2000)	Hang On (2001)

Across the Water is an album by the American musician Bernard Allison, released in 2000. Allison supported the album with a North American tour. It was Allison's second album to be released in the United States.

== Production ==
Recorded in Memphis and Minneapolis, the album was produced by Jim Gaines. Allison felt it was necessary to add rock elements to his music, as blues was becoming less popular with younger Black audiences. "I Just Came Back to Say Goodbye" is a cover of the Colin James song. "Love Is Free" and "Change Your Way of Living" are covers of songs by Allison's father, Luther Allison. "There's No Higher Love" employs a horn section.

== Critical reception ==
Professional ratings
Review scores
Source	Rating
AllMusic	2.5/5 stars
Fort Worth Star-Telegram	3.5/5 stars
Ottawa Citizen	3/5 stars
The Penguin Guide to Blues Recordings	2.5/4 stars
The Press of Atlantic City	3/4 stars

Exclaim! wrote that "Bernard's guitar burns and blisters harder and faster across much of this release and his tone is to die for." Billboard praised "the bluesy Hendrix riffage of the title track." The Hartford Courant said that Allison is "an inventive guitarist, sprinkling crunchy power chords, gritty solos and funky wah-wah lines all over the album."

The Washington Post opined that, "at times, Across the Water sounds like an early-'70s Savoy Brown album with all the lumbering bombast and broad gestures such an analogy implies." The Ottawa Citizen concluded that Allison "seems to be making a grab for the Top-10 ring of pop music success and, for better or worse, he's got too much pure ability and blues chops to make it work." The Fort Worth Star-Telegram determined that "Allison's blues can get generic at times, but far more often he is convincing."

AllMusic wrote that "rock, funk, and straight-ahead blues are all covered with ease."

== Track listing ==
No.	Title	Length
1.	"The River's Rising"
2.	"Meet Me Half Way"
3.	"I Just Came Back to Say Goodbye"
4.	"I Want to Get You Back"
5.	"Love Is Free"
6.	"Coming Back (Across the Water)"
7.	"Change Your Way of Living"
8.	"Feels Kinda Funny"
9.	"Work It Out"
10.	"There's No Higher Love"
11.	"I've Been Down"
