= Transition (Walter Trout album) =

Studio album by the Walter Trout Band
- Released: October 9, 1992
- Recorded: May 12 – June 16, 1992
- Studio: Front Page Recorders (Costa Mesa, California)
- Genre: Blues rock; electric blues
- Length: 47:50
- Label: Provogue
- Producer: Kevin Beamish

Walter Trout solo chronology
Prisoner of a Dream (1990)	Transition (1992)	Live: No More Fish Jokes (1993)

Singles from Transition
- 1. "Running in Place" Released: September 18, 1992; 2. "Motivation of Love" Released: 1992

Transition is the third solo studio album by American blues rock musician Walter Trout, credited to the Walter Trout Band. Recorded between May and June 1992 at Front Page Recorders in Costa Mesa, California, it was produced by Kevin Beamish and released on October 9, 1992, by Provogue Records. The album reached number 46 on the Dutch Albums Chart and was supported by the release of two singles: "Running in Place" and "Motivation of Love".

== Background ==
After recording Life in the Jungle and Prisoner of a Dream in Scandinavia, Walter Trout recorded in the US for the first time for Transition, working at Front Page Recorders in Costa Mesa, California with producer Kevin Beamish, with a budget of around $60,000 – Provogue Records' highest investment in an album up to that point. The album was released in the Netherlands on October 9, 1992, followed by a wider European release on October 26. It was preceded by the singles "Running in Place" on September 18, 1992, and "Motivation of Love" at the end of the year.

== Reception ==
=== Commercial ===
Transition charted in the Netherlands only, peaking at number 46 on the Dutch Albums Chart.

=== Critical ===
Music & Media described Transition as "less bluesy" than both Prisoner of a Dream and Life in the Jungle, noting that "With each album the blues content diminishes". Walter Trout himself has acknowledged this change in retrospect, complaining about "the way the guitars are done" and claiming that the production team "tried to turn me into some insipid pop act. It was like they'd taken away the essence of who I am. That album hurt my career. It was a setback." Classic Rock writer Henry Yates selected Transition as an album "to avoid" in Trout's discography, claiming that "the bone-headed production ... buried the emotional honesty at work beneath a sickly sheen".

== Track listing ==
All tracks are written by Walter Trout; track 10 co-written by Bernard Pershey and Marie B. Trout.

Transition track listing
No.	Title	Length
1.	"Motivation of Love"	5:05
2.	"Endless Variety"	3:34
3.	"Transition"	5:15
4.	"Running in Place"	5:25
5.	"Deeper Shade of Blue"	4:11
6.	"Got to Kill the Monkey"	4:13
7.	"Face the Night"	4:28
8.	"Playing with Gloves On"	4:15
9.	"She's Missing"	6:30
10.	"Fast Moving Traffic"	4:49
Total length:		47:50

== Personnel ==
Walter Trout Band

- Walter Trout – vocals, (Note: Trout is also credited under the alias "Wally Bass" with performing backing vocals on tracks 2 and 4.) guitar, harmonica
- Jimmy Trapp – bass
- Bernard Pershey – drums, percussion
- Danny "Mongo" Abrams – organ, piano

Additional musicians

- Catte Adams – backing vocals (tracks 2 and 4)
- Katrina Perkins – backing vocals (tracks 2 and 4)

Additional personnel

- Kevin Beamish – production, mixing
- Charlie Watts – engineering
- Bill De Smet – art direction, design
- Brian Weiner – art direction, design
- Sahak Ekshian – art direction, design
- Paul Bergen – photography

== Charts ==
Chart performance for Transition
Chart (1992)	Peak position
Dutch Albums (MegaCharts)	46
