= Go the Distance (album) =

Studio album by Walter Trout and the Radicals
- Released: May 22, 2001
- Recorded: February 18 – March 20, 2001
- Studio: Ardent Studios (Memphis, Tennessee)
- Genre: Blues rock; electric blues
- Length: 62:53
- Label: Ruf
- Producer: Jim Gaines

Walter Trout and the Radicals chronology
Live Trout (2000)	Go the Distance (2001)	Relentless (2003)

Singles from Go the Distance
- 1. "Go the Distance" Released: 2001

Go the Distance is the eighth solo studio album by American blues rock musician Walter Trout, credited to Walter Trout and the Radicals. Recorded between February and March 2001 at Ardent Studios in Memphis, Tennessee, it was produced by Jim Gaines and released on May 22, 2001, by Ruf Records.

== Background ==
Recording for Go the Distance took place at Ardent Studios in Memphis, Tennessee between February 18 and March 20, 2001, with Jim Gaines returning as producer. Prior to the sessions, Bill Mason took over from Paul Kallestad as the keyboardist in Trout's backing band, which was renamed The Radicals after Trout discovered that another American group had already registered the name The Free Radicals. The week before the album's release, another lineup change took place as Bernard Pershey left the band after a ten-year stint as its drummer, with Kenny Soule taking his place. Go the Distance was released by Ruf Records on May 22, 2001.

== Reception ==
=== Commercial ===
Go the Distance was Trout's first solo studio release to chart in the US, reaching number 12 on the Billboard Blues Albums chart.

=== Critical ===
Professional ratings
Review scores
Source	Rating
AllMusic	2.5/5 stars

Media response to Go the Distance was mixed. Exclaim! writer John F. Butland praised the album, writing that "You won't do much better when it comes to guitar-centric electric blues-rock", comparing Trout and his band to Stevie Ray Vaughan and Double Trouble. Alex Henderson of AllMusic claimed that "Go the Distance falls short of remarkable, but it's a solid, enjoyable effort that succeeds because Trout is willing to be true to himself", hailing it as "an honest blues-rock/roots rock outing".

== Track listing ==
All tracks are written by Walter Trout; track 12 co-written by Jimmy Trapp, Bernard Pershey and Bill Mason.

Go the Distance track listing
No.	Title	Length
1.	"Love So Deep"	5:09
2.	"Outta Control"	5:08
3.	"Lookin' for the Promised Land"	5:28
4.	"Ride 'Till I'm Satisfied"	4:36
5.	"Go the Distance"	6:09
6.	"Message on the Doorway"	5:38
7.	"Faithful"	4:42
8.	"Down to You"	4:15
9.	"Bugle Billy"	3:56
10.	"Gotta Leave This Town"	6:03
11.	"I Don't Want My MTV"	2:51
12.	"Doin' Just Fine"	5:35
13.	"Always Been a Dreamer"	3:23
Total length:		62:53

== Personnel ==
Walter Trout and the Radicals

- Walter Trout – vocals, guitar
- Jimmy Trapp – bass
- Bernard Pershey – drums
- Bill Mason – organ, keyboards

Additional personnel

- Jim Gaines – production, mixing
- John Hampton – engineering, mixing
- Skidd Mills – engineering
- Bill Bailey – engineering assistance
- Brad Blackwood – mastering
- Marie B. Trout – photography, concept

Additional musicians

- Rick Steff – accordion
- Pat Register – saxophone
- Scott Thompson – trumpet
- William Brown – backing vocals
- Bertram Brown – backing vocals
- James Nelson – backing vocals
- Reba Russell – backing vocals
- Jackie Johnson – backing vocals
- Trisha Freeman – backing vocals

== Charts ==
Chart performance for Go the Distance
Chart (2001)	Peak position
Blues Albums (Billboard)	12
