= Bernard Allison =

American blues guitarist (born 1965)

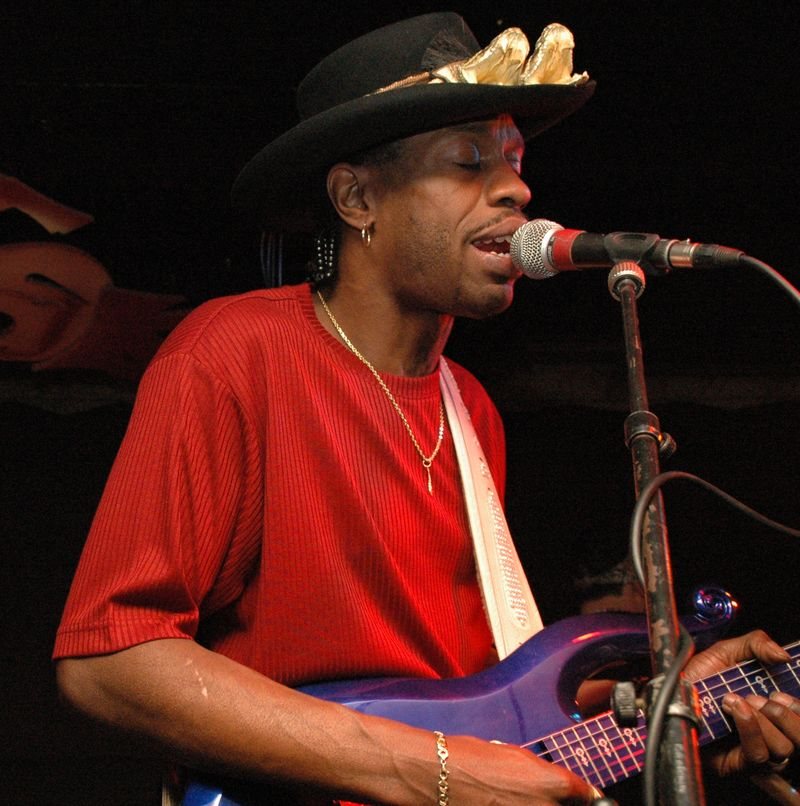

Background information
- Born: November 26, 1965 (age 60); Chicago, Illinois, United States
- Genres: Blues, electric blues, blues rock
- Occupations: Guitarist, singer
- Instruments: Guitar, vocals
- Years active: Early 1980s–present
- Labels: Ruf, several others
- Website: Official website

Bernard Allison (born November 26, 1965) is an American blues guitarist and singer, based in Paris, France.

== Biography ==
Allison was born in Chicago, Illinois, United States. His father, Luther Allison, was a Chicago blues musician. Allison moved back and forth between Illinois and Florida, but remained close to his father's music whether with him or not, listening to his father's albums when they were apart. He accompanied his father to blues festivals in the early 1970s. There he was introduced to Muddy Waters, Hound Dog Taylor and Albert King, amongst others.

Allison taught himself to play in Florida while his father was touring internationally and displayed his early skills to his father when he was 12. His father brought him a Stratocaster guitar but required him to remain in school, although he did allow his son to join him on stage at the age of 18 at the 1983 Chicago Blues Festival. A week after his graduation from high school, he was invited to join Koko Taylor's touring band. During that time, he furthered his skills under the tutelage of Johnny Winter, whom he had met when younger, and Stevie Ray Vaughan whom he met in the first year of his career.

From 1985, he also tried out his headline act, Bernard Allison and Back Talk, largely active in Canada, although he remained with Koko Taylor. He became the bandleader for his father's touring band in Europe late in 1989, and with his father's assistance and the loan of his father's musicians recorded his debut album, The Next Generation, in Paris and Belfaux, Fribourg, Switzerland around Christmas that year. Over the next years, Allison and his father continued to collaborate, with Bernard co-writing and arranging material on his father's final three albums and Luther offering ongoing advice to his son's band.

Allison released three more albums in Europe, Hang On, No Mercy, and Funkifino. In 1997 — the year of his father's death — his critically acclaimed U.S. debut, Keepin' the Blues Alive. was released. The album was followed by a U.S. tour and further releases. Allison's 2002 album Storms of Life charted at number five on the Billboard Top Blues Albums chart. In spite of the success of his tours and albums in the U.S., Allison remains based in Paris.

In 2010, Toby Lee Marshall teamed up with Allison. Marshall was part of Allison's dynamic rhythm section, that toured Europe extensively. Marshall was featured on Allison's 2011 release, Live at the Jazzhaus.

On 16 January 2015, Allison released his thirteenth album, In The Mix.

== Discography ==
- 1990 – The Next Generation (Teldec Recording Service)
- 1994 – No Mercy (In-Akustik)
- 1995 – Funkifino (Ruf Records)
- 1997 – Born With The Blues (Ruf Records)
- 1997 – Keepin the Blues Alive (Cannonball Records)
- 1998 – Times Are Changing (Ruf Records)
- 2000 – Across the Water (Tone-Cool)
- 2001 – Hang On (Ruf Records)
- 2002 – Storms of Life (Tone-Cool)
- 2003 – Kentucky Fried Blues (live album) (Ruf Records)
- 2005 – Higher Power (Ruf Records)
- 2005 – Triple Fret (with Larry McCray, Carl Weathersby and Lucky Peterson) (JSP Records)
- 2006 – Energized – Live in Europe (CD + DVD) (Ruf Records)
- 2007 – Chills & Thrills (Jazzhaus Records)
- 2010 – The Otherside (Jazzhaus Records)
- 2011 – Live at the Jazzhaus (Jazzhaus Records)
- 2015 – In The Mix (Jazzhaus Records)
- 2018 – Let It Go (Ruf Records)
- 2020 – Songs From The Road (Ruf Records)
- 2022 – Highs & Lows (Ruf Records)
- 2024 – Luther's Blues (Ruf Records)
- 2025 – Chills & Thrills (Re-Release) (Ruf Records)

== See also ==
- List of blues-rock performers
