= Midtfyns Festival =

Rock festival in Denmark

Coordinates: 55°13′52″N 10°29′17″E

- Genre: Alternative rock, Pop, Electronic music, Metal
- Dates: 5 days (first weekend in July)
- Locations: Ringe, Denmark
- Years active: 1976 - 2003 2019 -

The Midtfyns Festival is a famous rock festival in Ringe, Denmark. It was closed before the 2004 festival started, due to declining ticket sales. In 2005 Henrik Malmkjær acquired the rights for the festival, planning to revive it in 2006. The plan failed but new actors are now trying to start up the old spirit again. The new Midtfyns Festival was held in 2019. This time the festival will mainly focus on the locals and upcoming artists. In 2020, the festival was cancelled due to the COVID-19 pandemic.

In the festival's heyday it was competing with Roskilde Festival to be the biggest music event in Northern Europe. Musicians like Stevie Ray Vaughan and Whitesnake also performed at Midtfyns.

== See also ==
- List of historic rock festivals
- List of jam band music festivals
