= Prisoner of a Dream =

Studio album by the Walter Trout Band
- Released: 1990
- Studio: Sun Studio (Copenhagen, Denmark)
- Genre: Blues rock; electric blues
- Length: 47:50
- Label: Provogue
- Producer: Dave Anderson

Walter Trout solo chronology
Life in the Jungle (1989)	Prisoner of a Dream (1990)	Transition (1992)

Singles from Prisoner of a Dream
- 1. "Say Goodbye to the Blues" Released: 1990; 2. "The Love That We Once Knew" Released: 1990

Prisoner of a Dream is the second solo studio album by American blues rock musician Walter Trout, credited to the Walter Trout Band. Recorded at Sun Studio in Copenhagen, Denmark with producer Dave Anderson, it was released in 1990 by Provogue Records. The album reached the top 20 of the Dutch Albums Chart and was supported by the release of two singles: "Say Goodbye to the Blues" and "The Love That We Once Knew".

== Background ==
After the staggered release of his solo debut Life in the Jungle, Walter Trout signed a worldwide deal with Dutch record label Provogue Records, who issued the self-financed Prisoner of a Dream in 1990. The album was preceded by the release of "Say Goodbye to the Blues" and "The Love That We Once Knew" as singles, the latter of which reached number 50 on the Dutch Singles Chart. According to Trout, this was the last song recorded for the album.

== Reception ==
=== Commercial ===
Prisoner of a Dream charted in the Netherlands only, peaking at number 20 on the Dutch Albums Chart.

=== Critical ===
Music Week described Prisoner of a Dream as "much more of a mainstream effort" than its predecessor Life in the Jungle, praising it as "Beautifully played [and] impressively sung". Music & Media also described the album as "less blues-oriented" than Life in the Jungle.

== Track listing ==
Prisoner of a Dream track listing
No.	Title	Writer(s)	Length
1.	"Prisoner of a Dream"	Walter Trout	5:44
2.	"The Love That We Once Knew"	Trout	5:04
3.	"Sweet as a Flower"	Trout; Jimmy Trapp	4:20
4.	"Love in Vain"	Robert Johnson	5:57
5.	"Victor the Cajun"	Trout; Trapp; Danny Abrams	4:20
6.	"Girl from the North Country"	Bob Dylan	4:56
7.	"False Alarm"	Trout	4:12
8.	"Say Goodbye to the Blues"	Trout; Tim Jahnigen	7:53
9.	"You're the One"	Trout	3:39
10.	"Earrings on the Table"	Trout	1:45
Total length:			47:50

Prisoner of a Dream CD editions bonus track
No.	Title	Writer(s)	Length
11.	"Tribute to Muddy Waters"	Trout	6:02
Total length:			53:52

== Personnel ==
Walter Trout Band

- Walter Trout – vocals, guitar, mandolin, harmonica, horn arrangements
- Jimmy Trapp – bass
- Danny Abrams – organ, grand piano

Additional personnel

- Dave Anderson – production, mixing (all except track 1), horn arrangements
- Bjarne Hansen – engineering, mixing (track 1)
- Michael Kastrupsen – cover artwork
- Morten Holtum – cover photography
- Robin Skjoldborg – cover photography

Additional musicians

- Klas Anderhell – drums
- Jacob Andersen – percussion
- Bob Ricketts – saxophone
- Jens Haack – saxophone
- Ole Hansen – trumpet
- Kjeld Ipsen – trombone
- Big Ed Bar – backing vocals
- Lise Dandanell – backing vocals
- Michael Elo – backing vocals

== Charts ==
Chart performance for Prisoner of a Dream
Chart (1990)	Peak position
Dutch Albums (MegaCharts)	20
