= Martin Gerschwitz =

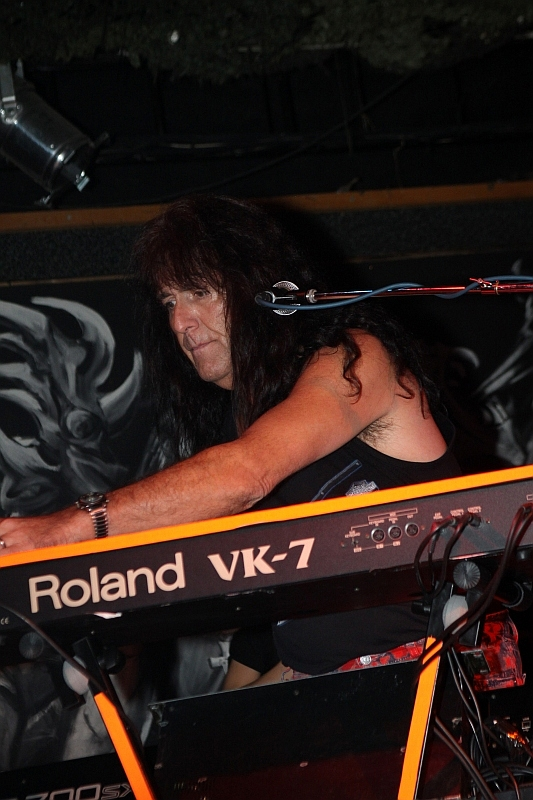
- Martin Gerschwitz with Iron Butterfly in Prague on 7 October 2010

Background information
- Born: 25 June 1952 (age 72); Solingen, Germany
- Genres: Hard rock, progressive rock, heavy metal, arena rock, blues rock
- Occupation(s): Musician, songwriter
- Instrument(s): Keyboards, piano, vocals, violin
- Years active: 1972–present
- Website: martingerschwitz.com

Martin Gerschwitz (born 25 June 1952) is a German violinist, keyboardist, singer and composer.

== Life and career ==
He was born and raised in Solingen, Germany. He began playing piano at the age of five, at the age of twelve he devoted himself exclusively to classical music, in 1969 he founded his first band, the Avengers.

In 1972 he got his first big success: He won the "battle of the bands" in Solingen, where he met Dieter Rubach (amongst other members of the popular heavy metal band Accept), but turned down to play with them as he got the opportunity to play with German entertainer Howard Carpendale, from 1974 to 1977.

In 1978 he founded Break Point, a band playing rock and roll in the USAF Europe Club Circuit, recording an album in 1981.

In 1985, he moved to the United States. From 1987 to 1989 he was the keyboard player for Lita Ford (who amongst others also supported Bon Jovi around that time, where a concert at Wembley Stadium was shot); in 1989 and 1990, he played with Meat Loaf's Neverland Express. In 1991, he played with Vanilla Fudge on the album "Back On Stage", and in 1991 and 1992, he was a permanent member of "The Doughboys/PFR." In 1991 he also played with Kingdom Come. From 1993 to 1998 he played in the Walter Trout Band, where he met drummer Bernie Pershey.

In 1999, he was asked to be the keyboardist for Eric Burdon & the New Animals, after Neal Morse (Spock's Beard) left the band. In late 2001, their drummer Aynsley Dunbar was replaced by his old friend Bernie Pershey. Gerschwitz stayed with Burdon and his new Animals until late 2005 and played on four albums with them.

Since 2005 he has played with the psychedelic rock band Iron Butterfly, both as a singer and keyboardist.

In the 2000s, he formed "Martin Gerschwitz & Friends", including Dieter Rubach on bass, Jan Mengeling on lead guitar and his childhood friend Martin Schwebel on drums. They also recorded a live DVD at the SAE, Frankfurt, in 2004. He continues to play worldwide tours with Iron Butterfly and solo.

== Discography ==
=== Walter Trout ===
- 1993 – Tellin' Stories (Walter Trout Band)
- 1995 – Breakin' The Rules (Walter Trout Band)
- 1997 – Positively Beale Street (Walter Trout Band)
- 1998 – Walter Trout (Walter Trout and the Free Radicals)

=== Eric Burdon ===
- 2000 – The Official Live Bootleg 2000 (Eric Burdon & the Animals)
- 2002 – Live in Seattle (Eric Burdon & the Animals)
- 2004 – My Secret Life (Eric Burdon)
- 2005 – Athens Traffic Live (Eric Burdon & the Animals)

=== Martin Gerschwitz and Friends ===
- 2003 – Martin Gerschwitz & Friends (Martin Gerschwitz & Friends)
- 2007 – Bridge to Eternity (Martin Gerschwitz & Friends)

=== Solo, with MG&F band, and with partners ===
- 1995 – "Classic Melodies Vol. 1" (Dan Martin Band)
- 1996 – "Classic Melodies Vol. 2" (Dan Lefler/Martin Gerschwitz)
- 1997 – "Live" (Dan Lefler/Martin Gerschwitz)
- 1998 – "Classic Melodies Vol. 3" (Dan Lefler/Martin Gerschwitz)
- 1999 – "California Trails" (Double M: Michael Leukel & Martin Gerschwitz)
- 1999 – "Lazy Afternoon" (Martin Gerschwitz)
- 2000 – "Nobody Knows Me" (Martin Gerschwitz)
- 2003 – "Martin Gerschwitz & friends" (Martin Gerschwitz & friends/CD)
- 2005 – "Martin Gerschwitz & friends – LIVE" (Martin Gerschwitz & friends/DVD)
- 2007 – "Somebody Should Know Me By Now" (Martin Gerschwitz)
- 2008 – "Bridge to Eternity" (Martin Gerschwitz & friends/CD)
- 2011 – "Martino's Christmas Music" (Martin Gerschwitz)
- 2012 – "I Only Look Loud" (Martin Gerschwitz)
- 2015 – "Treasures of Life" (Martin Gerschwitz)

=== Others ===
- 1981 – "First Serving" (Break Point)
- 1991 – "Back On Stage" (Vanilla Fudge)
- 1993 – "In Concert At Ohne Filter" (Walter Trout Band/DVD)
- 1993 – "Telling Stories" (Walter Trout Band)
- 1994 – "Last Time It's Gonna Rain" (T. J. Parker Band)
- 1994 – "Happy Hour" (Rhythm Lords)
- 1994 – "Tremble" (Walter Trout Band/Single)
- 1994 – "Please Don't Go" (Walter Trout Band/Single)
- 1995 – "Breaking The Rules" (Walter Trout Band/CD)
- 1995 – "To Begin Again" (Walter Trout Band/Single)
- 1995 – "Breaking The Rules" (Walter Trout Band/Single)
- 1995 – "Positively Live" (Walter Trout Band/DVD)
- 1996 – "Fantasy Is What We Need Today" (Mallet)
- 1996 – "Rhythm Brick" (The Works)
- 1997 – "Waiting For Solace" (Kim Cuda)
- 1997 – "Positively Beale Street" (Walter Trout Band)
- 1997 – "Let Me Be The One" (Walter Trout Band/Single)
- 1997 – "Broken Heart" (Walter Trout Band/Single)
- 1998 – "Walter Trout" (Walter Trout Band/1st US release)
- 1999 – "Live-Bootleg #2" (Eric Burdon & The Animals)
- 2000 – "Live-Bootleg 2000" (Eric Burdon & The Animals)
- 2001 – "Living For The Night" (Hughes Revue)
- 2001 – "Something To Say" (Joshua Perahia)
- 2003 – "My Secret Life" (Eric Burdon)
- 2004 – "Athens Traffic Live" (Eric Burdon & the Animals/DVD)
- 2004 – "Once Upon A Time" (Eric Burdon & the Animals)
- 2005 – "Live In Seattle" (Eric Burdon & the Animals)
- 2014 – "Tribute To The Allman Brothers Band" ("One Way Out", with Robben Ford on guitar, and drummer Artimus Pyle)
- 2015 – "Bill Hayes band"
