= Walter Trout =

American blues guitarist, singer and songwriter (born 1951)

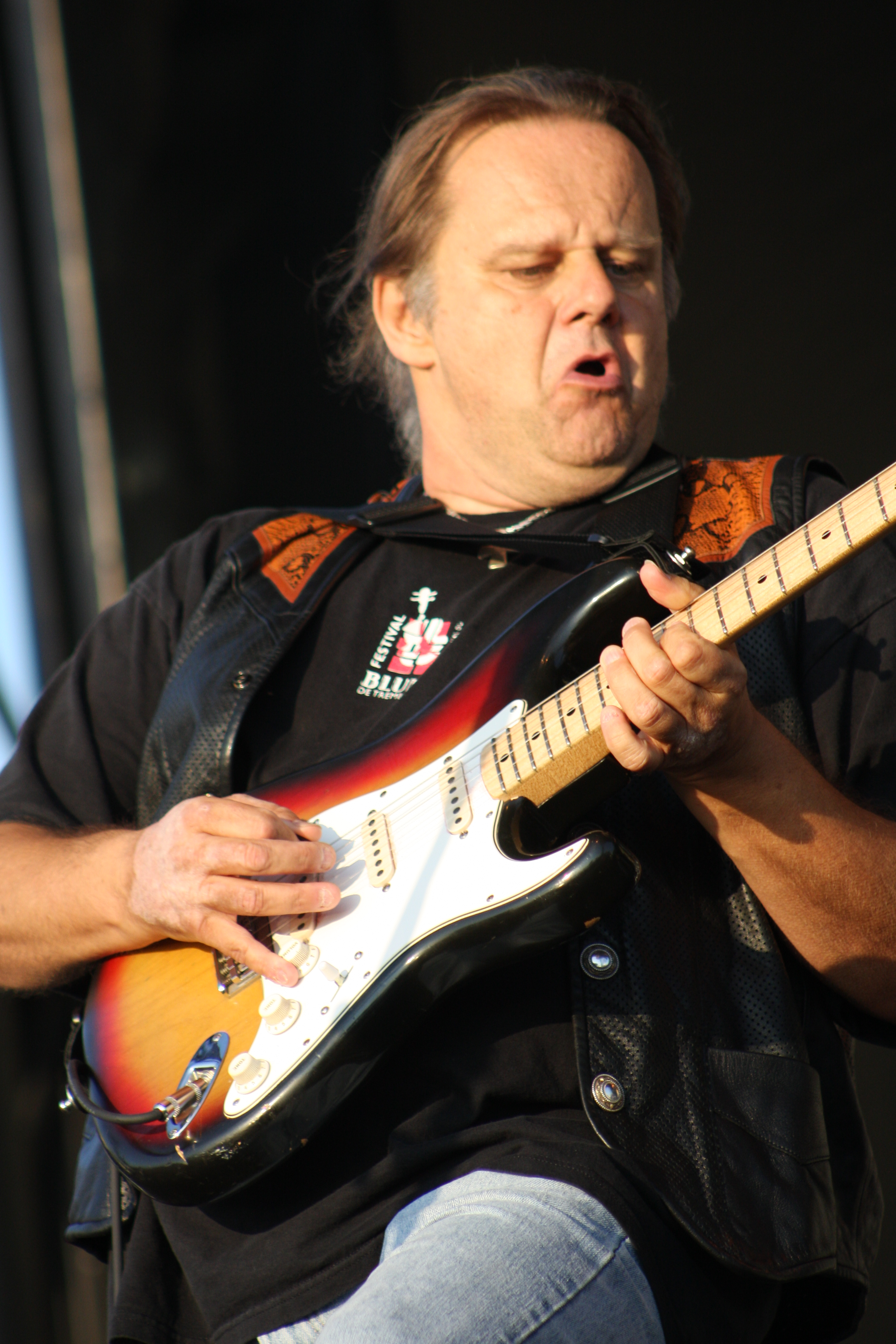
- Trout performing at the Ottawa Bluesfest in 2008

Background information
- Born: March 6, 1951 (age 75); Ocean City, New Jersey, United States
- Genres: Blues, blues rock
- Occupations: Musician, songwriter
- Instruments: Vocals, guitar
- Years active: 1969–present
- Label: Ruf/Platinum/Provogue
- Formerly of: John Mayall's Bluesbreakers; Canned Heat
- Website: www.waltertrout.com

Walter Trout (born March 6, 1951, in Ocean City, New Jersey, United States) is an American blues guitarist, singer and songwriter.

== Biography ==
Trout attended Collingswood High School in Collingswood, New Jersey.

Trout's career began on the Jersey coast scene of the late 1960s and early 1970s. He then decided to relocate to Los Angeles where he became a sideman for John Lee Hooker, Percy Mayfield, Big Mama Thornton, Joe Tex, and many others.

Between 1981 and 1984, he was the lead guitarist in Canned Heat. He toured with them extensively in the US, Europe, and Australia. From 1984 to 1989, he was the lead guitarist in John Mayall's Bluesbreakers following in the footsteps of guitarists such as Peter Green and Eric Clapton. Trout recorded and toured with the Bluesbreakers worldwide. The many successes on stage were accompanied by a self-destructive lifestyle offstage. Trout recalled in a 2018 interview with Blues Radio International that while playing with John Mayall, he was rescued from a complete descent into alcohol and substance abuse by a post-gig encounter with Carlos Santana.

Trout left the Bluesbreakers in 1989 and formed the 'Walter Trout Band' which developed a successful following in Europe, especially Scandinavia where he found himself playing to large festival crowds such as at the Midtfyns Festival and Skanderborg Festival. The Times named Trout's first solo album, Life in the Jungle, "the greatest album in the history of the blues-rock genre." Between 1990 and 1992, Trout's first two albums sold over 100,000 copies.

In 1991, his song, "The Love That We Once Knew" climbed the charts in the Netherlands leading to a Top 10 radio hit. Performances at Park Pop and Pink Pop solidified his status there. When home between tours and until 2005, Trout hosted all-night jams with his celebrity friends in Huntington Beach. Such jams featured Richie Hayward (Little Feat), Jesse Ed Davis, Mick Taylor, John Mayall, Garth Hudson, Billy Gibbons, TM Stevens, Teena Marie, and many more.

In 1994, the official Walter Trout Fan Club for the Netherlands and Belgium was founded, followed in 1996 by the official International Fan Club which had members in 14 countries in Europe, America, Asia and Australia.

In 1998, Trout released his self-titled US debut album and renamed his band 'Walter Trout and the Free Radicals' (later renamed 'Walter Trout and the Radicals' and currently simply 'Walter Trout'). Since, Trout has been recording prolifically and touring in North and Central America, Europe, Australia, and India.

In 2002, he was featured on the Bo Diddley tribute album, Hey Bo Diddley – A Tribute!, performing the song "Road Runner" and many more guest appearances on other recordings.

In June 2013, while touring Germany, Trout got the first signs that he was suffering from cirrhosis. With his health deteriorating, he continued to tour until told he needed a liver transplant within 90 days. Supported by donations from fans, his wife raised the money needed for them to move out of state for lengthy stays in order to qualify for transplantation in various states. Trout recovered from his cirrhosis and subsequent liver transplant in a hospital bed for eight months, during which time he suffered from brain damage, which caused him to lose the ability to speak, play the guitar, and recognize his family. Due to being bedridden, he also lost the use of his legs during this time. He had to relearn how to speak and walk. Trout has also stated that he spent eight hours a day over the course of a year to relearn how to play the guitar. On May 26, 2014, Trout received the lifesaving operation. By 2015, Trout had recovered and was able to go on tour in Europe. His 2015 album, Battle Scars, chronicled his battle with liver failure and the excruciating wait for a donated liver to become available.

Also in 2014, a documentary hosted by Dutch rock journalist TJ Lammers about Trout's life was released to coincide with Trout's album, When the Blues Came Calling. At the same time, a biography, Rescued From Reality, co-written by British music journalist, Henry Yates, was released.

In 2015, Trout had recovered and returned to performing at the Royal Albert Hall in London. He was introduced onstage by his wife.

In November 2015, Trout became a patron of The British Liver Trust to help raise awareness and much-needed funding for the cause. Trout, and his wife, Marie have helped raise awareness for Donate Life Nebraska and are also ambassadors for the Danish Liver Foundation, as well as Organdonation – Ja Tak. "I'm only still here because someone donated their liver" he said.

In 2019, Trout's album, Survivor Blues, debuted with two consecutive weeks on the Billboard Blues Chart at number one and stayed in the top ten for twelve weeks. Metal Zone magazine, reviewed his performance in London by naming Trout "the ultimate, supreme bluesman of the 20th and 21st centuries."

In April 2022, Trout announced the studio album Ride, alongside the lead single "Ghosts". Describing the title, Trout said, "life is kind of a ride too, isn't it? And I want to live mine to the fullest." The album was released on 19 August 2022.

== Personal life ==
In 1990, Trout met a 27-year-old advertising executive, Marie Brændgård during the recording of his second solo album, Prisoner of a Dream, in Denmark. Although married at the time, he pursued her, and convinced her to leave Denmark and move to California. Trout succeeded and filed for divorce. In 1991, they were married in Huntington Beach, California, where the couple still lives. They have three kids together: Jonathan (1993), Biscuit (1996), and Dylan (2001) who now all live in Denmark. Walter and Marie also maintain a residence in Denmark. Marie has managed Trout's career since 1993. Trout and Marie have co-written several songs together, and in 2021 their collaboration on the song "All Out of Tears", a three-way co-write with Teeny Tucker, won the "Song of the Year" Award at the Blues Music Awards in Memphis.

== Discography ==
Solo studio albums

- Life in the Jungle (1989)
- Prisoner of a Dream (1990)
- Transition (1992)
- Tellin' Stories (1994)
- Breaking the Rules (1995)
- Positively Beale St. (1997)
- Livin' Every Day (1999)
- Go the Distance (2001)
- Full Circle (2006)
- The Outsider (2008)
- Common Ground (2010)
- Blues for the Modern Daze (2012)
- Luther's Blues: A Tribute to Luther Allison (2013)
- The Blues Came Callin' (2014)
- Battle Scars (2015)
- We're All in This Together (2017)
- Survivor Blues (2019)
- Ordinary Madness (2020)
- Ride (2022)
- Broken (2024)
- Sign of the Times (2025)

== Polls ==
- Planet Rock: Greatest Blues Artists of All Time: No. 5
- Arrow Classic Rock: No. 1 Best Blues Song in 2012, 2013, 2015, and 2016.
- BBC Listener's Poll: No. 5 (tied with Brian May) Best Guitarist 1993

== Awards ==
Blues Music Awards

- 2016 Song of the Year for "Gonna Live Again"
- 2016 Rock Blues Album of the Year for Battle Scars
- 2018 Rock Blues Album of the Year for We're All In This Together.
- 2021 Song of the Year for "All Out of Tears", co-written with Teeny Tucker and Marie Trout

SENA European Guitar Awards

- Winner of the SENA European Guitar Award 2015

British Blues Awards

- 2013 Overseas Artist of the Year
- 2014 Overseas Artist of the Year
- 2015 Overseas Artist of the Year

Blues Blast Music Awards

- 2016 Blues Rock Album.
- 2017 Live Blues Album.
- 2018 Blues Rock Album and Male Blues Artist of the Year.
