= Provogue Records =

European record label

- Parent company: Mascot Label Group
- Founded: 1991; 34 years ago
- Founder: Jan Van Der Linden
- Genre: Blues, rock
- Country of origin: Netherlands
- Official website: www.mascotlabelgroup.com

Provogue Records is a European record label and part of the Mascot Label Group. Founded by Jan Van Der Linden in the early 1990s, the label specializes in rock and blues. Its catalog includes Gary Moore, Joe Bonamassa, Beth Hart, Eric Johnson, Robert Cray, Gov't Mule, Philip Sayce, and Warren Haynes.

== Roster ==
- Gary Moore
- Bernie Marsden
- Beth Hart
- Eric Johnson
- Gov't Mule
- Innes Sibun
- Jay Hooks
- JJ Grey & MOFRO
- Joe Bonamassa
- Jonny Lang
- Kenny Wayne Shepherd
- Leslie West
- Matt Schofield
- Michael Katon
- Michael Landau
- No Sinner
- Omar Kent Dykes
- Philip Sayce
- Quinn Sullivan
- Rob Tognoni
- The Rides
- Robben Ford
- Robert Cray
- Supersonic Blues Machine
- Walter Trout
- Warren Haynes
