= List of breweries in Florida =

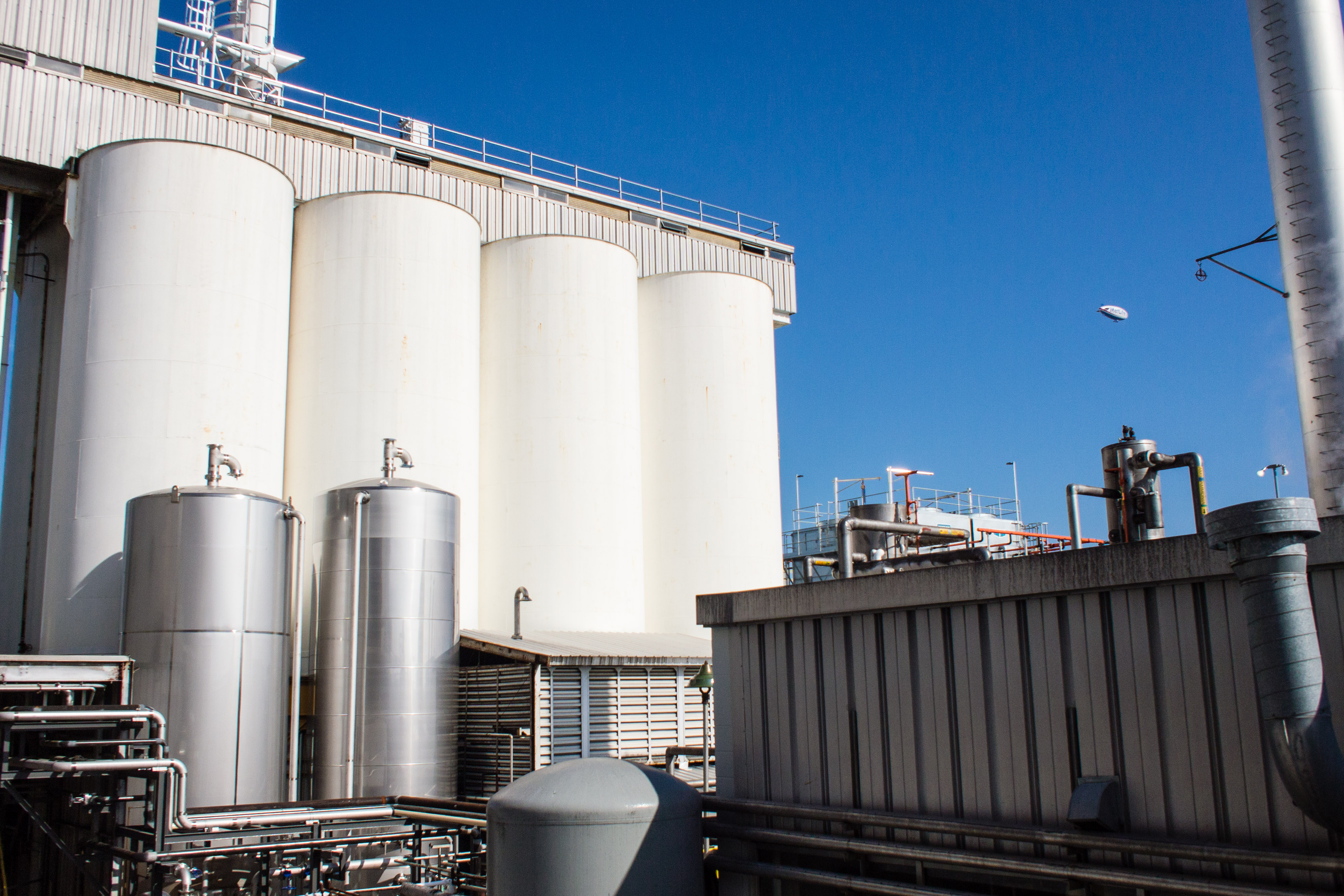
The Yuengling brewery in Tampa, Florida

The U.S. state of Florida is home to over 250 breweries. The state's first brewery, Florida Brewing Company, opened in 1896. The industry was dominated by mid-sized regional breweries until the 1950s, when national macrobreweries came to the fore, and built their own facilities in the state. Since the 1980s, and especially since legal changes in 2001, Florida has become home to many brewpub restaurants and craft breweries.

== Background ==
=== Laws and definitions ===
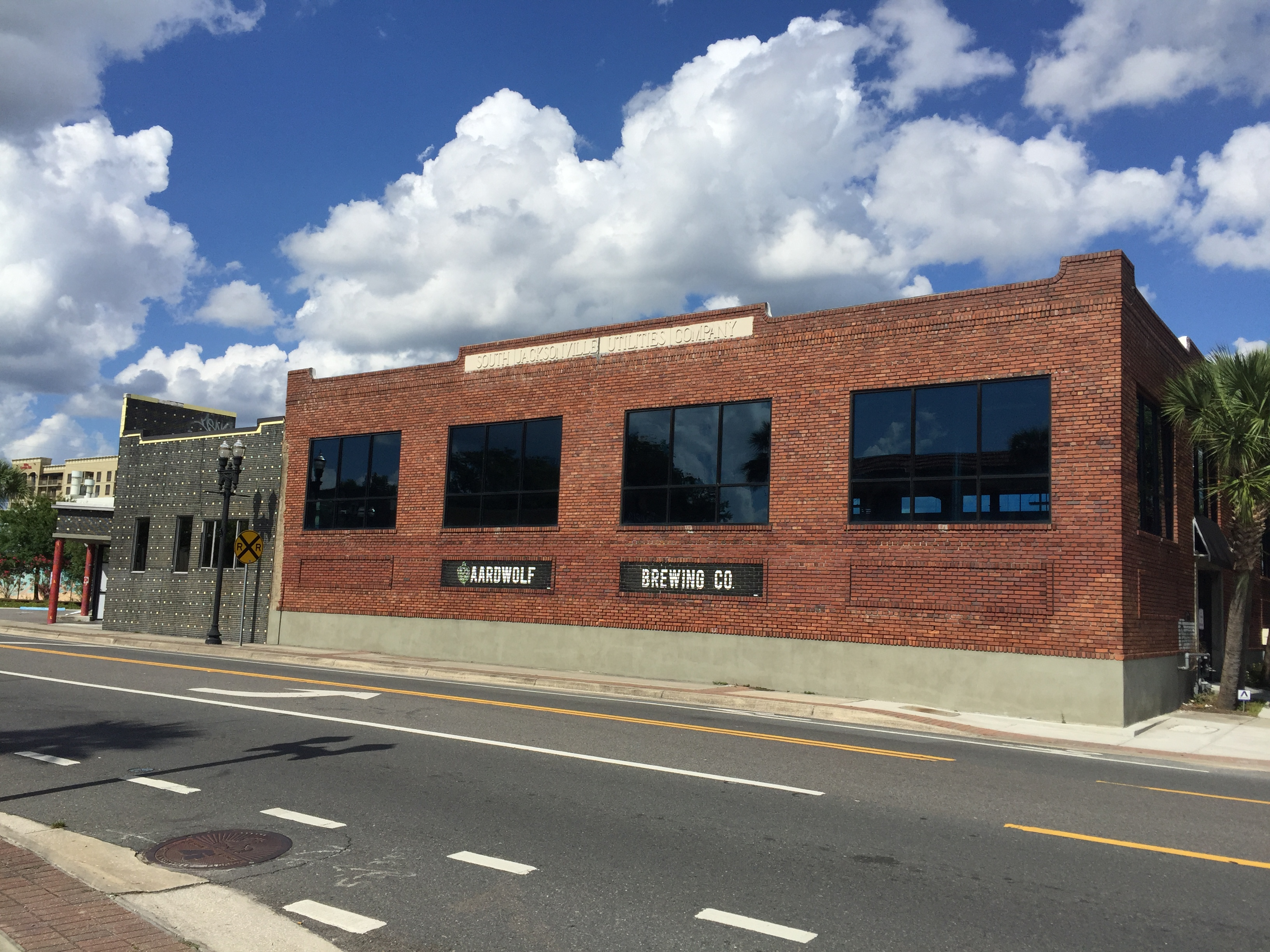
Aardwolf Brewing Company in Jacksonville, Florida

Florida state licensing provides for two types of breweries: brewpubs, or restaurants that produce limited quantities of beer primarily for sale on premises, and production breweries that distribute beer offsite. By state law, Florida production breweries may have on-site taprooms, and some brewpubs also distribute offsite. A three-tiered distribution system governs offsite sales: breweries must sell their beer to a distributor who then sells it to retailers.

The Brewers Association defines several categories of breweries, all of which are present in Florida. Craft breweries are independently-owned breweries producing under 6 million barrels a year using traditional processes; most of these are microbreweries producing under 15,000 barrels a year. Regional breweries produce between 15,000 and 6 million barrels a year. Macrobreweries, also called megabreweries, produce over 6 million barrels a year.

=== History ===
The Florida Brewing Company in Tampa, Florida's first brewery

The earliest brewery in Florida was Tampa's Florida Brewing Company, a regional brewery founded in 1896. Another regional brewery, Jax Brewing Company, opened in 1913 in Jacksonville. Both shifted to other products during Prohibition, and recommenced brewing when it ended. Several additional regional breweries opened in Florida after Prohibition.

From the 1950s, Florida's regional breweries suffered from competition with large-scale national breweries, and all ultimately closed. National companies built their own breweries in the state: Joseph Schlitz Brewing Company built a brewery in 1958 in Tampa, now owned by D. G. Yuengling & Son, while Anheuser-Busch built breweries at Busch Gardens Tampa in 1959 (now closed) and in Jacksonville in 1969.

Brewpubs emerged in Florida during the microbrewery boom of the 1980s and '90s, but growth remained limited by state laws banning non-standard container sizes popular among craft breweries. Governor Jeb Bush signed legislation reducing these restrictions in 2001, and from about 2005 the state saw substantial growth in brewpubs and craft production breweries. According to the Brewers Association, there are 151 craft breweries in Florida as of 2016, 11th most in the United States, but 43rd per capita; these breweries produce 1,207,936 barrels a year and have an annual economic impact of over $2 million.

== Breweries ==
Name	City	County	Opened	Type	Notes	References
3 Daughters Brewing	St. Petersburg	Pinellas	2012	Craft brewery		
3 Keys Brewing & Eatery	Bradenton	Manatee	2016	Brewpub		
3 Sons Brewing Co.	Dania	Broward	2016	Craft brewery		
7venth Sun Brewery	Dunedin(original location); Tampa (2nd location)	Pinellas(original location); Hillsborough (2nd location)	2012 (original location)	Craft brewery		
81Bay Brewing	Tampa	Hillsborough	2016	Craft brewery		
Aardwolf Brewing Company	Jacksonville	Duval	2013	Craft brewery		
Alligator Brewing Company	Gainesville	Alachua	2011	Brewpub	Alligator is the brewing operation of Tall Paul's Brew House.	
American Icon Brewery	Vero Beach	Indian River	2017	Brewpub	Constructed in the historic Vero Beach Diesel Power Plant. Currently under final construction. To open November 2017.	
Ancient City Brewing	St. Augustine	St. Johns	2015	Craft brewery	Opened in the same location as Mile Marker Brewing, which closed in 2014.	
Angry Chair Brewing	Tampa	Hillsborough	2014	Craft brewery		
Anheuser-Busch Brewery	Jacksonville	Duval	1969	Macrobrewery	Owned by Anheuser-Busch Inbev. It is Florida's largest, and oldest continuously operating, brewery.	
Arkane Aleworks	Largo	Pinellas	2016	Craft brewery		
Bangin' Banjo Brewing	Pompano Beach	Broward	2015	Craft brewery		
Barley Mow Brewing Co.	Largo	Pinellas	2011	Craft brewery	Closed 2018, consolidated with The Raven Brewery	
Barrel of Monks Brewing	Boca Raton	Palm Beach	2015	Craft brewery		
BarrieHaus Beer Co	Tampa	Hillsborough	2019	Craft brewery	Lager house in Ybor City.	
Big Bear Brewing Company	Coral Springs	Broward	1997	Brewpub		
Big River Grille & Brewing Works	Lake Buena Vista	Orange	1996	Brewpub	Owned CraftWorks Restaurants & Breweries, and located at Disney's BoardWalk Resort.	
Big Storm Brewing Co.	Odessa (original location); Clearwater (2nd location); Cape Coral (3rd location)	Pasco (original location); Pinellas (2nd location); Lee (3rd location)	2012 (original); 2016 (Clearwater location)	Craft brewery		
Big Top Brewing Company	Sarasota (original location) Gainesville (2nd location) Pensacola (3rd location)	Sarasota (original location) Alachua (2nd location) Escambia (3rd location)	2013 (Original location) 2018 (2nd & 3rd locations)	Craft brewery		
Bog Brewing	St. Augustine	St. Johns	2016	Craft brewery		
Bold City Brewery	Jacksonville (2 locations)	Duval	2008 (original); 2016 (2nd location)	Craft brewery	Jacksonville's first production craft brewery. Its second location, Bold City Downtown, opened in 2016.	
Bone Island Brewing Company	Key West	Monroe	2013	Craft brewery		
Bottlenose Brewing	Jacksonville	Duval	2017	Brewpub		
Brew Bus Brewing	Tampa	Hillsborough	2012	Craft brewery	Also a tour company and former contract brewer, it acquired Florida Avenue Brewing Company in 2015.	
Brewers' Tasting Room	St. Petersburg	Pinellas	2013	Craft brewery		
Brewzzi	Boca Raton	Palm Beach	1997	Brewpub	Formerly had a second location in West Palm Beach.	
Broken Strings Brewery and Black Cauldron Brewing	Orlando	Orange	2016	Craft brewery	Broken Strings and Black Cauldron are two breweries that share a location.	
Bugnutty Brewing Company	Cocoa	Brevard	2013	Craft brewery		
Bury Me Brewing	Fort Myers	Lee	2015	Craft brewery	Originally located inside the Gulf Coast Town Center mall's House of Brewz, now across the street.	
Canopy Roads Brewery	Tallahassee	Leon	2014	Craft brewery		
Calusa Brewing	Sarasota	Sarasota	2013	Craft brewery		
Cape Coral Brewing Company	Cape Coral	Lee	2015	Craft brewery		
Cask & Larder	Winter Park	Orange	2012	Brewpub		
Cayo Hueso Brewing	Key West	Monroe		Craft brewery and brewpub		
Central 28 Beer Company	DeBary	Volusia	2015	Craft brewery		
Charlie & Jake's Brewery Grille	Cocoa Beach	Brevard	1996	Brewpub		
Cigar City Brewing	Tampa	Hillsborough	2009 (original); 2012 (Airport Pub); 2013 (Brewpub)	Craft brewery and brewpubs	Cigar City has two brewpubs, Cigar City Brewpub and Cigar City Airport Pub at Tampa International Airport. The company sold to Fireman Capital Partners in March 2016.	
Civil Society Brewing	Jupiter & West Palm Beach	Palm Beach	2015 & 2019	Craft brewery	Original Location is in Jupiter, FL. A 2nd location opened in West Palm Beach in February 2019	
Clermont Brewing Company	Clermont	Lake	2019	Craft brewery		
Cocoa Beach Brewing Company	Cocoa Beach	Brevard	2009	Craft brewery		
Concrete Beach Brewery	Miami	Miami-Dade	2015	Craft brewery	Owned by Alchemy & Science.	
Copp Winery & Brewery	Crystal River	Citrus	2012	Craft brewery	Copp Winery opened in 2007.	
Copperpoint Brewing Company	Boynton Beach	Palm Beach	2012	Craft brewery		
Coppertail Brewing Company	Tampa	Hillsborough	2013	Craft brewery		
Corporate Ladder Brewing Company	Palmetto	Manatee	2018	Brewery		
Crooked Can Brewing Company	Winter Garden	Orange	2015	Craft brewery		
Crooked Thumb Brewery	Safety Harbor	Pinellas	2015	Craft brewery		
Cycle Brewing	St. Petersburg	Pinellas	2009	Craft brewery	Originally located in Peg's Cantina in Gulfport.	
Darwin Brewing Company	Bradenton	Manatee	2012	Craft brewery	Formerly operated a brewpub in Sarasota.	
De Bine Brewing Co.	St. Petersburg	Pinellas	2016	Craft brewery		
Dead Lizard Brewing Company	Orlando	Orange	2016	Craft brewery		
Deadly Sins Brewing Company	Winter Park	Orange	2016	Craft brewery		
Deep Brewing	Tallahassee	Leon	2017	Craft brewery		
Destin Brewery	Destin	Okaloosa	2015	Craft brewery	Formerly production-only. Tasting room opened 2016.	
Dunedin Brewery	Dunedin	Pinellas	1996	Craft brewery	Oldest production craft brewery in Florida.	
Engine 15 Brewing Company	Jacksonville Beach (original); Jacksonville (2nd location)	Duval	2010 (original); 2013 (2nd location)	Craft brewery and brewpub		
Fat Point Brewing	Punta Gorda	Charlotte	2014	Craft brewery		
First Magnitude Brewing	Gainesville	Alachua	2014	Craft brewery		
Florida Beer Company	Cape Canaveral	Brevard	1997	Craft brewery and contract brewery	Florida's largest craft brewery besides Yuengling, it also provides contract brewing for several other companies. Formerly located in Melbourne.	
Florida Brewery	Auburndale	Polk	1973	Brewery	Previously named Fair Point Brewery, it is currently a subsidiary of Cervecería Polar, and primarily makes Venezuelan brands such as Polar.	
Florida Keys Brewing Co.	Islamorada	Monroe	2015	Craft brewery		
Fort Myers Brewing Company	Fort Myers	Lee	2013	Craft brewery		
Funky Buddha Brewery	Boca Raton (brewpub); Oakland Park (production)	Palm Beach (brewpub); Broward (production)	2010 (brewpub); 2013 (production)	Brewpub and craft brewery		
Golden Horn Brewing Company	Tallahassee	Leon	2012	Craft brewery	Golden Horn is the brewing operation of Fermentation Lounge.	
Grasslands Brewing Company	Tallahassee	Leon	2015	Craft brewery		
Grayton Beer Company	Santa Rosa Beach	Walton	2011	Craft brewery		
Green Bench Brewing Company	St. Petersburg	Pinellas	2011	Craft brewery		
Green Room Brewing Company	Jacksonville Beach	Duval	2013	Craft brewery		
Great Chicago Fire Brewery & Tap Room	Leesburg	Lake	2016	Microbrewery	A Chicago-style hot dog stand with pizza housed in a nano-brewery; opened in 2016.	
Grove Roots Brewing Co.	Winter Haven	Polk	2016	Craft brewery	Winter Haven's first craft brewery.	
Gulf Coast Brewery	Pensacola	Escambia	2016	Craft brewery		
Gulf Stream Brewing	Fort Lauderdale	Broward	2018	Craft brewery		
Hell 'n Blazes Brewing Company	Melbourne	Brevard	2016	Craft brewery		
History Class Brewing Company	Panama City	Bay	2020	Brewpub	Celebrate Bay County's contribution to WWII, the civil rights, and more in this historic building, half history museum/half brewpub.	
Home State Brewing Co.	Winter Garden	Orange	2021	Craft brewery	Florida craft brewery located in the Horizon West neighborhood of Winter Garden. https://www.homestatebrew.com/	
Hourglass Brewery	Longwood	Seminole	2012	Craft brewery		
Hyperion Brewing	Jacksonville	Duval	2017	Craft brewery		
Idyll Hounds Brewing Company	Santa Rosa Beach	Walton	2013	Craft brewery		
If I Brewed the World	St. Petersburg	Pinellas	2016	Craft brewery	St. Pete's most unique craft brewery.	
Intracoastal Brewing Company	Melbourne	Brevard	2013	Craft brewery		
Intuition Ale Works	Jacksonville	Duval	2010	Craft brewery	Florida's first craft brewery to use cans.	
Islamorada Beer Company	Islamorada (original); Fort Pierce (2nd location)	Monroe (original); St. Lucie (2nd location)	2014 (original); 2016 (2nd location)	Craft brewery	The Islamorada location was a contract brewer until the Fort Pierce location opened.	
J. Wakefield Brewing	Miami	Miami-Dade	2014	Craft brewery		
JDub's Brewing Company	Sarasota	Sarasota	2014	Craft brewery		
Karibrew	Fernandina Beach	Nassau	2009	Brewpub	Karibrew is the brewpub operation of Café Karibo.	
Kelly's Caribbean Bar, Grill & Brewery	Key West	Monroe	1992	Brewpub		
Lagerhaus Brewery & Grill	Palm Harbor	Pinellas	2007	Brewpub		
Lake Tribe Brewing Company	Tallahassee	Leon	2016	Craft brewery		
LauderAle	Fort Lauderdale	Broward	2014	Craft brewery	First full-sized craft brewery in Fort Lauderdale	
Mack House	Fort Lauderdale	Broward	2012	Craft brewery	Mack House is the nanobrewery operation and taproom for Holy Mackerel Beers.	
Mad Beach Craft Brewing Company	Madeira Beach	Pinellas	2014	Craft brewery	Affiliated with Florida Winery.	
Marco Island Brewery	Marco Island	Collier	2010	Brewpub		
McGuire's Irish Pub & Brewery	Pensacola (original); Destin (2nd location)	Escambia (original); Okaloosa (2nd location)	1989 (original); 1997 (2nd location)	Brewpub and craft brewery	The original McGuire's opened in 1977 and installed brewing in 1989. It is Florida's oldest brewpub.	
MIA Beer Company	Doral	Miami-Dade	2014	Craft brewery	Production brewery with taproom.	
Miami Brewing Company	Homestead	Miami-Dade	2012	Craft brewery	Part of Schnebly Redland's Winery & Brewery, founded in 2006.	
Momo's Pizza Market Street Brewpub	Tallahassee	Leon	2011	Brewpub		
Motorworks Brewing Company	Bradenton	Manatee	2013	Craft brewery		
Mount Dora Brewing and Rockin' Rabbit Brewery	Mount Dora	Lake	2010	Brewpub		
Naples Beach Brewery	Naples	Collier	2011	Craft brewery		
New Smyrna Beach Brewing Company	New Smyrna Beach	Volusia	2014	Craft brewery		
NOBO Brewing Company	Boynton Beach	Palm Beach	2017	Craft brewery		
Ocean Sun Brewing	Orlando	Orange	2016	Craft brewery		
Orchid Island Brewery	Vero Beach	Indian River	2014	Craft brewery	Indian River County's first craft brewery.	
Organic Brewery	Hollywood	Broward	2011	Craft brewery		
Orlando Brewing	Orlando	Orange	2006	Craft brewery		
Ormond Brewing Company	Ormond	Volusia	2013	Craft brewery	Volusia County's First Craft Brewery	
Pair O Dice Brewing Company	Clearwater	Pinellas	2013	Craft brewery		
Pareidolia Brewing Company	Sebastian	Indian River	2014	Craft brewery		
Pensacola Bay Brewery	Pensacola	Escambia	2010	Craft brewery		
Persimmon Hollow Brewing Company	DeLand	Volusia	2014	Craft brewery		
Pinglehead Brewing Company	Orange Park	Clay	2011	Brewpub and craft brewery	Pinglehead is the brewing operation of Brewer's Pizza.	
Playalinda Brewing Company	Titusville (2 locations)	Brevard	2014 (original); 2016 (Brix Project)	Brewpub and craft brewery		
Point Ybel Brewing Company	Fort Myers	Lee	2013	Craft brewery		
Proof Brewing Company	Tallahassee	Leon	2012	craft brewery	Tallahassee’s First and Largest Independently-Owned Production Brewery	
Props Brewery & Grill	Fort Walton Beach	Okaloosa	2011	Brewpub		
Prosperity Brewers	Boca Raton	Palm Beach	2018	Nano Brewery	Prosperity Brewers is a "nano-brewery" with a tasting room located in East Boca.	
R Bar	Treasure Island	Pinellas	2013	Brewpub		
Ragtime Tavern Seafood & Grill	Atlantic Beach	Duval	1994	Brewpub	Ragtime opened as a restaurant in 1983, and added brewing to become the Jacksonville area's first brewpub in 1994. Currently owned by CraftWorks Restaurants & Breweries.	
Rapp Brewing Company	Seminole	Pinellas	2013	Craft brewery		
Rebel Dog Brewing Co.	New Port Richey	Pasco	2016	Craft brewery and brewpub		
Redlight Redlight Beer Parlour	Orlando	Orange	2014	Craft brewery	Opened as a beer bar in 2006.	
Reprise Brewing	St. Cloud	Osceola	2016	Craft brewery		
RipTide Brewing Company	Naples	Collier	2016	Craft brewery		
River City Brewing Company	Jacksonville	Duval	1993	Brewpub		
Sailfish Brewing Company	Fort Pierce	St. Lucie	2013	Craft brewery		
Saint Somewhere Brewing Company	Tarpon Springs	Pinellas	2006	Craft brewery		
Saltwater Brewing Company	Delray Beach	Palm Beach	2013	Craft brewery		
Sarasota Brewing Company	Sarasota	Sarasota	1989	Brewpub		
Sea Dog Brewing Company	Clearwater and Orlando	Pinellas and Orange	2013	Brewpub	Owned by Sea Dog Brewing Company.	
Seven Bridges Grille & Brewery	Jacksonville	Duval	1999	Brewpub	Owned by CraftWorks Restaurants & Breweries.	
Six Ten Brewing Company	Tampa	Hillsborough	2014	Craft brewery		
Southern Brewing & Winemaking	Tampa	Hillsborough	2011	Craft brewery		
Suncreek Brewery	Clermont	Lake	2018	Craft brewery		
St. Pete Brewing Company	St. Petersburg	Pinellas	2013	Craft brewery		
Tampa Bay Brewing Company	Tampa	Hillsborough	1996	Craft brewery and brewpub	Formerly had a second location in Coral Springs.	
Tampa Beer Works	Tampa	Hillsborough	2013	Craft brewery	ESB Brewing until 2016.	
The Tank Brewing Co.	Miami	Miami-Dade	2016	Craft brewery		
Tequesta Brewing Company	Tequesta	Palm Beach	2011	Craft brewery		
The Abbey Brewing Company	Miami Beach	Miami-Dade	1995	Brewpub	Oldest brewpub in the Miami area.	
Titanic Brewing Company	Coral Gables	Miami-Dade	1999	Brewpub		
Two Henrys Brewing Company	Plant City	Hillsborough	2013	Craft brewery		
Southern Swells Brewing Company	Jacksonville Beach	Duval	2017	Craft brewery		
Swamp Head Brewery	Gainesville	Alachua	2009	Craft brewery		
Ulele Brewery	Tampa	Hillsborough	2013	Brewpub		
Urban Comfort	St. Petersburg	Pinellas	2016	Brewpub		
Veterans United Craft Brewery	Jacksonville	Duval	2014	Craft brewery		
Veza Sur	Wynnwood	Miami-Dade	2017	Crafy Brewery		
Walking Tree Brewery	Vero Beach	Indian River	2016	Craft brewery		
Waterfront Brewery	Key West	Monroe	2015	Craft brewery		
Wicked Barley Brewing Company	Jacksonville	Duval	2016	Craft brewery and brewpub		
Wild Rover Pub and Brewery	Odessa	Pasco	2013	Craft brewery and brewpub		
Wynwood Brewing Company	Miami	Miami-Dade	2013	Craft brewery	Miami's first craft production brewery.	
Ye Olde Brothers Brewery	Navarre	Santa Rosa	2015	Brewpub and craft brewery		
Yuengling Brewery	Tampa	Hillsborough	1999	Regional craft brewery	Owned by D. G. Yuengling & Son. The facility first opened in 1958 as a Joseph Schlitz brewery and changed ownership several times, making Pabst and Stroh's. It is Florida's second largest brewery, and largest craft brewery.	
Zeta Brewing	Jacksonville Beach	Duval	2015	Brewpub	Now named Ruby Beach Brewing after renovations	

=== Closed breweries ===
Name	City	County	Opened	Closed	Type	Notes	References
A1A Aleworks	St. Augustine	St. Johns	1995	2017	Brewpub	Owned by CraftWorks Restaurants & Breweries. The restaurant ended its brewing operations in January 2017, but remains open.	
American Brewing Company (Regal Brewery)	Miami	Miami-Dade	1939	1974	Brewery	The facility opened as Wagner Brewing Company in 1934. It was acquired by the American Brewing Company (New Orleans) in 1939 and was known as Regal Brewery. It was later purchased by Anheuser-Busch in 1958 and The National Brewing Company in 1961 before closing in 1974.	
Anheuser-Busch Brewery	Tampa	Hillsborough	1959	1995	Macrobrewery	Featured Busch Gardens, which evolved into the modern theme park.	
Atlantic Brewing Company	Orlando	Orange	1937	1954	Regional brewery	The Atlantic Brewing Company building later housed Marlin Brewing Company.	
DeSoto Brewing Company	Tampa	Hillsborough	1934	1936	Regional brewery		
Flamingo Brewing Company	Miami	Miami-Dade	1933	1935	Regional brewery	Miami's first brewery.	
Florida Avenue Brewing Company	Tampa	Hillsborough	2010	2015	Craft brewery	Originally Cold Storage Craft Brewery; acquired by Brew Bus ppBrewing.	
Florida Brewing Company	Tampa	Hillsborough	1896	1961	Regional brewery	Florida's first brewery. The name changed to Tampa Florida Brewery in 1933. Its building is a landmark in Tampa's Ybor City neighborhood.	
Gold Top Brewing Company	Hialeah	Miami-Dade	1936	1937	Regional brewery	Succeeded Miami Brewing Company and Hialeah Brewing Company.	
Gould Brewing Company	West Palm Beach	Palm Beach	1936	1938	Regional brewery	Succeeded Sunshine Brewery, later bought by Tuna Brewery.	
Hialeah Brewing Company	Hialeah	Miami-Dade	1934	1934	Regional brewery	Later bought by Miami Brewery and then Gold Top Brewing Company.	
Hops	Clearwater and various locations	Pinellas and various locations	1989	Various	Brewpub chain	Hops grew into the United States' largest brewpub chain, with over 75 locations in the early 2000s. The company subsequently went into bankruptcy and most locations closed.	
Jax Brewing Company	Jacksonville	Duval	1913	1956	Regional brewery	Originally Jacksonville Brewing Company, it was Jacksonville's first brewery. It sold the naming rights to Jackson Brewery when it closed.	
Lagniappe Brewing Company	Minneola	Lake	2009	2014	Craft brewery		
Marlin Brewing Company	Orlando	Orange	1954	1956	Regional brewery	Opened in the former Atlantic Brewing Company facility.	
Miami Brewing Company	Hialeah	Miami-Dade	1934	1936	Regional brewery	Succeeded Hialeah Brewing Company; was later bought by Gold Top Brewing Company.	
Miami Brewing Company	Miami	Miami-Dade	1996	2005	Brewery	Acquired by Florida Beer Company, which continued its brands.	
Mile Marker Brewing	St. Augustine	St. Johns	2011	2014	Craft brewery	Ancient City Brewing opened in the same location in 2015.	
Southend Brewing Company	Jacksonville	Duval	1999	2005	Brewpub	Located at the Jacksonville Landing, it was replaced by the Copper Cellar Grille and Tavern from 2005 to 2007.	
Southern Brewing Company	Tampa	Hillsborough	1934	1963	Regional brewery	Sold to International Breweries in 1959.	
Spearman Brewing Company	Pensacola	Escambia	1933	1964	Regional brewery	Sold to International Breweries in 1959.	
Sunshine Brewery	West Palm Beach	Palm Beach	1934	1936	Regional brewery	Later bought by Gould Brewing Company and then Tuna Brewing Company.	
Three Palms Brewing	Tampa	Hillsborough	2012	2015	Craft brewery		
Tomoka Brewing Company	Ormond Beach (1st location); Port Orange (2nd location)	Volusia	2013 (1st location) 2015 (2nd location)	2019 (1st location) 2022 (2nd location)	Craft brewery	Ormond Beach's first craft brewery. Port Orange location sold to Persimmon Hollow Brewing Company.	
Tuna Brewing Company	West Palm Beach	Palm Beach	1938	1939	Regional brewery	Succeeded Gould Brewing Company and Sunshine Brewery.	
Ybor City Brewing Company	Tampa	Hillsborough	1994	2003	Craft brewery	Tampa's first craft brewery, it was acquired by Florida Beer Company, which continues its brand.	
