= Jackson Brewing Company =

Jackson Brewing Company may refer to:

== Companies ==
- Jackson Brewing Company (New Orleans), former brewing company in New Orleans
- Jackson Brewing Company (San Francisco), former brewing company in San Francisco

== See also ==
- Jax Brewing Company, Jacksonville, Florida
