= Malta Polar =

Malta Polar may refer to:

- Malta Polar, or Maltin Polar, brewed by Empresas Polar in Venezuela and Florida Brewery in the US
- Malta Polar, brewed by Backus and Johnston Brewery in Peru

== See also ==
- Malta (soft drink)
