= Peg's Cantina =

Restaurant in Gulfport, Florida (2004-2015)

Peg's Cantina & Brew Pub
- Type: Private
- Founded: 2004
- Founder: Peg Wesselink and Tony Dodson
- Defunct: 2015
- Headquarters: Gulfport, Florida, United States
- Owner: Peg Wesselink and Tony Dodson
- Website: pegscantina.com

Peg's Cantina and Brew Pub was a bungalow turned into a restaurant in Gulfport, Florida, established in 2004. Peg's was family owned and operated by founders Peg Wesselink and Tony Dodson.

Peg's featured Mexican food prepared mainly with local, seasonal, sustainable ingredients. For example, in the past, the restaurant showcased a farm-to-table menu with food sourced from within a 100-mile radius.

In 2011, Peg's was featured when Rand McNally named Gulfport a finalist in the Best for Food category in their Best of the Road Competition. Peg's was one of three restaurants named in New York Magazine Florida Weekend Escape. Creative Loafing magazine selected them as one of the Top 50 Restaurants in Tampa Bay in 2009.

Peg's Cantina closed in December 2015, ending an 11-year run.

== Craft beer ==
Peg's beer list has been deemed "one of the best beer lists in the Bay area." Ratebeer.com named them as one of the Best Brewpubs in the World.

The head brewer at Peg's is Wesselink's son, Doug Dozark, who interned at Cigar City Brewing in Tampa. Dozark began handcrafting small batches of beer for Peg's in 2009. Dozark and his crew are brewing experimental styles, including barrel-aged stouts and sour ales and traditional styled beer such as India Pale Ales, lagers, amber ales, and porters. Peg's G.O.O.D. beers (short for Gulfport Original on Draft) have won numerous awards. In 2010, Dozark entered three beers in the Best Florida Beer Championship and won 3 medals – gold for his Square Dancing Cody IPA and Gulfport Centennial Stout, and bronze for his Berliner Weiss. In 2012, Peg's Rare D.O.S. American Double/Imperial Stout was rated #10 on Beer Advocate's Top 100 Beers list. Two of Peg's Berliner Weisse made Ratebeer.com's Top 50 Session Beer list in 2010.

Doug Dozark later founded Cycle Brewing in St. Petersburg, Florida.

Peg's has been the host of several inaugural beer events. In conjunction with Tampa Bay Beer Week in March 2012, Peg's showcased their award-winning barrel-aged beers at the first G.O.O.D. (and RARE!) Barrel-Aged Beer Day. In May 2012, Peg's hosted the first Berliner Bash on the Bay, a unique event featuring Florida brewers pouring their original versions of the traditional Berliner Weisse style.

== See also ==
- Barrel-aged beer
