= Hard Times =

Hard Times may refer to:

== Literature ==
- Hard Times (novel), an 1854 novel by Charles Dickens
- Hard Times: An Oral History of the Great Depression, a 1970 book by Studs Terkel

== Film and television ==
- Hard Times (1915 film), a silent British film directed by Thomas Bentley based on Dickens' novel
- Welcome to Hard Times (film), a 1967 American Western film
- Hard Times (1975 film), an American drama starring Charles Bronson
- Hard Times (1988 film) (Tempos Difíceis), a 1988 Portuguese film directed by João Botelho
- Holy Water (film), later re-named Hard Times, a 2009 Irish comedy film
- Hard Times (Canadian TV series), a 1975 Canadian documentary series
- Hard Times (British TV series), a 1977 British series based on Dickens's novel
- "Hard Times" (Good Omens), a 2019 television episode
- "Hard Times", a 2001 episode of Canada: A People's History
- "Hard Times" (The Upper Hand), a 1995 television episode
- The Hard Times of RJ Berger, a 2010 TV series
- NWA Hard Times (est. 2020), a professional wrestling pay-per-view event
- Youth (Hard Times), a 2024 documentary film

== Music ==
=== Albums ===
- Hard Times (Laughing Hyenas album), 1995
- Hard Times (Peter Skellern album), 1975
- Hard Times (Vincent Herring album), 2017
- Hard Times, a Peter Yarrow 1975 album

=== Songs ===
- "Hard Times Come Again No More", or "Hard Times", an 1854 song by Stephen Foster
- "Hard Times" (James Taylor song), 1981
- "Hard Times" (Lacy J. Dalton song), 1980
- "Hard Times" (Paramore song), 2017
- "Hard Times" (Plan B song), 2011
- "Hard Times" (Run-D.M.C. song), 1980
- "Hard Times", by AC/DC from Rock or Bust
- "Hard Times", by Baby Huey from The Baby Huey Story: The Living Legend
- "Hard Times", by Boz Scaggs from Down Two Then Left
- "Hard Times", by Cro-Mags from The Age of Quarrel
- "Hard Times", by David "Fathead" Newman from Fathead
- "Hard Times", by Ethel Cain from Preacher's Daughter
- "Hard Times", by Gillian Welch from The Harrow & the Harvest
- "Hard Times", by The Human League from Fascination!
- "Hard Times", by The Jetzons, later re-used in Sonic the Hedgehog 3
- "Hard Times", by Kiss from Dynasty
- "Hard Times", by Living Colour from The Chair in the Doorway
- "Hard Times", by Patrick Wolf from The Bachelor
- "Hard Times", by Ringo Starr from Bad Boy
- "Hard Times (No One Knows Better Than I)", by Ray Charles from The Genius Sings the Blues

=== Artists ===
- The Hard Times (band), a 1960s American folk rock band

== Other uses ==
- Hard Times Cafe, a restaurant in Minneapolis, Minnesota
- Hard Times Cafe (chain restaurant), a restaurant chain in Virginia, Washington D.C., and Maryland
- Hard Times Plantation, a historic location in Tensas Parish, Louisiana
- Hard Times (Traveller), a 1991 supplement for the role-playing game MegaTraveller
- The Hard Times, a satirical website

== See also ==
- Hard Time (disambiguation)
