= Down 'n Dirty =

2000 film by Fred Williamson

- Directed by: Fred Williamson
- Written by: Aubrey K. Rattan
- Produced by: Fred Williamson; Linda Williamson; Roger Mende
- Starring: Fred Williamson; Bubba Smith; Gary Busey; Tony Lo Bianco; Beverly Johnson; Randy J. Goodwin; David Carradine; Charles Napier; Andrew Divoff; Suzanne von Schaack
- Music by: Johnny Ross
- Distributed by: DEJ Productions; Vivendi Entertainment
- Release date: October 23, 2000
- Running time: 102 minutes
- Country: United States
- Language: English

Down 'n Dirty is a 2000 American action film directed by and starring Fred Williamson as Dakota Smith. It also stars Bubba Smith, Gary Busey, Tony Lo Bianco, Beverly Johnson, Randy J. Goodwin, David Carradine, and Charles Napier.

== Plot ==
Dakota Smith is a tough cop who tries to track down his partner's killers. In the course of Smith's quest to find the killers of his partner, he discovers that the chain goes right up from the lower regions of the police department to city government. Along the way, Smith teams up Nick Gleem, a timid photographer.

== Production ==
The film was produced by Fred Williamson, Linda Williamson and Roger Mende. The soundtrack was created by Johnny Ross. One of the stars in the film, Bubba Smith, had formerly played for the Baltimore Colts and had appeared in the Police Academy films.
