= Brew Bus Brewing =

Brewery based in Tampa Bay, Florida

Brew Bus Brewing is a brewery based in Tampa Bay, Florida. It was founded in 2012 and has five core beer brands that can be found in local craft beer stores, bars, and restaurants throughout the states of Florida, New York, Pennsylvania and Idaho.

The beer is also served complimentary on The Tampa Bay Brew Bus, The Jacksonville Brew Bus, and The South Florida Brew Bus.

== See also ==
- List of breweries in Florida
