= Hard Time =

Hard Time may refer to:

- Hard Time (comics), comic book series written by Steve Gerber and Mary Skrenes and originally published by DC Focus
- "Hard Time" (Mutant X), a 2003 television episode
- "Hard Time" (Star Trek: Deep Space Nine), a 1996 television episode
- "Hard Time", a song by Ratt from Detonator
- "Hard Time", a song by Status Quo from Rockin' All Over the World (album)
- Hard Time (film), a 1998 American crime film
- Hard Time, a 2007 video game created by Mat Dickie

== See also ==
- Hard Times (disambiguation)
