= The Baby Huey Story: The Living Legend =

Studio album by Baby Huey
- Released: February 1971
- Recorded: 1970
- Genre: Psychedelic soul, funk, rock
- Length: 40:59
- Label: Curtom; CRS 8007
- Producer: Curtis Mayfield

The Baby Huey Story: The Living Legend is the only solo album by American soul singer James "Baby Huey" Ramey. He died at the age of 26 while recording his solo debut, and the album was finished and released posthumously. The title refers to the "legend" of Baby Huey that survives after his death.

== Information ==
Ramey came to prominence under the stage name Baby Huey as the vocalist for the group Baby Huey & the Babysitters, which released a string of singles and found success in the Chicago area during the 1960s. Baby Huey was in the midst of recording tracks for his debut album when he died as a result of a heart attack in 1970. Some time lapsed before his manager Marv Stuart, a.k.a. Marv Heiman, and producer/songwriter/musician Curtis Mayfield took what had already been recorded, added some instrumental tracks that had been recorded previously, and managed to gather up enough for the album's release. It is quite likely that some of the tracks feature Curtom Records session men and not the Babysitters since Mayfield wanted to sign Ramey and not the rest of the band. Noteworthy tracks include a "massive psychedelic rendition" of Sam Cooke's "A Change is Gonna Come."

A quarter century after its release, The Baby Huey Story went on to become a cult classic among soul musicians and hip-hop fans. Its single "Hard Times" in particular has been sampled many times, by artists such as Ice Cube, A Tribe Called Quest, and Ghostface Killah, and was covered by John Legend and the Roots in 2010 for the album Wake Up!

== Release information ==
The Baby Huey Story: The Living Legend is the only available album release of Baby Huey. Several singles, including "Beg Me", "Monkey Man", "Messin' with the Kid", and "Just Being Careful", are not included.

=== Original releases ===
- The Baby Huey Story: The Living Legend - Curtom CRS 8007 - 1971 (U.S.)
- The Baby Huey Story: The Living Legend - Buddah 940 060 - 1971 (UK)
- The Baby Huey Story: The Living Legend - Buddah CPF 940 080 - 1971 (France)

=== Track listing for Curtom CRS 8007 ===
==== Side 1 ====
1. "Listen to Me" (Michael Johnson) (6:35)
2. "Mama Get Yourself Together" (James Ramey) (6:10)
3. "A Change Is Going to Come" (Sam Cooke) (9:23)

==== Side 2 ====
1. "Mighty, Mighty" (Curtis Mayfield) (2:45)
2. "Hard Times" (Mayfield) (3:19)
3. "California Dreamin'" (John Phillips, Michelle Phillips) (4:43)
4. "Running" (Mayfield) (3:36)
5. "One Dragon Two Dragon" (Ramey) (4:02)

=== Reissues ===
- The Baby Huey Story: The Living Legend - Image Records (Unidisc) AGE - 2003 - 1987 (LP)
- The Baby Huey Story - Sequel Records NEMLP 405 - 1999 (LP)
- The Baby Huey Story: The Living Legend -Unidisc AGEK 2003 - 1999
- The Baby Huey Story - Sequel NEBCD 405 - 1999 (CD)
- The Baby Huey Story: The Living Legend - Water 142 - 2004 (CD)

=== Track listing for Sequel NEBCD 405 ===
1. "Listen to Me" (Johnson) (6:40)
2. "Mama Get Yourself Together" (Ramey) (6:12)
3. "A Change Is Gonna Come" (Cooke) (9:25)
4. "Mighty Mighty Children, Pt. 2" (Mayfield) (2:47)
5. "Hard Times" (Mayfield) (3:21)
6. "California Dreamin'" (Phillips, Phillips) (4:47)
7. "Running" (Mayfield) (3:38)
8. "One Dragon Two Dragon" (Ramey) (4:06)
9. "Mighty Mighty Children, Pt. 1" (Mayfield) (2:28)
10. "Running" [Mono Mix] (Mayfield) (2:52)
11. "Hard Times" [Mono Mix] (Mayfield) (3:20)
