= Johnny Ross (musician) =

- Born: John W. Ross Jr; May 28, 1942; Miller, Indiana, United States
- Died: February 9, 2006 (aged 63) Hobart, Indiana, United States
- Genres: Soul, R&B, blues
- Occupation: Singer
- Instrument: Vocals
- Years active: c.1960 – 2006

Johnny Ross (May 28, 1942 – February 9, 2006) was an American multi-instrumentalist, singer-songwriter and founding member of Baby Huey & the Babysitters, who died in 2006 as a result of appendicitis. He also hosted his own cable television show.

== Biography ==
John W. Ross Jr was born in Miller, Indiana, United States. Along with Melvyn "Deacon" Jones and James Ramey a.k.a. Baby Huey, Ross was a founding member of Baby Huey & the Babysitters. He stayed with the Babysitters for nearly a decade and during that time he wrote two of their songs, "Monkey Man" and "Just Being Careful". "Monkey Man" appears on numerous 1960s various artists compilations including Pittsburghs Greatest Hits, Teenage Shutdown: Jump, Jive and Harmonize, Mad Mike's Monstors Vol 3

After he left the Babysitters he went solo and recorded some soul singles including, "I Can't Help Myself", which appeared on a Northern soul dance compilation.

=== In later years ===
From the early 1990s until the time of his death Ross and his wife managed Ross Music and Video Productions. He scored music for television shows and commercials for brands such as Sears and Mattel toys.

He had a cable television show Creating Music that ran for ten years. Among the guests were Mo' Beat Blues, members of Michael Jackson's extended family, Gary Mayor Scott King who played bass, and members of The Spaniels.

From the early 2000s he composed movie soundtracks including two for Fred "The Hammer" Williamson. They were Down 'n Dirty and On The Edge.

Ross also managed security for many municipal events and personally handled security for Coretta Scott King, the widow of Rev. Dr. Martin Luther King Jr.

=== Death ===
He died on February 9, 2006, as a result of heart failure after appendicitis, at the age of 63.

== Television ==
- The Johnny Ross Show, Creating Music – (c) 1994 – 2006 (Cable)

== Soundtrack ==
- Down 'n Dirty – 2000
- On The Edge – 2002

== Discography ==
=== Singles ===
- Johnny Ross & The Soul Explosions – "I Can't Help Myself" / "Sore Loser" – Chirrup 1523
- Electric City Featuring Johnny Ross – "Gemini" / "We're Gonna Make It" – 20th Century Fox TC-2360 (1977)

=== Compilation albums ===
- Northern Soul Story 4 – Soul Supply Records LPSD 121 – 1987 – Johnny Ross & The Soul Explosions – I Can't Help Myself (2 LP)
- Northern Soul Dance Party Goldmine GSCD46 – Johnny Ross & the Soul Explosion – "I Can't Help Myself"
- Down 'n Dirty (Soundtrack) – Select-O-Hits – 2000
