= Melvyn "Deacon" Jones =

- Born: December 12, 1943; Richmond, Indiana, U.S.
- Died: July 6, 2017 (aged 73) Hollywood, California, U.S.
- Genres: Soul, R&B, blues
- Occupation: Musician
- Years active: c.1960 – 2017

Melvyn "Deacon" Jones (December 12, 1943 – July 6, 2017) was an American trumpet player and an organist and founding member of Baby Huey & the Babysitters.

== Biography ==
In 1963, along with Johnny Ross and Jimmy Ramey, Jones formed Baby Huey & the Babysitters who went on to become a well known live attraction in Chicago. After Ramey's death in 1970, Jones embarked on a career that would see him work with Curtis Mayfield, Freddie King, and John Lee Hooker. During his career he worked with many noted musicians, including Gregg Allman, Elvin Bishop, Lester Chambers, Otis Clay, Albert Collins, Buddy Miles, and Pappo. His brother is the drummer Harold Jones. He is survived by his son, Jason Christopher Jones and daughter Sarah Lee Grace Jones. In 2008, his autobiography The Blues Man: 40 Years with the Blues Legends was published.

== 1990s onwards ==
In 1992, the Bay Area Blues Society and the South Bay Blues Awards named Jones, "Keyboard Player of the Year".

In 2008, Jones published his autobiography, The Blues Man: 40 Years with the Blues Legends.

== Death ==
Jones died on July 6, 2017, at the age of 73 in Hollywood, California.

== Discography ==
- Let's Talk About The Blues (Blue Rock'it Records, 1987 – LP)
- Let's Talk About The Blues (reissue: Nile Lotus Productions, 2002 – CD) [UPC: 634479396724]
- Let's Talk About The Blues (D7 Sounds LLC, 2015 – digital download)
- Makin' Blues History – Vol. 1 (BDC Records, 1997 – CD)
- Makin Blues History (reissue: Nile Lotus Productions, 2002 – CD) [UPC: 634479396823]
- Makin' Blues History (D7 Sounds LLC, 2015 – digital download)
- Jonesen For Money (Nile Lotus Productions, 2002 – CD) [UPC: 634479405426]
- Jonesin' For Money (reissue: Kent Music/Kent Entertainment Group, 2006 – CD) [UPC: 754387884523]
- Jonesin' For Money (D7 Sounds LLC, 2015 – digital download)

With Baby Huey & the Babysitters

- The Baby Huey Story – The Living Legend (Curtom, 1971)

With Otis Clay

- The Only Way Is Up (Victor [Japan], 1982; Blues R&B Recording, 1985; Waylo, 1989)

With John Lee Hooker

- Jealous (Pausa, 1982 [1986])
- Mr. Lucky (Pointblank, 1991)
- Boom Boom (Pointblank, 1992)
- Chill Out (Pointblank, 1995)
- John Lee Hooker and the Coast to Coast Blues Band – Live at Montreux 1983 & 1990 (Eagle, 2020) 2-LP

With Freddie King

- Freddie King (1934–1976) (RSO, 1977)
- Rockin' the Blues – Live! (CrossCut, 1974/1975 [1983])
- Texas Flyer (1974–1976) (Bear Family, 1974/1975 [2010]) 5-CD box set
- Blues Journey (Sunset Blvd Records, 1974/1975 [2020]) 3-CD set

With Pappo

- Pappo with Deacon Jones – July '93 Los Angeles (DBN/Distribuidora Belgrano Norte [Argentina], 1994)
- Pappo's Blues, Volumen 8 – Caso Cerrado (Main Records [Argentina], 1995)

With Walter Trout

- Full Circle (Ruf, 2006)
