= Jackson Brewing Company (New Orleans) =

Regional brewing company in New Orleans

Coordinates: 29.9561°N 90.0633°W

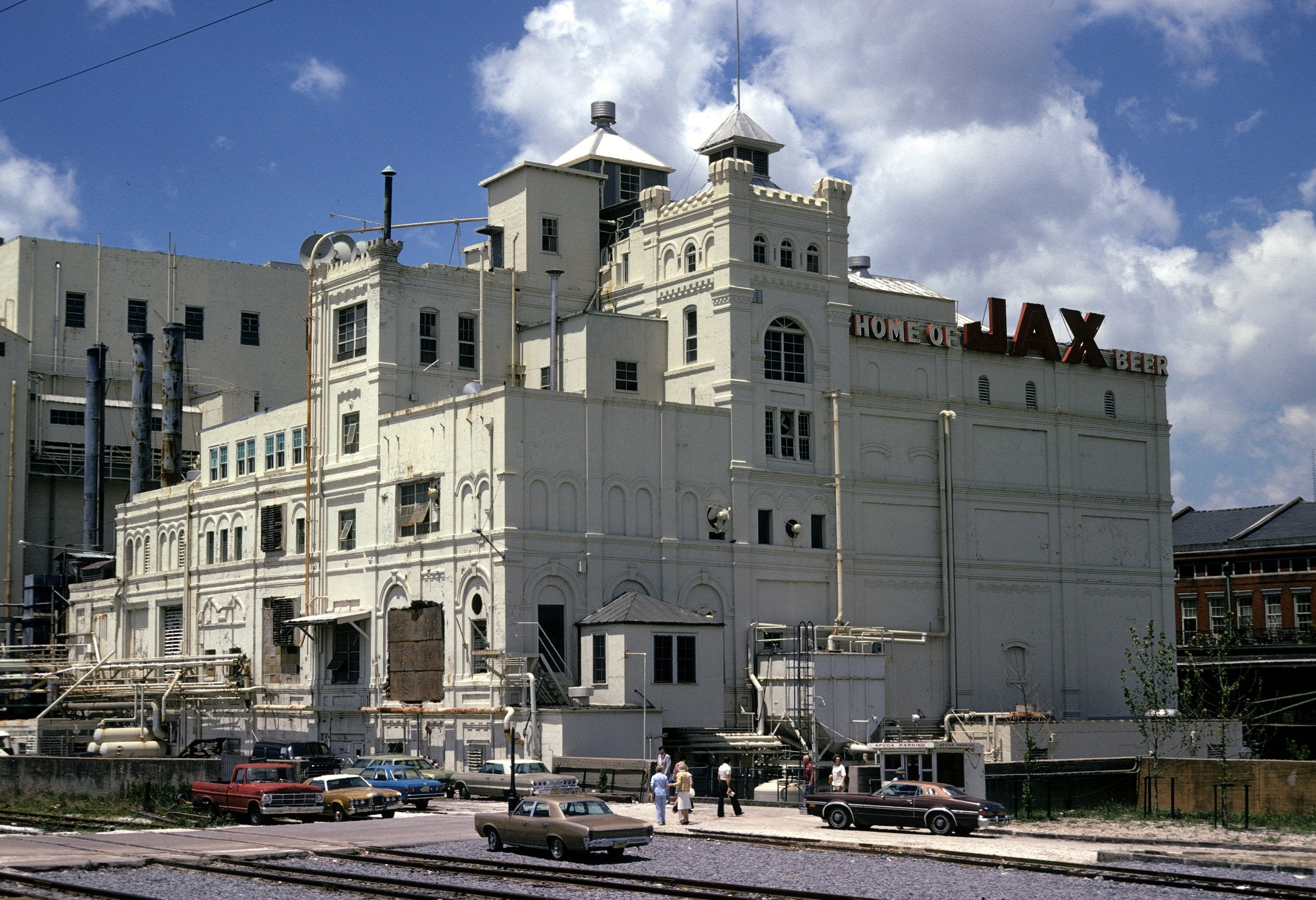
- Jackson Brewery, 1976
- Industry: Alcoholic beverage
- Founded: 1890
- Defunct: 1974
- Headquarters: New Orleans, Louisiana, USA
- Products: Beer

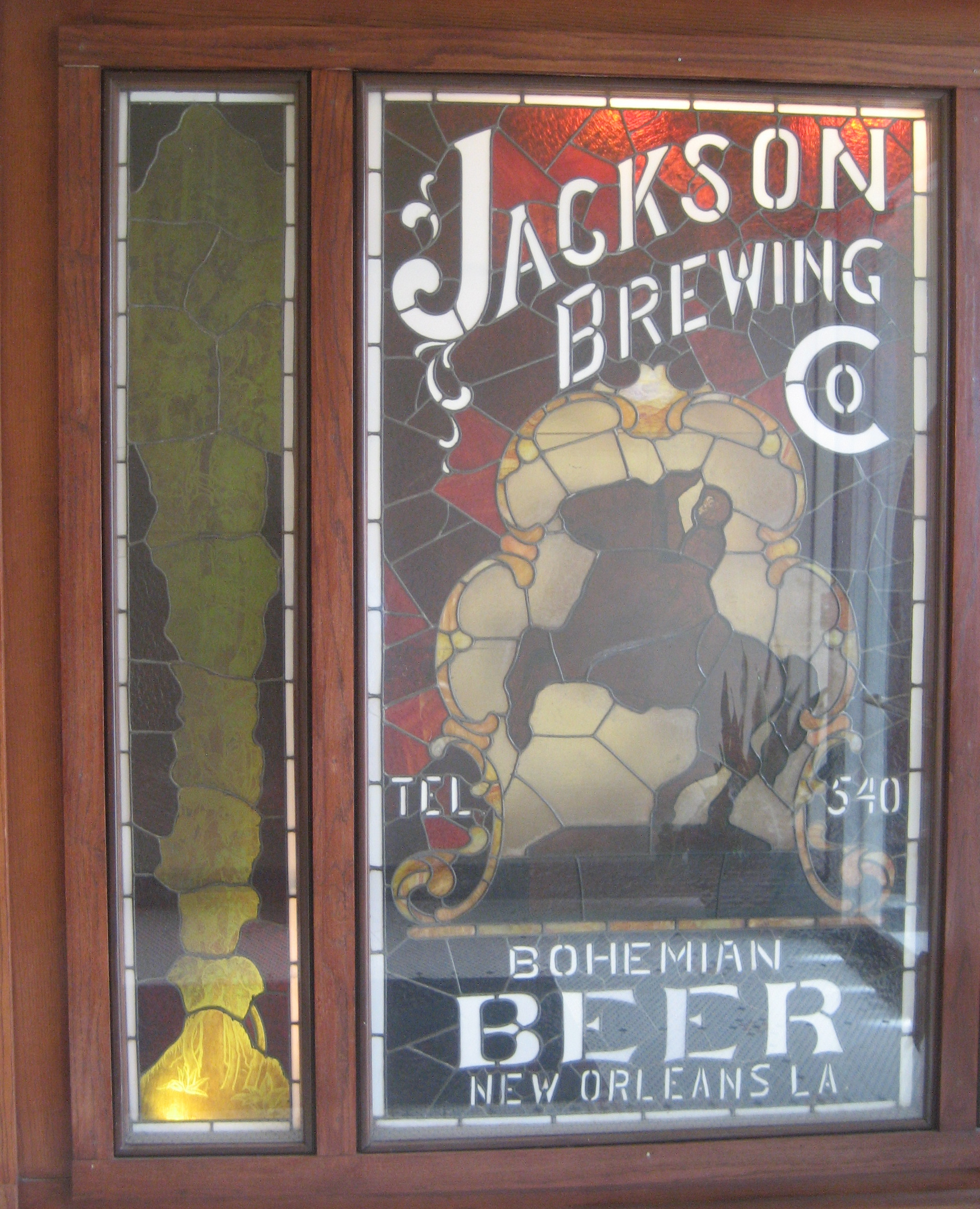
Stained glass panel from the Jackson Brewing Company, New Orleans

Jackson Brewing Company, or Jackson Brewery, was a regional brewery operating in New Orleans, from 1890 to 1974. It sold Jax beer (a brand name also used in different states brewed by Jacksonville, Florida's Jax Brewing Company, which it had no connection to before 1954). It was popularly known as the Jax Brewery. At its height, it was the largest brewery in the Southern United States.

Its French Quarter building is now a historic landmark in New Orleans and houses restaurants, apartments, entertainment venues, and since 2023 the studios of radio station WWOZ.

== History ==
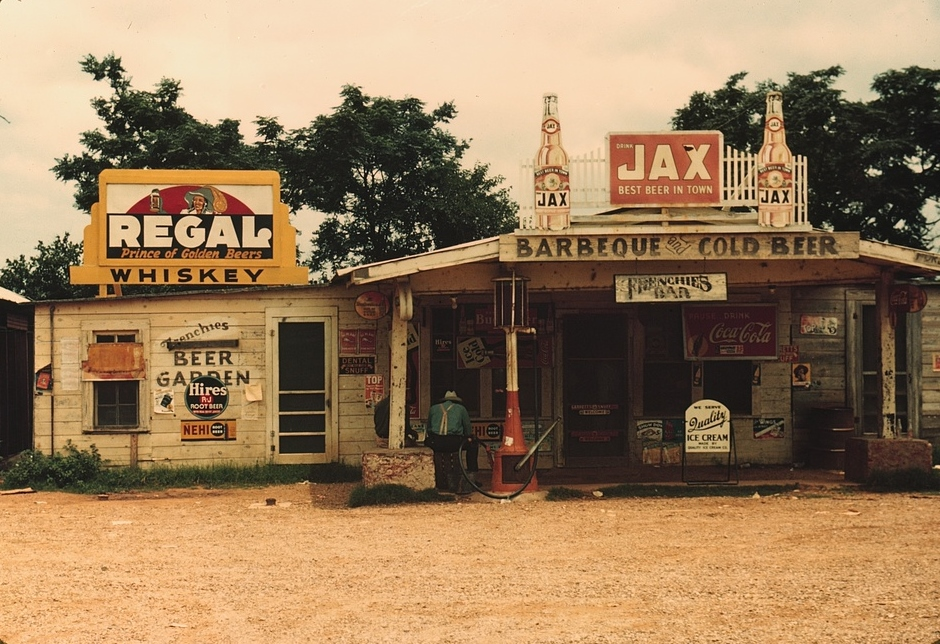
1940 photo of Jax signs in Melrose, Louisiana by Marion Post Wolcott

The brewery was founded by Lawrence Fabacher in 1890 as Jackson Bohemian Brewery; its name was later changed to Jax Beer and finally Jackson Brewing Company, after Andrew Jackson and Jackson Square. It soon grew to be a prominent regional brewery and it, along with Dixie, were the only New Orleans breweries to survive Prohibition.

In 1935, Jackson Brewing Company entered a legal dispute with Jacksonville Brewing Company over the "Jax Beer" trademark, used by both companies. This resulted in a compromise in which Jacksonville Brewing Company got exclusive rights to sell in Florida, Georgia, South Carolina, and North Carolina, while Jackson Brewing got states to the west. Jackson Brewing expanded in the 1940s, as demand increased. In the 1950s, the company suffered competition from the growing national breweries. In 1954, it bought exclusive rights to the Jax trademark from the Jacksonville company, which ended brewing operations. This move made Jackson Brewing the 10th largest brewery in the U.S. and the largest in the South.

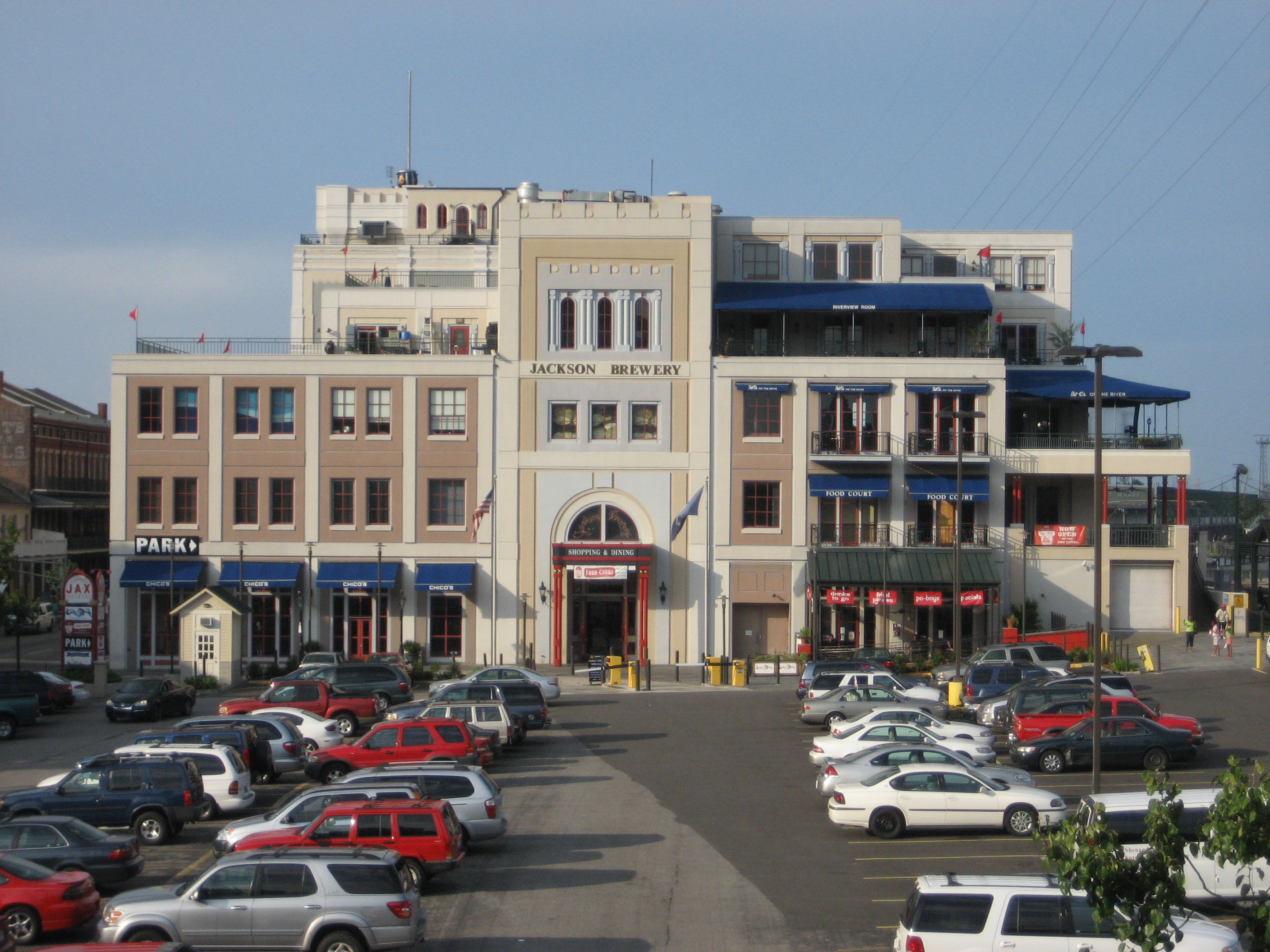
Jackson Brewery shops (upriver side), 2007

In 1974, Jackson Brewing entered financial straits and was acquired by Pearl Brewing Company. Pearl continued producing Jax Beer until 1984, when it was acquired by Pabst Brewing Company and took on Pabst branding.

The brewery building remains a landmark in New Orleans. After brewing operations ceased, the building was purchased and turned into space for residences, shops, and restaurants.

== In popular culture ==
In Tennessee Williams' 1947 play A Streetcar Named Desire, character Steve Hubbell requests Jax Beer from his cohorts for the evening’s poker game in Act 1, Scene 1.

In the 1975 movie Hard Times, Charles Bronson can be seen drinking a JAX beer in a Depression-era New Orleans bar.

== See also ==
- List of breweries in Louisiana
- Jackson Brewing Company (San Francisco)
- List of defunct breweries in the United States
