= Baby Huey (singer) =

American singer

- James Ramey pictured on the cover of his posthumous album, The Baby Huey Story: The Living Legend

Background information
- Born: James Thomas Ramey; August 17, 1944; Richmond, Indiana, U.S.
- Origin: Chicago, Illinois, U.S.
- Died: October 28, 1970 (aged 26) Chicago, Illinois, U.S.
- Genres: Chicago soul; psychedelic soul; R&B
- Occupations: Singer
- Years active: 1963–1970
- Label: Curtom
- Formerly of: The Vets, Baby Huey & the Babysitters, Melvyn "Deacon" Jones, Johnny Ross

James Thomas Ramey (August 17, 1944 – October 28, 1970), known professionally as Baby Huey, was an American soul singer. He was the frontman of the band Baby Huey & the Babysitters, whose sole LP for Curtom Records in 1971 later became influential in the development of hip-hop.

== Life and career ==
A native of Richmond, Indiana, James was the son of Robert and Ernestine Ramey. He moved to Chicago, Illinois, at the age of nineteen, and worked with several local bands as a singer. When he was still in high school, he worked with his first; the Vets. Due to a glandular disorder, Ramey weighed about 350 pounds (160 kg) around this time. His size contributed to his stage presence, but also to health problems. Nevertheless, he made light of his condition, adopting the stage name "Baby Huey" after Paramount Pictures' giant duckling cartoon character of the same name. In 1963, Ramey, organist/trumpeter Melvyn "Deacon" Jones, and guitarist Johnny Ross founded a band called Baby Huey & the Babysitters, which became a popular local act and released several 45 RPM singles. The four songs, "Beg Me", "Monkey Man", "Messin' with the Kid" and "Just Being Careful" were spread over various single releases.

During the late 1960s, the band followed the lead of Sly & the Family Stone and became a psychedelic soul act. Huey began wearing an Afro and donned psychedelic African-inspired robes, and adding sing-song, self-referential rhymes to his live performances. According to his bandmates, Ramey's rhymes were very similar in style to those later popularized by rappers in hip-hop music. The Babysitters were a popular live act, but never took the time out to record an album. They toured widely in the US, and were seen by a member of the Rothschild family, who flew the band to Paris, France, to play at a family ball. The band's appearances in clubs there led in turn to a feature in Vogue magazine.

In early 1969, the band's agent Marv Heiman secured them an audition with Curtom Records arranger Donny Hathaway. Heiman states that Hathaway came by the Thumbs Up club and was very impressed by the act, and got Curtom Records head Curtis Mayfield to come the following night. Mayfield wanted to sign Baby Huey, but not the band. Although the band participated in the recording of Ramey's debut album, there were feelings of unease among them, and Jones quit the band during the recording. It is also likely that Ross had quit some time before.

By 1970, Ramey had developed an addiction to heroin, and his weight had increased to over 400 pounds (180 kg). He began regularly missing gigs or turning up late, and, at the insistence of his bandmates, briefly entered rehabilitation in the spring of 1970. In addition to the heroin problem, Ramey was also drinking. Melvyn Jones described in his book that once while pouring his breakfast cereal, Ramey's drug kit fell out of the box.

== Death ==
On October 28, 1970, Ramey died of a drug-related heart attack at the age of twenty-six in a Chicago motel room. His funeral was held on November 1 in his native Richmond, Indiana, and he was buried there in Glen Havens Memorial Gardens.

== Legacy ==
Baby Huey's album, The Baby Huey Story: The Living Legend, was released posthumously. Produced by Curtis Mayfield, the album features several Mayfield compositions, as well as a cover of Sam Cooke's "A Change Is Gonna Come" and two original compositions by Ramey. The album did not sell well upon its initial release and was largely forgotten by the mainstream. Today, the album is considered a classic of its period.

On October 7, 1971, Jet magazine ran a small piece claiming his mother was granted authorization to audit the records of two recording firms, including Curtom Records. The order also permitted her to evaluate an undetermined estate left by him. According to Chicago attorney Vernon M. Rhinehart, Ramey had a salary of $3,500 per week.

Several songs from The Baby Huey Story, including "Hard Times", "Listen to Me", and "Mighty Mighty Children", have been frequently sampled by hip-hop producers since the 1980s. "Hard Times" alone has been sampled by dozens of artists, including Chill Rob G ("Ride The Rhythm", Ride the Rhythm (1989)), Ice Cube ("The Birth", Death Certificate), A Tribe Called Quest ("Can I Kick It? (Spirit Mix)", People's Instinctive Travels and the Paths of Rhythm), Ghostface Killah ("Buck 50", Supreme Clientele), Biz Markie ("The Dragon", The Biz Never Sleeps), and others. John Legend and the Roots covered "Hard Times" for their 2010 album Wake Up!. Many people, including the Babysitters themselves, see The Baby Huey Story as a significant and important influence on hip-hop music.

"Listen to Me" was featured as a rap backing track in two episodes of the 2016 Netflix series The Get Down. The 2020 Netflix true crime documentary Fear City: New York vs the Mafia, the 2011 film The Lincoln Lawyer, the 2019 Norwegian HBO Max series Beforeigners and the 2023 miniseries The Continental: From the World of John Wick also use "Hard Times" as the opening theme. Both "Listen to Me" and "Hard Times" are featured on the soundtrack of the film I Believe in Miracles.

== Discography ==
=== Albums ===
- The Baby Huey Story: The Living Legend (1971)

=== Singles ===
- "Mighty Mighty Children" (Curtom CR 1969)
- "Listen to Me" (Curtom CR 1962)

=== Compilations ===
- "Hard Times" on Shaolin Soul
- "Listen to Me" on Kurtis Blow Presents the History of Rap, Vol. 1: The Genesis (1997, Rhino Records).
