= Funky Buddha Brewery =

Brewery in Oakland Park, Florida

Funky Buddha
- Type: Craft brewery
- Location: 1201 NE 38th St., Oakland Park, Florida 33334
- Opened: 2010
- Key people: Ryan Sentz, Giana Sentz, KC Sentz
- Annual production volume: 27,000 US beer barrels (32,000 hL) (Note: d'Oliveira 2017 gives annual production as 45,000 US beer barrels (53,000 hL).)
- Employees: 130 (Note: d'Oliveira 2017 wrote the brewery employs 140.)
- Website: funkybuddhabrewery.com

Active beers
Name	Type
Floridian	Hefeweizen
Hopgun IPA	India pale ale

Seasonal beers
Name	Type
Last Snow	Porter
Maple Bacon Coffee Porter	Porter
More Moro Blood Orange IPA	India Pale Ale
Nib Smuggler	Porter
Sweet Potato Casserole	Strong ale

Funky Buddha Brewery is a large brewery headquartered in Oakland Park, Florida.

== The early years ==
It started when a Florida couple bought small brewhouse, hookah lounge and live music venue in Boca Raton, Florida in 2006. On February 5, 2010, founders Ryan and Giana Sentz moved to another location and began brewing their own beers in September. The new location, also in Boca Raton, was named Funky Buddha Lounge and Brewery. In 2012, Funky Buddha announced it would begin using the Cigar City Brewing system to brew and bottle their beer and begin distribution. In the same year they opened a homebrew supply store at the lounge and brewery. The Boca Raton location has a 55 US gallon (210 L) brewhouse. It was the second production brewery to open in Broward and Palm Beach counties, following Due South Brewing. Funky Buddha's success "helped pave the way for what is now a thriving local brew scene".

== Growth ==
In 2013, with the help of his brother KC Sentz, Ryan Sentz opened a second location and production facility in Oakland Park. The Oakland Park location is a 40,000 square foot (3,700 m^{2}) building with a 3,000 square foot (280 m^{2}) taproom with 30 draft lines. (Note: d'Oliveira 2017 states the Oakland Park facility is 54,000 square feet (5,000 m^{2}). As of December 2017 the Funky Buddha Brewery website gives a figure of 110,000 square feet (10,000 m^{2}).) Each year since 2013 the brewery has released a limited edition brew, Undefeated Saison. It is released once every National Football League team has lost a game in the current season to commemorate that the Miami Dolpins undefeated season of 1972 remains unmatched.

In 2014, Funky Buddha's Floridian was available at 400 restaurants in South Florida. At that time Floridian accounted for half of the beer the brewery made and sold. Celebrity Cruises announced a four-day Funky Buddha Craft Beer Cruise in 2014 scheduled for March 2015. In 2015 the brewery sold 19,500 US beer barrels (22,900 hL) making it a "regional" facility as designated by the Brewers Association. Also that year Funky Buddha's distribution expanded to include North Florida.

== Sale ==
As of 2017 Funky Buddha was the largest brewer and most popular tap room in Florida based on dollar sales. The brewery is known for its Maple Bacon Coffee Porter and Hopgun IPA beers. On August 10, 2017, it was announced that Constellation Brands had bought Funky Buddha for an undisclosed price. Ryan and KC Sentz will continue to run day-to-day operations. After celebrating its 7th anniversary, the original Boca Raton Funky Buddha Lounge was sold to Allen Steen in 2017 and rebranded Robot Brewing Co. Reported in Constellation Brands’ 2018 annual report, Funky Buddha and Schrader Cellars wines are noted in a combined acquisition cost for $149 million. Wine Spectator later learned the purchase acquisition cost for the Schrader Cellars wine portion was approximately $60 million leaving approximately $80-$90 million attributable to the Funky Buddha acquisition.

In 2023, Funky Buddha was reacquired by Ryan and KC Sentz from Constellation for an undisclosed price and the brewery celebrated its 10-year anniversary.

== Awards ==
- Maple Bacon Coffee Porter won the gold medal in the specialty beer category at the 2016 World Beer Cup.
- No Crusts, a brown ale flavored like a peanut butter and jelly sandwich, was awarded a silver medal at the 2017 Great American Beer Festival
- Funky Buddha was chosen "Best Brewery" by the Sun-Sentinel for 2017, also winning the reader's choice award.
