= Baby Huey & the Babysitters =

American band

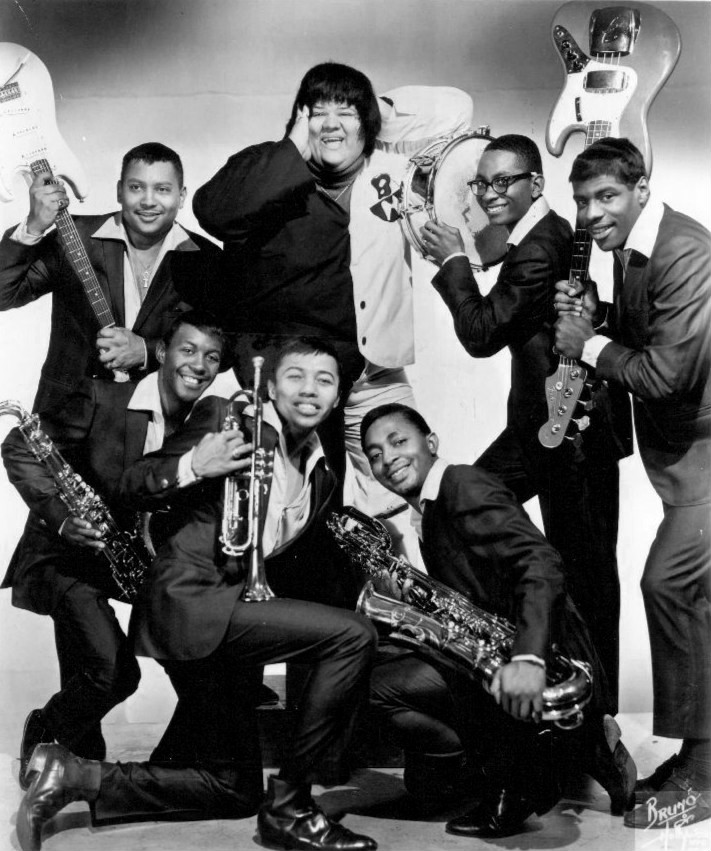

Background information
- Origin: Gary, Indiana, U.S.
- Genres: Psychedelic funk
- Labels: Shann; USA
- Past members: Baby Huey; Johnny Ross; Melvyn "Deacon" Jones; Dennis Moore; Larry Sales

Baby Huey & the Babysitters was an American band formed in Gary, Indiana. The band, founded in 1963, was the idea of organist / trumpeter Melvyn Jones and guitarist Johnny Ross. James Ramey was their front man, and he adopted the stage name of "Baby Huey" (after the cartoon/comic book character Baby Huey). They were well known in Chicago's club scene.

== Background and formation ==
The group came into being as a result of Johnny Ross; Melvyn Jones (later to be known as Melvyn "Deacon" Jones); and James Ramey getting together. In the beginning they would practice in the sound-proof room at the home of Melvyn Jones. The room was built for Melvyn and his drummer brother, Harold Jones, to practice in.

== Early recording career (1960s) ==
During their early career they recorded four songs released on singles between 1964 and 1966: "Monkey Man," "Messin' with the Kid," "Just Being Careful," and "Beg Me." They went to Paris, France to play at the coming out party for the daughter of the Baron de Rothschild. In 1966 they were added to the client roster of Capitol Booking.

Billboard, in its May 17, 1969 issue, reported that the band was due to appear on the Merv Griffin Show (May 21).

== The 1970s ==
By 1970, most of the original Babysitter members had left and had been replaced by new personnel. Melvyn Jones was one of the last original founding members to leave.

Ramey died on October 28, 1970. He was in the midst of recording the band's debut album for the Curtom label. The album that was released posthumously only featured some songs by the Babysitters. The rest were with Curtom session musicians.

The Babysitters re-formed, briefly, to play at Ramey's funeral. Manager Marv Stuart would later take some former members, including Dave Cook, to form Goliath with Chaka Khan.

== Post Baby Huey & the Babysitters ==
Melvyn Jones joined The Impressions touring band, and became A&R man for Curtom Records. He also worked with Freddie King and John Lee Hooker. He later came to be known as Melvyn "Deacon" Jones. He died at the age of 73 in Hollywood, California.

Johnny Ross recorded some singles, and had his own cable television show.

Dennis Moore, the original drummer, killed himself after coming back from Vietnam, having lost his ability to play drums. Because he had dropped out of school to go to Paris with the band, he had lost his draft exempt status, and had been drafted.

Johnny Ross died in 2006 from a heart condition related to an appendicitis attack.

== Past members ==
=== Original line up: early to mid 1960s ===
- James Ramey (Baby Huey) : lead vocals
- Melvyn Jones: organ and trumpet
- Johnny Ross: lead guitar
- Larry Sales: bass guitar
- Dennis Moore: drums

Added later

- Byron Watkins: saxophone
- Charles Clark: saxophone

=== Late 1960s members ===
- James Ramey (Baby Huey) : lead vocals
- Melvyn Jones: keyboards
- Rick Marcotte: trumpet
- Alton Littles: trumpet
- Byron Watkins: tenor sax
- Othello Anderson: flute
- Danny O'Neil: guitar
- Dan Alfano: bass
- Rene Smith: percussion
- Plato Jones: bongos
- Dave Cook: organ

Additional personnel

- Jack Renee: unknown instrument
- Philip Henry: unknown instrument
- "Moose" (nickname): drums

== Discography (partial) ==
- "Just Being Careful" / "Messin' with the Kid" (Shann 73924, 1965)
- "Just Being Careful" / "Messin' with the Kid" (U.S.A. 801, 1965)
- "Monkey Man" / "Beg Me" (St. Lawrence 1002, 1965; issued on both blue and white label)
- "Monkey Man" / "Messin' with the Kid" (St. Lawrence 1002, 1965; white label only)
- "Monkey Man" / "Messin' with the Kid" (Satellite 2013, 1966)
- "Mighty Mighty Children, Pt. I" / "Mighty Mighty Children, Pt. II" (Curtom CR-1939, 1969)
- "Listen to Me' / "Hard Times" (Curtom CR-1962, 1971)
