= Hard Times (Canadian TV series) =

Canadian documentary television series

- Genre: Documentary
- Directed by: David Rabinovitch
- Presented by: Ed Reid
- Country of origin: Canada
- Original language: English
- No. of seasons: 1

Production
- Producer: David Rabinovitch

Original release
- Network: CBC Television
- Release: 4 August – 2 September 1975

Hard Times is a Canadian documentary television program that aired on CBC Television in 1975.

== Premise ==
Ed Reid hosted this series of documentaries concerned Canadian life in the 1930s, particularly the history of the Great Depression. Newsreels and historic photographs were combined with interviews of people recounting their Depression-era experiences.

Hard Times was a prime-time repackaging of segments which previously aired in 1974 and 1975 on the daytime Take 30 series. Reid was a Take 30 co-host at that time.

== Scheduling ==
This series aired on Mondays at 10:30 p.m. from 4 August to 2 September 1975.
