= Florida Beer Company =

Brewery in Cape Canaveral, Florida

Coordinates: 28°23′56″N 80°36′43″W

- Industry: Alcoholic beverage
- Founded: 1996
- Headquarters: Cape Canaveral, Florida
- Products: Beer
- Production output: 35,680 US barrels (2013)
- Owner: Indian River Beverage Corporation

Florida Beer Company is a brewery in Cape Canaveral, Florida.

== History ==
Florida Beer Company is organized in the state of Florida as a C Corporation. Founded in 1996 as Indian River Brewing Company, the 11,000 square foot brewery on South US 1 in Melbourne produced its first beers, Indian River Shoal Draft and Indian River Amberjack in June 1997; production of Kelly's Irish Hard Cider and a variety of private label beers began in late 1997–1998. This company was capitalized by a private placement to approximately 65 mostly local shareholders, an SBA-guaranteed loan and original founder contributions.

The company was recapitalized and reorganized in August 2003 with the addition of the current ownership group as Indian River Beverage Corporation. Indian River Beverage Corporation does business as Florida Beer Company. Florida Beer Company is engaged in the manufacturing, packaging, marketing and sale of alcoholic beverages specifically malt based products (beer). The Company participates in the premium craft beer market.

In March 2005 the company entered into an Asset Purchase Agreement with Ybor City Brewing Company to acquire the brands, marks, intellectual property, inventory and all business assets of Ybor City Brewing Company and the related entities. The assets and brands included Key West (Key West Brewery, originally of Key West, Florida), Ybor Gold (Ybor City Brewing Company originally of Tampa, Florida) and Hurricane Reef (Hurricane Reef Brewery originally of Miami, Florida).

Florida Beer Company is the largest craft brewer in the State of Florida. The State of Florida is the third largest beer market in the country. While Florida ranks among the top for beer consumption in the United States historically the craft segment has lagged versus other parts of the country. In recent years this has changed. The craft market is now out pacing all other segments of the beer industry and the craft market has grown at 22% in Florida versus 11.4% in the rest of country.

During 2008, the Company sold 19 different beers (malt beverages) and two ciders entirely manufactured and packaged at its company-owned brewery in Melbourne, Florida. The company also engages in contract brewing for a small number of customers. One of these is Original Sin Premium Hard Cider of New York City, the other is Kelly's Irish Cider, winner of three gold medals from the North American Brewers Association.

The Company sells its products through a network of wholesale distributors who then sell to bars, restaurants, grocery stores, package stores and other specialty beverage retailers. The Company sells its products predominantly in the state of Florida (80%+), but also markets in New York, Illinois, Georgia, Alabama, Nebraska, Wisconsin, South Carolina and the Caribbean. Florida, which represents the bulk of the Company sales, is a three-tier state governed by a beer franchise law. Florida Statutes Title XXXIV Chapter 563. In many states, specifically Florida, laws affect enforcement of certain terms of the distributor agreements.

In 2014 the company opened a new facility in Cape Canaveral, Florida in Brevard County. The production brewery is located at 200 Imperial Blvd. This building is 60,000 square feet (5,600 m^{2}) and houses all production related activity and equipment, a visitor center and tap room with retail store.

The company also produces beer for Universal Studios Theme Parks in California and Florida. These beers include a real-world version of The Simpsons Duff Beer and Duff Light and Duff Dry sold at Springfield area and several beers for The Wizarding World of Harry Potter, including Hog's Head Brew, Wizard's Brew, and Dragon Scale.
