= Dunedin Brewery =

Dunedin Brewery is located in Dunedin, Florida, United States, was established in 1995 and is the oldest distributing microbrewery in Florida. Dunedin Brewery is family owned and operated by founders Michael N. Bryant and Kandi Bryant. The brewery produces many varieties of beer, ale and lager—along with numerous seasonal varieties. In 2018, Dunedin Brewery won a silver medal for their beer Ritual Madness in the "Fruited Wood- and Barrel-Aged Sour" category of the World Beer Cup.

In 2017, a second location was built just outside of Downtown Dunedin called the Antibrewery.

== Bibliography ==
- Burnside, Margaret Word (May–June 2000). Ask Margaret. p. 179.
