= Cigar City Brewing =

Craft brewery in Tampa, Florida

Cigar City Brewing, LLC is a craft brewery in Tampa, Florida, at 3924 West Spruce Street. Founded in 2007 by Joey Redner, it has been producing beer in Tampa since January 30, 2009. It currently produces approximately 170,000 barrels of beer annually. Since 2009, it has brewed over 6,000 individual brands of beer.

== History ==
Tampa native Joey Redner founded Cigar City Brewing in 2007 after holding a sales position with Dunedin Brewery (Florida's oldest microbrewery) and a beer writer position with the Tampa Bay Times. He hired Wayne Wambles as his brewmaster in 2008 and the pair brewed the first batch of Cigar City Beer, a batch of Maduro Brown Ale, on January 30, 2009. Additional brands followed, including Jai Alai IPA and Florida Cracker Belgian-style White Ale. Cigar City's Spruce Street brewery has expanded to include a 15 bbl and 30 bbl brewhouse, a packaging hall and a tasting room. The company has grown to produce 170,000 barrels of beer annually with distribution in 39 States.

Since 2010, Cigar City has released Hunahpu's Imperial Stout every March. From 2010 to 2019 the annual release was accompanied by a large beer festival (Hunahpu's Day) to celebrate the release. Each year over 5,000 beer fans attended and brewers from all over the world poured their beer at the festival.

As of March 2016, Cigar City has partnered with Longmont, Colorado based Oskar Blues Brewery to form CANarchy Craft Brewery Collective which includes Oskar Blues, Cigar City, Perrin Brewing and the Utah Brewers Cooperative outfit that includes the Wasatch and Squatters brands. As of January 2022, CANarchy Craft Brewery Collective has been sold to Monster Beverage Corporation.

== Beers ==
=== Year-round availability ===
- Jai Alai: India Pale Ale, 7.5% ABV. Named after the fast-paced sport, currently accounts for over 55% of Cigar City's annual production.
- Maduro: English-style Brown Ale, 5.5% ABV. References a maduro wrapper on a cigar.
- Florida Cracker: Belgian-style White Ale, 5.5% ABV. Named in honor of the cracker cowboys of Florida.
- Guayabera: Citra Pale Ale, 5.5% ABV. Named after the Cuban style shirts of the same name.
- Margarita Gose: German-style sour ale, 4.2% ABV. Made with orange lime and salt and named for the Cocktail
- Florida Man: 9.0% ABV. Double IPA. Named for the frequent jokes about news headlines that start with “Florida Man” before detailing some insane or stupid thing someone from the state has done often involving Alligators as shown on the can.
- Fancy Papers: Hazy IPA, 6.5% ABV

=== Seasonal releases ===
- Invasion: American pale ale, 5% ABV. Brewed originally for the Gasparilla Pirate Invasion.
- Oatmeal Raisin Cookie: Brown ale, 5.5% ABV. Brewed with cinnamon, raisins, and lactose.
- Wedge Cut: American wheat ale, 4.5% ABV. Brewed with lemon peel.
- White Oak Jai Alai: India pale ale, 7.5% ABV. An oak barrel aged variation of their Jai Alai.
- Paloma Gose: German-style sour ale, 4.2%. Brewed with grapefruit, lime and salt. Named for the Mexican cocktail.
- Spanish Cedar Jai Alai: India pale ale, 7.5% ABV. A Spanish cedar-rested variation of their Jai Alai. Formerly known as Humidor Series IPA.
- The Benwood: Hazy double IPA, 8% ABV. Named for Florida's most famous shipwreck.
- After-Sesh Ale: Session ale, 4.5% ABV. Brewed with orange, lime and salt.
- Cubano Espresso: Brown Ale, 5.5% ABV. Brewed with espresso beans, cacao and lactose
- Good Gourd: Imperial Pumpkin Ale, 8% ABV: A barrel-aged version was ranked as the Best Pumpkin Beer of 2016 by Paste Magazine
- Caffe Americano: Double stout, 12% ABV. Brewed with coffee and vanilla.
- Big Sound: Scotch ale, 8.5% ABV.
- Marshal Zhukov's: Russian imperial stout, 11.8% ABV. The base beer for Hunahpu's, named after Soviet general Georgy Zhukov.

=== Special releases ===
- Wet Candidate: Pre-Prohibition pilsner, 4.4% ABV.
- Ikebana Rice Lager: Japanese-style rice lager, 4.3% ABV. Named for the Japanese art of flower arranging.
- You Should Smile More: Double dry-hopped double IPA, 7.8% ABV.
- Hunahpu's Imperial Stout: Imperial stout, 11.8% ABV. Named in honor of a hero in Mayan mythology, the stout is brewed with ancho and pasilla chile peppers, vanilla, cacao and cinnamon.
- Alom's Imperial Stout: Imperial stout, 11.6% ABV. Named for the Mayan god of the sky and wood, it is brewed with Spanish cedar, cinnamon, vanilla, cacao nibs and chile peppers.
- Xmucane's Imperial Stout: Imperial stout, 11.6% ABV. Named for the grandmother of Hunahpu, it is brewed with hazelnuts, coffee, cinnamon, vanilla, cacao nibs and chile peppers.
- Sun Over The Yardarm: Gin barrel-aged ale, 6.9% ABV. Brewed with lemon, lime and orange peel.
- Oktoberfest: Märzen style lager, 5.8% ABV. A Bavarian-style lager
- Furry Friends: Double dry-hopped IPA, 6.8% ABV.
- Kulich: Brandy barrel-aged imperial stout, 12.3& ABV. Brewed with raisins, orange peel, pineapple, nutmeg, cardamom and cinnamon. Inspired by the traditional Russian Easter bread.
- Space Pope: India pale ale
- Tony Jannus: Cedar-aged pale ale, 5% ABV. Named for the famous aviator. Only available at CCB's Airport Brewpub in Tampa International Airport and Cigar City's tasting room.
- Minaret: English-style pub ale, 6% ABV. Named in honor of Henry B. Plant and the Tampa Bay Hotel.
- Lager: Tampa-style Lager, 4.5% ABV. A German-style leichtbier.
- Frostproof: Tropical shandy, 4% ABV. Brewed with guava and tangerine.

== Honors ==
- #9 Top Ranked Beer, Double Barrel-aged Hunahpu's, beeradvocate.com
- #3 Brewer in the World, 2010, ratebeer.com

== See also ==
- Barrel-aged beer
