= Jax Brewing Company =

Brewing Company

- Industry: Alcoholic beverage
- Founded: 1913
- Headquarters: Jacksonville, Florida, U.S.
- Products: Beer

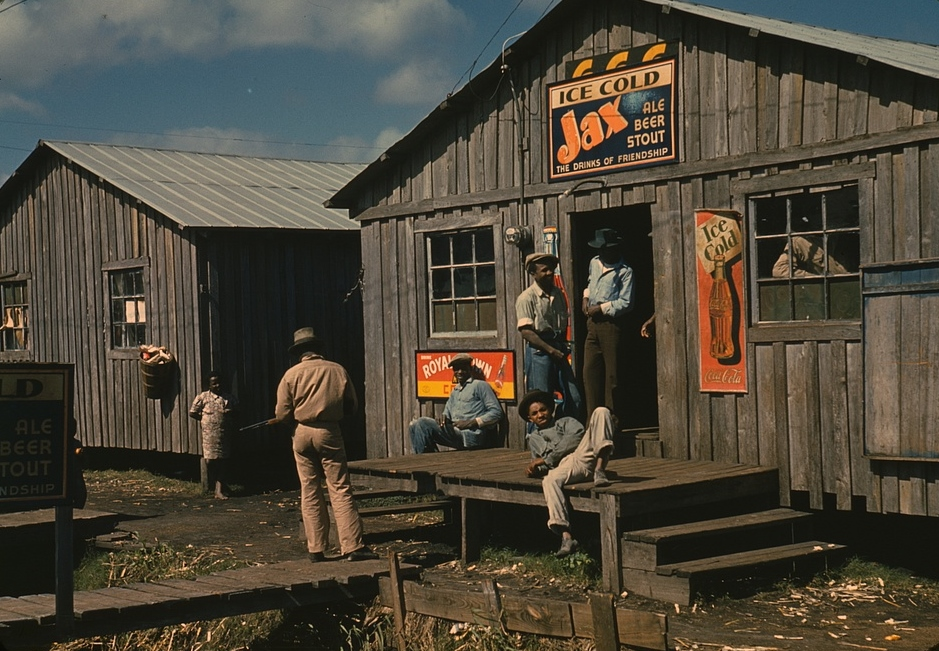
Juke joint for migratory workers in Belle Glade, Florida, 1941. Photo by Marion Post Wolcott.

Jax Brewing Company, originally Jacksonville Brewing Company, was a regional brewery in Jacksonville, Florida operating from 1913 to 1956. It was the second brewery to open in the state, after Florida Brewing Company in Tampa in 1896.

== History ==
Jacksonville Brewing Company was established by William Ostner, a German immigrant to the United States who worked in the St. Louis, Missouri, brewing industry. After visiting Jacksonville, Florida, in 1909, he determined the city would be a good location for a new brewery. He founded the enterprise with assistance from his in-laws, the Schorr family of the Schorr-Kolkschneider Brewing Company, and his good friend Jacob Bongner. The partners broke ground on the brewery building on West 16th Street on June 9, 1913. Jacksonville Brewing Company was a regional brewery distributing through Florida and the Southeastern U.S. It distributed its first beers in May 1914. Its flagship product, Jax Beer, was a German-style pilsner.

By 1917, the company had paid off its debts and was turning a profit. However, on May 14, 1918, Jacksonville voted to adopt prohibition, followed by nationwide prohibition in 1920. This made Jacksonville Brewing Company the last brewery to open in the U.S. before prohibition. The brewery pivoted to other products and services. The main operation became the Jax Ice and Cold Storage Company, which also produced ice cream, root beer, ginger ale, and near beer. The near beer operation featured an unusual brewing process in which beer was made normally and then boiled to remove alcohol, meaning that illegally strong beer existed at the plant for clandestine visits by locals. A significant percentage of the legal near beer was sold to speakeasys, which spiked it.

In 1933, in expectation of prohibition's repeal through the Twenty-first Amendment, Ostner, then the company's president following Bongner's death in 1924, prepared to resume brewing. He ordered equipment and began brewing months early, making Jacksonville Brewing Company the first brewery in Florida to be ready for business. They distributed their first beers just a week after the Amendment passed on December 5. In 1935, the company entered into a legal dispute over the Jax Beer trademark with the Jackson Brewing Company in New Orleans; this was resolved with a compromise giving Jacksonville Brewing exclusive rights to sell Jax Beer in Florida, Georgia, South Carolina, and North Carolina. In 1940, Ostner officially changed the company's name to Jax Brewing Company. In 1941, Jax Brewing Company greatly expanded its production by bottling Old Union Beer for New Orleans–based Union Brewing, increasing sales by around 50%.

The brewery also credited with being the first to sell beer in a six-pack in 1945 or 1946, as a result of market pressure from breweries using disposable cans. Breweries were modernizing after World War II, and the advent of canned beer created a huge cost advantage for breweries that could afford the canning equipment. In an effort to compete, the Ostners bought 100,000 durable sacks, branded them with "Jax Beer," and sold six beers to a sack.

Ultimately the pressure to modernize brought the two competing breweries together. In 1956, the Jacksonville Brewing Company sold to the Jackson Brewing Company of New Orleans and the Jax brewery in Jacksonville closed its doors. As of 2014, the old Jacksonville brewery building still stands in the Durkeeville neighborhood at 1429 W. 16th St. Jax was solely brewed by the Jackson Brewing Company from 1956 through 1974, until pressure from national breweries made it difficult for regional breweries to compete.
