= Florida Brewery =

Florida Brewery Inc. is a beer and malt beverage brewer established in 1973 in Auburndale, Florida. Florida Brewery produces non-alcoholic Malta style beverages for Venezuela's Malta Polar, Goya, Great Value, Hatuey, Mr. Special, Publix, Regal and SuperMax brands. Beer offerings have included Master's Choice, Bay Side, Gator Lager, Fischer's, and Dunk's labels. In 1985 Florida Brewery introduced Alligator Beer, developed by two University of Florida seniors. The company has also copackaged Pabst. As of 1988 the company employed 25 people.

Florida Brewery was built by L. N. Duncan and originally known as Duncan Brewing Co. The company has had several ownership changes since.

== History ==
Florida Brewery was sold to G. Heileman Brewing Co. of La Crosse, Wisconsin in 1980. Ron Fontaine bought the company in 1986.

In 1989 the company worked to comply with Auburndale sewer treatment cleanup requirements.
