= Jackson Brewing Company (San Francisco) =

Former brewery in San Francisco, California

- U.S. National Register of Historic Places
- San Francisco Designated Landmark
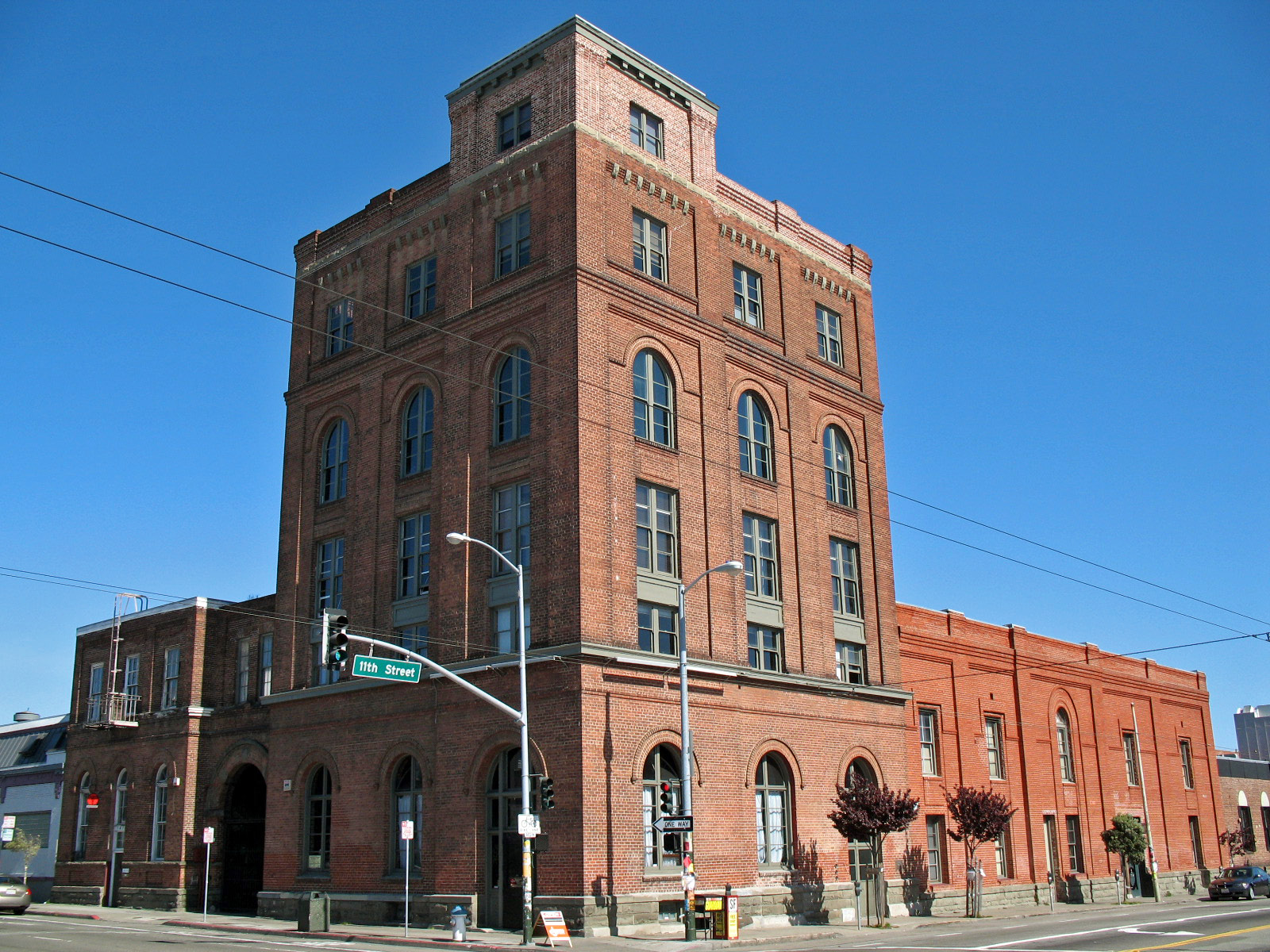
- The complex in 2008

- Location within San Francisco County Location within California Location within the United States
- Location: 1475–1489 Folsom Street and 319–351 11th Street, San Francisco, California
- Coordinates: 37.7719°N 122.4138°W
- Built: 1906–1907; 1912–1913
- Architect: James T. Ludlow (1912 expansion)
- Architectural style: Romanesque Revival
- NRHP reference No.: 93000284
- SFDL No.: 199

Significant dates
- Added to NRHP: April 8, 1993
- Designated SFDL: January 5, 1991

The Jackson Brewing Company, also known as the Jackson Brewery, is a former brewery complex at Folsom and 11th streets in the South of Market neighborhood of San Francisco, California. The company was founded in 1859 by Thomas E. Green and Jacob Lynn and later run by the Fredericks family. The buildings that stand today were put up in 1906–1907 and 1912–1913, after an earlier plant on the site, still under construction, was destroyed in the 1906 San Francisco earthquake.

The brewery closed in 1920 at the start of Prohibition. The complex was named San Francisco Landmark No. 199 in 1991 and listed on the National Register of Historic Places in 1993.

== History ==
Green and Lynn opened the Jackson Brewery in 1859 on First Street, between Howard and Folsom streets. The William A. Fredericks family took over the business in 1867 and ran it for the rest of its existence.

In 1905 the company bought land at Folsom and 11th streets and began building a new plant there. The unfinished buildings were destroyed by the 1906 earthquake and fire. The company rebuilt on the same site in 1906–1907 and enlarged the plant in 1912–1913. James T. Ludlow, an engineer, designed the 1912 expansion; Kaufman & Edwards were the contractors. The finished plant had a brewhouse, malt house, bottling works and cold-storage cellars. Brewing stopped in 1920 when Prohibition took effect.

== Architecture ==
The buildings are Romanesque Revival, of brick on concrete foundations, with wood and stone ornament. They form a group of low-rise structures, each built for a different stage of the brewing process, and together are one of the last brewery complexes of the period left in the city.

== Landmark designation ==
The city designated the Jackson Brewing Company San Francisco Landmark No. 199 on January 5, 1991. It was added to the National Register of Historic Places on April 8, 1993.

== See also ==
- List of San Francisco Designated Landmarks
- National Register of Historic Places listings in San Francisco
